= The Ark and the Darkness =

2024 American Christian documentary film

- Directed by: Ralph Strean
- Produced by: Ralph Strean; Daniel A. Biddle
- Production companies: Sevenfold Films; Genesis Apologetics
- Distributed by: Fathom Events
- Release date: March 20, 2024 (United States)
- Running time: 125 minutes
- Country: United States
- Language: English
- Box office: $2,097,560

The Ark and the Darkness is a Christian documentary film that was released in 2024. It is directed by Ralph Strean and produced by Strean and Daniel A. Biddle. The film was produced by Sevenfold Films in collaboration with Genesis Apologetics and presents a young-Earth creationist interpretation of the biblical account of the Genesis flood narrative and contemporary geology.

The film received a limited-event theatrical release in the United States through Fathom Events in March 2024 where it ranked third at the domestic box office on each of its first two days. Overall, the film was shown in 1,030 theaters nationwide and grossed $2,097,560 domestically.

== Synopsis ==
The documentary examines the biblical account of Noah's Ark and the global flood described in the Book of Genesis. Through the use of narration, computer-generated imagery, and interviews with scientists and scholars from several different disciplines, it presents arguments commonly associated with flood geology and young-Earth creationism.

The film addresses various topics concerning Noah's Ark, the Flood, and the biblical account of Genesis chapters 1 through 11, including the dimensions and capacity of Noah's Ark, the number of animals that would have been carried on the Ark, flood traditions found in different cultures, the fossil record, sedimentary rock formations, polystrate trees, the burial of plants and animals, languages, and how animal populations could have diversified after the flood.

The documentary discusses geological sites and formations and presents the occurrence of fossilized terrestrial and marine organisms within sedimentary deposits as evidence for large-scale flooding. It also discusses reports of preserved endogenous bioorganic material found in dinosaur fossils and challenges conventional interpretations of the age and formation of the fossil record.

The film features scientists and researchers associated with creationist ministries and Christian educational institutions, such as Liberty University and Answers in Genesis, including geologist Andrew Snelling, paleontologist Gabriela Haynes, historian of geology Terry Mortenson, geophysicist John Baumgardner, microbiologist Andrew Fabich, engineer Mark Horstemeyer, science educator Charles Jackson, and archaeologist Randall Price.

== Production ==
The Ark and the Darkness was directed by filmmaker Ralph Strean and produced by Strean and Daniel A. Biddle, president of Genesis Apologetics. It was produced by Sevenfold Films in collaboration with Genesis Apologetics. Strean previously directed the 2017 documentary Genesis: Paradise Lost.

The Ark and the Darkness uses a combination of interviews, dramatic visualizations, and computer animation to illustrate many of the events described in the flood narrative and bring the biblical story to life visually.

== Release and box office ==
The film was distributed theatrically in the United States by Fathom Events where it was shown at over 1,000 theaters nationwide. Initial screenings were held on Wednesday, March 20, and Thursday, March 21, of 2024.

On March 20, the film was shown in 996 theaters and earned $750,982, ranking third at the domestic daily box office. On March 21, showings expanded to 1,030 theaters and the film earned an additional $955,257, once again ranking third for the day at the box office. Its two-day cumulative gross was $1,706,239. Overall, the film ranked tenth on Box Office Mojo's domestic weekly chart for March 15–21, 2024.

Due to the interest generated during its limited release in March, additional screenings were subsequently held in a smaller number of theaters in April. The film was screened again on April 1 in 597 theaters across the nation and earned an additional $359,300. The film's widest release was 1,030 theaters on March 21, and the total reported domestic theatrical gross for The Ark and the Darkness was $2,097,560. The film was later made available through online video platforms where it has accumulated over 2,000,000 views.

== Reception ==
The Ark and the Darkness received mixed reviews from media coverage, with most coverage coming primarily from publications and websites discussing religion, Christianity, creationism, and the relationship between religion and science.

Movieguide reviewed the film favorably, praising its production, visual presentation, and Christian message. CBN News also presented the film favorably, with their coverage highlighting its box-office performance and arguments for the historicity of a global flood.

Leah MarieAnn Klett, writing for The Christian Post, described the film as an attempt to counter mainstream interpretations of the biblical flood as mythology, allegory, or a regional event, as well as mentioning how the film draws "parallels between the days of Noah and contemporary times". Her article focused especially on comments from an interview with Biddle concerning the film's scientific and theological purposes.

While some reviewers praised the film, other reviewers challenged the film's scientific and theological arguments. In a review for Righting America, Amanda Harpold characterized the film as "a documentary which serves as an apologetic for a global flood". Harpold also described the film as "a mix of a Discovery Channel documentary and Steven Spielberg’s Jurassic Park" in how it was produced. She criticized its treatment of scientific evidence and argued that its presentation depended upon first accepting a particular interpretation of the Bible.

Biologist Joel Duff, writing on the Naturalis Historia website, criticized the film's presentation of geology and paleontology and disputed its interpretation of the fossil and geological evidence. He argued that the film "is not a straightforward movie; rather, it’s a documentary that intertwines scientific evidence in support of a particular narrative of the Noahic account". He also argued that the film's discussion of end-times theology distracted from its treatment of the Ark and the flood.

== Awards ==
The Ark and the Darkness was shown at several film festivals nationwide and received awards at several Christian and faith-based film festivals in 2024.

- The film received an Outstanding Excellence Award at the 2024 Religion Faith International Film Festival's.
- The film won first place in the documentary category at the 2024 Freedom Christian Film Festival.
- The film received awards for Best Documentary Feature, Best Producer, and Best Sound Design at the 2024 Great Lakes Christian Film Festival.

== See also ==
- Creationism
- Creation science
- Flood geology
- Genesis flood narrative
- Noah's Ark
- Young Earth creationism
