= George McCready Price =

Canadian creationist

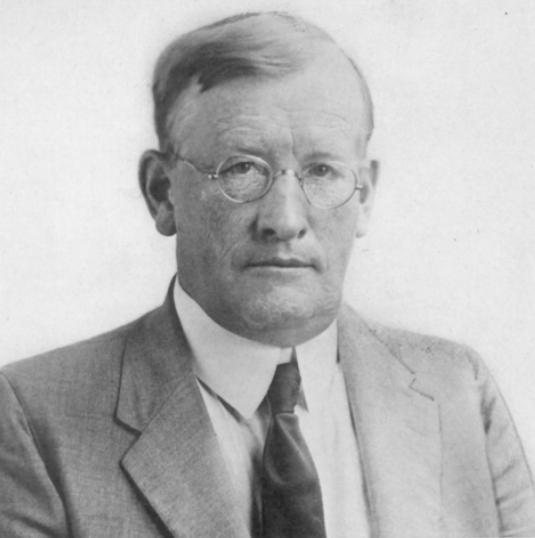
- Price in 1932
- Born: 26 August 1870; Havelock, New Brunswick, Canada
- Died: 24 January 1963 (aged 92); Loma Linda, California, US
- Occupation: Creationist author
- Known for: Flood geology

George McCready Price (26 August 1870 – 24 January 1963) was a Canadian creationist. He produced several anti-evolution and creationist works, particularly on the subject of flood geology. His views did not become common among creationists until after his death, particularly with the modern creation science movement starting in the 1960s.

== Personal life ==
Price was the great great grandfather of Lake Street Dive vocalist Rachael Price.

== Biography ==
Price was born in Havelock, New Brunswick, Canada. His father died in 1882, and his mother joined the Seventh-day Adventist Church. Price attended Battle Creek College (now Andrews University) between 1891 and 1893. In 1896, he enrolled in a one-year teacher training course at the Provincial Normal School of New Brunswick (now the University of New Brunswick), where he took some elementary courses in some of the natural sciences, including some mineralogy.

Price taught at a series of small-town schools from 1897 onwards, including at a high school in Tracadie between 1899 and 1902. While there, socially, he met Alfred Corbett Smith (head of the medical department at a local leprosarium) who loaned him scientific literature. Believing the Earth was young, Price concluded that geologists had misinterpreted their data. In 1902, Price completed the manuscript Outlines of Modern Christianity and Modern Science before leaving Tracadie to serve brief stints as an Adventist evangelist on Prince Edward Island and the head of a new Adventist boarding academy in Nova Scotia. He briefly returned to book-selling in 1904, and then moved to New York City in an attempt to become a magazine and newspaper writer.

In a response to a plea from his wife, the Adventist church first employed Price as a construction worker in Maryland. He then was principal of a small Adventist school in Oakland, California, before becoming a construction worker and handyman at a newly purchased Adventist sanitarium in Loma Linda, California, where he published Illogical Geology: The Weakest Point in the Evolution Theory in 1906. In Illogical Geology, Price offered $1000 "to any one who will, in the face of the facts here presented, show me how to prove that one kind of fossil is older than another."

From 1907 to 1912, Price taught at the Seventh-day Adventist-run College of Medical Evangelists, now known as Loma Linda University, which awarded him a B.A., based partially on his authorship and independent study. From 1912 to 1914, he taught at the San Fernando Academy in San Fernando, California, and from 1914 to 1916 at Lodi Academy, Lodi, California.

Beginning in 1920, Price taught at Pacific Union College, Angwin, California, where he was awarded an M.A. (described by Ronald L. Numbers as a "gift"). From 1924 to 1928, Price taught at Stanborough Missionary College in Watford, England, where he served as president from 1927 to 1928. He then taught at Emmanual Missionary College (now Andrews University) in Berrien Springs, Michigan from 1929 to 1933, and Walla Walla College near Walla Walla, Washington from 1933 to 1938.

While Price claimed that his book-selling travels gave him invaluable "firsthand knowledge of field geology", his "familiarity with the outside world" remained rudimentary, with even his own students noting that he could "barely tell one fossil from another" on a field trip shortly before he retired.

In 1943, he moved to Loma Linda, California, where he died 20 years later at the age of 92.

== Reception ==
In 1906 David Starr Jordan, president of Stanford University, and a leading American expert on fossil fishes, wrote a review of Price's Illogical Geology, in which he stated that Price should not expect "any geologist to take [his work] seriously." This led to a correspondence over the next twenty years in which Price once promised "to become an evolutionist within twenty-four hours" if "the foremost ichthyologist in the world" could prove that one fossil was older than another, and Jordan attempted to enlighten Price that his views were:

based on scattering mistakes, omissions, and exceptions against general truths that anybody familiar with the facts in a general way can not possibly dispute.

Jordan also unsuccessfully urged Price to "undertake some constructive work in Paleontology in the field and in laboratories."

Numbers says that Seventh-day Adventism is grounded on the Sabbath doctrine of a literal Creation week. To Price, the Sabbath doctrine is what saved Adventists from evolutionism. He adopted Ellen G. White's position on creationism as his own and he sought to persuade the world that a recent creation was required by the Bible and science.

Price criticized the 'geologic ages' and strict Lyellian uniformitarianism on which he thought they were based. As an alternative explanation of the geology of the earth, he re-invented Flood geology. He pondered ways to reinterpret the apparent order of the fossils that seemingly implied ancient bygone eras. After studying a wide variety of geologic literature, Price deduced that the "facts of the rocks and fossils, stripped of mere theories, splendidly refute this evolutionary theory of the invariable order of the fossils, which is the very backbone of the evolutionary doctrine." He had read of strata containing fossils of a young era lying conformably on strata containing fossils of very old eras. The geologist who described these lithically identical layers said that "one would naturally suppose that a single formation was being dealt with, were it not for fossil evidence." To Price, that, and the lack of any evidence of erosion between the strata, implied that little time could have occurred between the two layers of rock. Price also discovered in the literature examples of similar conformable strata, but in the reverse order, the old rocks on top and the young strata below according to interpretation of the fossils. Although appearing "to succeed one another conformably" the Canadian Geologic Survey contended for over-thrusting principally based on the fossil content. Price's interpretation of the evidence was that "the geological record does not prove succession of ages, but rather shows a "taxonomic" series representing different but contemporaneous zones of antediluvian life."

So, in Price's 1913 book, The Fundamentals of Geology, an expanded version of Illogical Geology, he presented the "Law of Conformable Stratigraphic Sequences" which states "any kind of fossiliferous rock may occur conformably on any other kind of fossiliferous rock, old or young." To Price this law was "by all odds the most important law ever formulated with reference to the order in which the strata occur."

Yale geologist Schuchert's review of The New Geology for the magazine Science stated that Price was "harboring a geological nightmare". However, the creationists welcomed the new book. Harry Rimmer claimed that it was "a masterpiece of REAL science [that] explodes in a convincing manner some of the ancient fallacies of science 'falsely so called'". Within a couple of years, Price appeared prominently in several conservative religious periodicals. A Science editor described him as "the principal scientific authority of the Fundamentalists".

Price, concerned about scientific methodology, had read Whithead and other philosophers and understood that facts were always subject to interpretation. While Price was confident that "inductive geology" inferred a recent Creation, he acknowledged that debate between creationism and naturalism lay outside of science, "across the boundary-line in the domain of philosophy and theology." He claimed that naturalists regarded facts "through the colored spectacles of Darwin and Lyell" while Creationists used the Bible to interpret the natural world. He said that the Creationist account of origins could never have been developed as a hypothesis from the study of nature alone, rather it was "suggested by our religion." In choosing between "the two alternatives now before the world," naturalistic geology versus world-catastrophe, there was but one suitable inquiry: "Will it give the most rational account nature's evidence?"

Price's defense of creation science (and attacks on evolution) first achieved wide notability in 1925 when his theories and arguments were utilized heavily by William Jennings Bryan in the famous Scopes Trial. Bryan had appealed to Price for assistance, but Price was busy teaching in England. Price advised Bryan to avoid science during the trial if possible. During the trial, defense counsel Clarence Darrow, sneered "You mentioned Price because he is the only human being in the world so far as you know that signs his name as a geologist that believes like you do . . . every scientist in this country knows [he] is a mountebank and a pretender and not a geologist at all."

Price's ideas were borrowed again in the early 1960s by Henry M. Morris and John Whitcomb in their book The Genesis Flood, a work that skeptic Martin Gardner calls "the most significant attack on evolution...since the Scopes trial". Morris, in his 1984 book History of Modern Creationism, spoke glowingly of Price's logic and writing style, and referred to reading The New Geology as "a life-changing experience for me".

== Comments about Old Earth creationists ==
Price was more conservative in his views than Old Earth creationists such as William Jennings Bryan, Harry Rimmer or William Bell Riley. Contrary to Bryan, Rimmer and Riley, Price rejected the idea of a local flood and insisted on a pure literal 6-day creation consisting of six 24-hour days. He felt that Riley's day-age creationist views were "the devil's counterfeit". Price was equally dismissive of Rimmer, and his gap creationism for most of his career.

== Bibliography ==
- Outlines of Modern Christianity and Modern Science (1902)
- Illogical Geology. George McCready Price. 1906. ISBN 9780837047973.
- God's two books; or, Plain facts about evolution, geology, and the Bible (1911)
- The Fundamentals of Geology and their Bearings on the Doctrine of a Literal Creation (1913)
- Q.E.D.; or, New light on the doctrine of creation (1917)
- A Textbook of General Science for Secondary Schools (1917)
- Back to the Bible: or, The new Protestantism (1920)
- Geography and Geology (1920)
- Poisoning Democracy: A Study of the Moral and Religious Aspects of Socialism. Fleming H. Revell. 1921. OCLC 2156114.
- Socialism in the Test-Tube: A Candid Discussion of the Principles, the Relations, and the Effects of Socialism (1921)
- Nature Study and Astronomy. Part I: Nature Study. Edited by George McCready Price, Part II: Astronomy. Edited by Eric Doolittle (1921)
- The Fossils as Age-Markers in Geology (1922)
- The New Geology (1923)
- Science and Religion in a Nutshell (1923)
- The Phantom of Organic Evolution (1924)
- Fundamentalism (1924)
- The Predicament of Evolution (1925) online
- Evolutionary Geology and the New Catastrophism. Pacific Press. 1926.
- Is Evolution True?: Verbatim Report of Debate Between George McCready Price and Joseph McCabe held at the Queen's Hall, Langham Place, London, W., on September 6, 1925 (1925)
- The Phantom of Organic Evolution (1925)
- Modern Botany and the Theory of Organic Evolution (1926)
- Letter to the Editor of Science from the Principal Scientific Authority of the Fundamentalists (1926),
- On Being a Good Scientific Sport (1926?)
- Evolution and the Sabbath (192?)
- A History of Some Scientific Blunders (1930)
- The Geological-Ages Hoax: A Plea for Logic in Theoretical Geology (1931)
- Did a Good God Make a Bad World?: A Consideration of the Age-Long Problem of the Origin of Evil and the Justice of God (193?)
- Modern Discoveries which Help us to Believe (1934)
- The Modern Flood Theory of Geology (1935)
- Some Scientific Stories and Allegories (1936)
- Genesis Vindicated (1941)
- How Did the World Begin? (1942)
- If You Were the Creator: A Reasonable Credo for Modern Man (1942)
- Some Cyclic Phenomena in Stratigraphic Geology (1943)
- Common-Sense Geology (1946)
- Feet of Clay: The Unscientific Nonsense of Historical Geology (1949)
- Were the Fossils Contemporary? (1949)
- The Man from Mars (1949)
- Theories of Satanic Origin (195?)
- The Greatest of the Prophets: A New Commentary on Daniel and the Revelation (1951)
- The Story of the Fossils (1954)
- Problems and Methods in Geology (1956)
- Poems of my Long Ago (1959)
- One World, One Religion (1963)
- The Time of the End (1967)
- Report on Evolution (1971)
- When and What is Armageddon? (?)
