= John D. Morris =

American creationist

John Morris
- Born: 7 December 1946
- Died: 29 January 2023 (aged 76)
- Education: Virginia Tech (BS); University of Oklahoma (MS, PhD)
- Occupation: President of the Institute for Creation Research
- Predecessor: Henry M. Morris
- Successor: Randy J. Guliuzza

John David Morris (7 December 1946 – 29 January 2023) was an American young earth creationist. He was the son of "the father of creation science", Henry M. Morris, and served as president of the Institute for Creation Research (ICR) from the time of his father's retirement in 1996 until 2020. Morris was a creationist author and spoke at a variety of churches. Many of his presentations discussed the fossil record and its relation to evolution.

== Biography ==
Morris earned a Bachelor of Science in civil engineering from Virginia Tech (1969), a Master of Science from the University of Oklahoma (1977) and a Ph.D. in geological engineering from the University of Oklahoma (1980). In 1984 he joined the Institute for Creation Research and in 1996 he became its president.

== Criticism ==
Critics have disputed Morris' claims. For instance, the following statement by Morris:

From the neck down, certain clues suggested to Johanson that Lucy walked a little more erect than today's chimps. This conclusion, based on his interpretation of the partial hip bone and a knee bone, has been hotly contested by many paleoanthropologists!

... elicited the following response from Jim Foley in the TalkOrigins Archive:

Almost everything in this quote is a distortion (Johanson's and Lucy's names are about the only exceptions). "Certain clues suggested" doesn't mention that the whole find screamed "bipedality" to every qualified scientist who looked at it. "A little more erect", when everyone believes that Lucy was fully erect. "The partial hip bone and a knee bone", when Lucy included almost a complete pelvis and leg (taking mirror imaging into account, and excluding the foot). "Has been hotly contested", when no reputable paleoanthropologist denies that Lucy was bipedal. The debates are about whether she was also arboreal, and about how similar the biomechanics of her locomotion was to that of humans. Given that we have most of Lucy's leg and pelvis, one has to wonder what sort of fossil evidence it would take to convince creationists of australopithecine bipedality.

== Books ==
- Adventure on Ararat. Institute for Creation Research. 1973.
- Tracking Those Incredible Dinosaurs ... and the People Who Knew Them. CLP Publishers. 1980. ISBN 0-89051-067-9.
- Noah's Ark and the Ararat Adventure. Master Books. 1988. ISBN 0-89051-166-7.
- What Really Happened to the Dinosaurs?. Master Books. 1990. ISBN 0-89051-159-4.
- The Young Earth. Master Books. 1994. ISBN 0-89051-174-8.
- The Modern Creation Trilogy: Scripture and Creation, Science and Creation, Society and Creation. Master Books. 1996. ISBN 0-89051-216-7.
- A Trip to the Ocean. Master Books. 2000. ISBN 0-89051-285-X.
- The Geology Book. Master Books. 2000. ISBN 0-89051-281-7.
- Signs of Design: Timeless Truths from Nature. Master Books. 2002. ISBN 0-89051-367-8.

== See also ==
- Creation–evolution controversy
- Lucy (Australopithecus)
- Australopithecines
