= Creation science =

Pseudoscientific form of Young Earth creationism

Creation science or scientific creationism is a pseudoscientific form of young Earth creationism which claims to offer scientific arguments for certain literalist and inerrantist interpretations of the Bible. It is often presented without overt faith-based language, but instead relies on reinterpreting scientific results to argue that various myths in the Book of Genesis and other select biblical passages are scientifically valid. The most commonly advanced ideas of creation science include special creation based on the Genesis creation narrative and flood geology based on the Genesis flood narrative. Creationists also claim they can disprove or reexplain a variety of scientific facts, theories and paradigms of geology, cosmology, biological evolution, archaeology, history, and linguistics using creation science. Creation science was foundational to intelligent design.

The overwhelming consensus of the scientific community is that creation science fails to qualify as scientific because it lacks empirical support, supplies no testable hypotheses, and resolves to describe natural history in terms of scientifically untestable supernatural causes. Courts, most often in the United States where the question has been asked in the context of teaching the subject in public schools, have consistently ruled since the 1980s that creation science is a religious view rather than a scientific one. Historians, philosophers of science and skeptics have described creation science as a pseudoscientific attempt to map the Bible into scientific facts. Professional biologists have criticized creation science for being unscholarly, and even as a dishonest and misguided sham, with extremely harmful educational consequences.

== Beliefs and activities ==
=== Religious basis ===
Creation science is based largely upon chapters 1-11 of the Book of Genesis. These describe how God calls the world into existence through the power of speech ("And God said, Let there be light," etc.) in six days, calls all the animals and plants into existence, and molds the first man from clay and the first woman from a rib taken from the man's side; a worldwide flood destroys all life except for Noah and his family and representatives of the animals, and Noah becomes the ancestor of the 70 "nations" of the world; the nations live together until the incident of the Tower of Babel, when God disperses them and gives them their different languages. Creation science attempts to explain history and science within the span of Biblical chronology, which places the initial act of creation some six thousand years ago.

=== Modern religious affiliations ===
Most creation science proponents hold fundamentalist or Evangelical Christian beliefs in Biblical literalism or Biblical inerrancy, as opposed to the higher criticism supported by liberal Christianity in the Fundamentalist–Modernist Controversy. However, there are also examples of Islamic and Jewish scientific creationism that conform to the accounts of creation as recorded in their religious doctrines.

The Seventh-day Adventist Church has a history of support for creation science. This dates back to George McCready Price, an active Seventh-day Adventist who developed views of flood geology, which formed the basis of creation science. This work was continued by the Geoscience Research Institute, an official institute of the Seventh-day Adventist Church, located on its Loma Linda University campus in California.

Creation science is generally rejected by the Church of England as well as the Roman Catholic Church. The Pontifical Gregorian University has officially discussed intelligent design as a "cultural phenomenon" without scientific elements. The Church of England's official website cites Charles Darwin's local work assisting people in his religious parish.

=== Views on science ===
Creation science rejects evolution and the common descent of all living things on Earth. Instead, it asserts that the field of evolutionary biology is itself pseudoscientific or even a religion. Creationists argue instead for a system called baraminology, which considers the living world to be descended from uniquely created kinds or "baramins."

Creation science incorporates the concept of catastrophism to reconcile current landforms and fossil distributions with Biblical interpretations, proposing the remains resulted from successive cataclysmic events, such as a worldwide flood and subsequent ice age. It rejects one of the fundamental principles of modern geology (and of modern science generally), uniformitarianism, which applies the same physical and geological laws observed on the Earth today to interpret the Earth's geological history.

Sometimes creationists attack other scientific concepts, like the Big Bang cosmological model or methods of scientific dating based upon radioactive decay. Young Earth creationists also reject current estimates of the age of the universe and the age of the Earth, arguing for creationist cosmologies with timescales much shorter than those determined by modern physical cosmology and geological science, typically less than 10,000 years.

The scientific community has overwhelmingly rejected the ideas put forth in creation science as lying outside the boundaries of a legitimate science. The foundational premises underlying scientific creationism disqualify it as a science because the answers to all inquiry therein are preordained to conform to Bible doctrine, and because that inquiry is constructed upon theories which are not empirically testable in nature.

Scientists also deem creation science's attacks against biological evolution to be without scientific merit. The views of the scientific community were accepted in two significant court decisions in the 1980s, which found the field of creation science to be a religious mode of inquiry, not a scientific one.

== History ==
Creation science began in the 1960s, as a fundamentalist Christian effort in the United States to prove Biblical inerrancy and nullify the scientific evidence for evolution. It has since developed a sizable religious following in the United States, with creation science ministries branching worldwide. The main ideas in creation science are: the belief in creation ex nihilo (Latin: out of nothing); the conviction that the Earth was created within the last 6,000–10,000 years; the belief that humans and other life on Earth were created as distinct fixed "baraminological" kinds; and "flood geology" or the idea that fossils found in geological strata were deposited during a cataclysmic flood which completely covered the entire Earth. As a result, creationists also challenge the geologic and astrophysical measurements of the age of the Earth and the universe along with their origins, which creationists believe are irreconcilable with the account in the Book of Genesis. Creation science proponents often refer to the theory of evolution as "Darwinism" or as "Darwinian evolution."

The creation science texts and curricula that first emerged in the 1960s focused upon concepts derived from a literal interpretation of the Bible and were overtly religious in nature, most notably proposing Noah's flood in the Biblical Genesis account as an explanation for the geological and fossil record. These works attracted little notice beyond the schools and congregations of conservative fundamental and Evangelical Christians until the 1970s, when its followers challenged the teaching of evolution in the public schools and other venues in the United States, bringing it to the attention of the public-at-large and the scientific community. Many school boards and lawmakers were persuaded to include the teaching of creation science alongside evolution in the science curriculum. Creation science texts and curricula used in churches and Christian schools were revised to eliminate their Biblical and theological references, and less explicitly sectarian versions of creation science education were introduced in public schools in Louisiana, Arkansas, and other regions in the United States.

The 1982 ruling in McLean v. Arkansas found that creation science fails to meet the essential characteristics of science and that its chief intent is to advance a particular religious view. The teaching of creation science in public schools in the United States effectively ended in 1987 following the United States Supreme Court decision in Edwards v. Aguillard. The court affirmed that a statute requiring the teaching of creation science alongside evolution when evolution is taught in Louisiana public schools was unconstitutional because its sole true purpose was to advance a particular religious belief.

In response to this ruling, drafts of the creation science school textbook Of Pandas and People were edited to change references of creation to intelligent design before its publication in 1989. The intelligent design movement promoted this version. Requiring intelligent design to be taught in public school science classes was found to be unconstitutional in the 2005 Kitzmiller v. Dover Area School District federal court case.

=== Before 1960s ===
The teaching of evolution was gradually introduced into more and more public high school textbooks in the United States after 1900, but in the aftermath of the First World War the growth of fundamentalist Christianity gave rise to a creationist opposition to such teaching. Legislation prohibiting the teaching of evolution was passed in certain regions, most notably Tennessee's Butler Act of 1925.

The Soviet Union's successful launch of Sputnik 1 in 1957 sparked national concern that the science education in public schools was outdated. In 1958, the United States passed National Defense Education Act which introduced new education guidelines for science instruction. With federal grant funding, the Biological Sciences Curriculum Study (BSCS) drafted new standards for the public schools' science textbooks which included the teaching of evolution. Almost half the nation's high schools were using textbooks based on the guidelines of the BSCS soon after they were published in 1963.

The Tennessee legislature did not repeal the Butler Act until 1967.

Creation science (dubbed "scientific creationism" at the time) emerged as an organized movement during the 1960s. It was strongly influenced by the earlier work of armchair geologist George McCready Price who wrote works such as Illogical Geology: The Weakest Point in the Evolution Theory (1906) and The New Geology (1923) to advance what he termed "new catastrophism" and dispute the current geological time frames and explanations of geologic history. Price was cited at the Scopes Trial of 1925, but his writings had no credence among geologists and other scientists. Price's "new catastrophism" was also disputed by most other creationists until its revival with the 1961 publication of The Genesis Flood by John C. Whitcomb and Henry M. Morris, a work which quickly became an important text on the issue to fundamentalist Christians and expanded the field of creation science beyond critiques of geology into biology and cosmology as well. Soon after its publication, a movement was underway to have the subject taught in United States' public schools.

=== Court determinations ===
The various state laws prohibiting teaching of evolution were overturned in 1968 when the United States Supreme Court ruled in Epperson v. Arkansas such laws violated the Establishment Clause of the First Amendment to the United States Constitution. This ruling inspired a new creationist movement to promote laws requiring that schools give balanced treatment to creation science when evolution is taught. The 1981 Arkansas Act 590 was one such law that carefully detailed the principles of creation science that were to receive equal time in public schools alongside evolutionary principles. The act defined creation science as follows:

"'Creation-science' means the scientific evidences for creation and inferences from those evidences. Creation-science includes the scientific evidences and related inferences that indicate:

1. Sudden creation of the universe, and, in particular, life, from nothing;
2. The insufficiency of mutation and natural selection in bringing about development of all living kinds from a single organism;
3. Changes only with fixed limits of originally created kinds of plants and animals;
4. Separate ancestry for man and apes;
5. Explanation of the earth's geology by catastrophism, including the occurrence of worldwide flood; and
6. A relatively recent inception of the earth and living kinds."

This legislation was examined in McLean v. Arkansas, and the ruling handed down on January 5, 1982, concluded that creation-science as defined in the act "is simply not science". The judgement defined the following as essential characteristics of science:

1. It is guided by natural law;
2. It has to be explanatory by reference to nature law;
3. It is testable against the empirical world;
4. Its conclusions are tentative, i.e., are not necessarily the final word; and
5. It is falsifiable.

The court ruled that creation science failed to meet these essential characteristics and identified specific reasons. After examining the key concepts from creation science, the court found:

1. Sudden creation "from nothing" calls upon a supernatural intervention, not natural law, and is neither testable nor falsifiable
2. Objections in creation science that mutation and natural selection are insufficient to explain common origins was an incomplete negative generalization
3. 'Kinds' are not scientific classifications, and creation science's claims of an outer limit to the evolutionary change possible of species are not explained scientifically or by natural law
4. The separate ancestry of man and apes is an assertion rather than a scientific explanation, and did not derive from any scientific fact or theory
5. Catastrophism, including its identification of the worldwide flood, failed as a science
6. "Relatively recent inception" was the product of religious readings and had no scientific meaning, and was neither the product of, nor explainable by, natural law; nor is it tentative

The court further noted that no recognized scientific journal had published any article espousing the creation science theory as described in the Arkansas law, and stated that the testimony presented by defense attributing the absence to censorship was not credible.

In its ruling, the court wrote that for any theory to qualify as scientific, the theory must be tentative, and open to revision or abandonment as new facts come to light. It wrote that any methodology which begins with an immutable conclusion that cannot be revised or rejected, regardless of the evidence, is not a scientific theory. The court found that creation science does not culminate in conclusions formed from scientific inquiry, but instead begins with the conclusion, one taken from a literal wording of the Book of Genesis, and seeks only scientific evidence to support it.

The law in Arkansas adopted the same two-model approach as that put forward by the Institute for Creation Research, one allowing only two possible explanations for the origins of life and existence of man, plants and animals: it was either the work of a creator or it was not. Scientific evidence that failed to support the theory of evolution was posed as necessarily scientific evidence in support of creationism, but in its judgment the court ruled this approach to be no more than a "contrived dualism which has not scientific factual basis or legitimate educational purpose."

The judge concluded that "Act 590 is a religious crusade, coupled with a desire to conceal this fact," and that it violated the First Amendment's Establishment Clause. The decision was not appealed to a higher court, but had a powerful influence on subsequent rulings. Louisiana's 1982 Balanced Treatment for Creation-Science and Evolution-Science Act, authored by State Senator Bill P. Keith, judged in the 1987 United States Supreme Court case Edwards v. Aguillard, and was handed a similar ruling. It found the law to require the balanced teaching of creation science with evolution had a particular religious purpose and was therefore unconstitutional.

=== Intelligent design splits off ===
In 1984, The Mystery of Life's Origin was first published. It was co-authored by chemist and creationist Charles B. Thaxton with Walter L. Bradley and Roger L. Olsen, the foreword written by Dean H. Kenyon, and sponsored by the Christian-based Foundation for Thought and Ethics (FTE). The work presented scientific arguments against current theories of abiogenesis and offered a hypothesis of special creation instead. While the focus of creation science had until that time centered primarily on the criticism of the fossil evidence for evolution and validation of the creation myth of the Bible, this new work posed the question whether science reveals that even the simplest living systems were far too complex to have developed by natural, unguided processes.

Kenyon later co-wrote with creationist Percival Davis a book intended as a "scientific brief for creationism" to use as a supplement to public high school biology textbooks. Thaxton was enlisted as the book's editor, and the book received publishing support from the FTE. Prior to its release, the 1987 Supreme Court ruling in Edwards v. Aguillard barred the teaching of creation science and creationism in public school classrooms. The book, originally titled Biology and Creation but renamed Of Pandas and People, was released in 1989 and became the first published work to promote the anti-evolutionist design argument under the name intelligent design. The contents of the book later became a focus of evidence in the federal court case, Kitzmiller v. Dover Area School District, when a group of parents filed suit to halt the teaching of intelligent design in Dover, Pennsylvania, public schools. School board officials there had attempted to include Of Pandas and People in their biology classrooms and testimony given during the trial revealed the book was originally written as a creationist text but following the adverse decision in the Supreme Court it underwent simple cosmetic editing to remove the explicit allusions to "creation" or "creator," and replace them instead with references to "design" or "designer."

By the mid-1990s, intelligent design had become a separate movement. The creation science movement is distinguished from the intelligent design movement, or neo-creationism, because most advocates of creation science accept scripture as a literal and inerrant historical account, and their primary goal is to corroborate the scriptural account through the use of science. In contrast, as a matter of principle, neo-creationism eschews references to scripture altogether in its polemics and stated goals (see Wedge strategy). By so doing, intelligent design proponents have attempted to succeed where creation science has failed in securing a place in public school science curricula. Carefully avoiding any reference to the identity of the intelligent designer as God in their public arguments, intelligent design proponents sought to reintroduce the creationist ideas into science classrooms while sidestepping the First Amendment's prohibition against religious infringement. However, the intelligent design curriculum was struck down as a violation of the Establishment Clause in Kitzmiller v. Dover Area School District, the judge in the case ruled "that ID is nothing less than the progeny of creationism."

Today, creation science as an organized movement is primarily centered within the United States. Creation science organizations are also known in other countries, most notably Creation Ministries International which was founded (under the name Creation Science Foundation) in Australia. Proponents are usually aligned with a Christian denomination, primarily with those characterized as evangelical, conservative, or fundamentalist. While creationist movements also exist in Islam and Judaism, these movements do not use the phrase creation science to describe their beliefs.

== Issues ==
Creation science has its roots in the work of young Earth creationist George McCready Price disputing modern science's account of natural history, focusing particularly on geology and its concept of uniformitarianism, and his efforts instead to furnish an alternative empirical explanation of observable phenomena which was compatible with strict Biblical literalism. Price's work was later discovered by civil engineer Henry M. Morris, who is now considered to be the father of creation science. Morris and later creationists expanded the scope with attacks against the broad spectrum scientific findings that point to the antiquity of the Universe and common ancestry among species, including growing body of evidence from the fossil record, absolute dating techniques, and cosmogony.

The proponents of creation science often say that they are concerned with religious and moral questions as well as natural observations and predictive hypotheses. Many state that their opposition to scientific evolution is primarily based on religion.

The overwhelming majority of scientists are in agreement that the claims of science are necessarily limited to those that develop from natural observations and experiments which can be replicated and substantiated by other scientists, and that claims made by creation science do not meet those criteria. Duane Gish, a prominent creation science proponent, has similarly claimed, "We do not know how the creator created, what processes He used, for He used processes which are not now operating anywhere in the natural universe. This is why we refer to creation as special creation. We cannot discover by scientific investigation anything about the creative processes used by the Creator." But he also makes the same claim against science's evolutionary theory, maintaining that on the subject of origins, scientific evolution is a religious theory which cannot be validated by science.

=== Metaphysical assumptions ===
Creation science makes the a priori metaphysical assumption that there exists a creator of the life whose origin is being examined. Christian creation science holds that the description of creation is given in the Bible, that the Bible is inerrant in this description (and elsewhere), and therefore empirical scientific evidence must correspond with that description. Creationists also view the preclusion of all supernatural explanations within the sciences as a doctrinaire commitment to exclude the supreme being and miracles. They claim this to be the motivating factor in science's acceptance of Darwinism, a term used in creation science to refer to evolutionary biology which is also often used as a disparagement. Critics argue that creation science is religious rather than scientific because it stems from faith in a religious text rather than by the application of the scientific method. The United States National Academy of Sciences (NAS) has stated unequivocally, "Evolution pervades all biological phenomena. To ignore that it occurred or to classify it as a form of dogma is to deprive the student of the most fundamental organizational concept in the biological sciences. No other biological concept has been more extensively tested and more thoroughly corroborated than the evolutionary history of organisms." Anthropologist Eugenie Scott has noted further, "Religious opposition to evolution propels antievolutionism. Although antievolutionists pay lip service to supposed scientific problems with evolution, what motivates them to battle its teaching is apprehension over the implications of evolution for religion."

Creation science advocates argue that scientific theories of the origins of the Universe, Earth, and life are rooted in a priori presumptions of methodological naturalism and uniformitarianism, each of which they reject. In some areas of science such as chemistry, meteorology or medicine, creation science proponents do not necessarily challenge the application of naturalistic or uniformitarian assumptions, but instead single out those scientific theories they judge to be in conflict with their religious beliefs, and it is against those theories that they concentrate their efforts.

=== Religious criticism ===
Many mainstream Christian churches criticize creation science on theological grounds, asserting either that religious faith alone should be a sufficient basis for belief in the truth of creation, or that efforts to prove the Genesis account of creation on scientific grounds are inherently futile because reason is subordinate to faith and cannot thus be used to prove it.

Many Christian theologies, including Liberal Christianity, consider the Genesis creation narrative to be a poetic and allegorical work rather than a literal history, and many Christian churches—including the Eastern Orthodox Church, the Roman Catholic, Anglican and the more liberal denominations of the Lutheran, Methodist, Congregationalist and Presbyterian faiths—have either rejected creation science outright or are ambivalent to it. Belief in non-literal interpretations of Genesis is often cited as going back to Saint Augustine.

Theistic evolution and evolutionary creationism are theologies that reconcile belief in a creator with biological evolution. Each holds the view that there is a creator but that this creator has employed the natural force of evolution to unfold a divine plan. Religious representatives from faiths compatible with theistic evolution and evolutionary creationism have challenged the growing perception that belief in a creator is inconsistent with the acceptance of evolutionary theory. Spokespersons from the Catholic Church have specifically criticized biblical creationism for relying upon literal interpretations of biblical scripture as the basis for determining scientific fact.

=== Scientific criticism ===
Creation science
- Claims: The Bible contains an accurate literal account of the origin of the Universe, Earth, life and humanity.
- Related scientific disciplines: Anthropology, biology, geology, astronomy
- Year proposed: 1923
- Original proponents: George McCready Price, Henry M. Morris, and John C. Whitcomb
- Subsequent proponents: Institute for Creation Research, Answers in Genesis

The National Academy of Sciences states that "the claims of creation science lack empirical support and cannot be meaningfully tested" and that "creation science is in fact not science and should not be presented as such in science classes." According to Joyce Arthur writing for Skeptic magazine, the "creation 'science' movement gains much of its strength through the use of distortion and scientifically unethical tactics" and "seriously misrepresents the theory of evolution."

Scientists have considered the hypotheses proposed by creation science and have rejected them because of a lack of evidence. Furthermore, the claims of creation science do not refer to natural causes and cannot be subject to meaningful tests, so they do not qualify as scientific hypotheses. In 1987, the United States Supreme Court ruled that creationism is religion, not science, and cannot be advocated in public school classrooms. Most mainline Christian denominations have concluded that the concept of evolution is not at odds with their descriptions of creation and human origins.

A summary of the objections to creation science by scientists follows:

- Creation science is not falsifiable: An idea or hypothesis is generally not considered to be in the realm of science unless it can be potentially disproved with certain experiments, this is the concept of falsifiability in science. The act of creation as defined in creation science is not falsifiable because no testable bounds can be imposed on the creator. In creation science, the creator is defined as limitless, with the capacity to create (or not), through fiat alone, infinite universes, not just one, and endow each one with its own unique, unimaginable and incomparable character. It is impossible to disprove a claim when that claim as defined encompasses every conceivable contingency.
- Creation science violates the principle of parsimony: Parsimony favours those explanations which rely on the fewest assumptions. Scientists prefer explanations that are consistent with known and supported facts and evidence and require the fewest assumptions to fill the remaining gaps. Many of the alternative claims made in creation science retreat from simpler scientific explanations and introduce more complications and conjecture into the equation.
- Creation science is not, and cannot be, empirically or experimentally tested: Creationism posits supernatural causes which lie outside the realm of methodological naturalism and scientific experiment. Science can only test empirical, natural claims.
- Creation science is not correctable, dynamic, tentative or progressive: Creation science adheres to a fixed and unchanging premise or "absolute truth," the "word of God," which is not open to change. Any evidence that runs contrary to that truth must be disregarded. In science, all claims are tentative, they are forever open to challenge, and must be discarded or adjusted when the weight of evidence demands it.

By invoking claims of "abrupt appearance" of species as a miraculous act, creation science is unsuited for the tools and methods demanded by science, and it cannot be considered scientific in the way that the term "science" is currently defined. Scientists and science writers commonly characterize creation science as a pseudoscience.

=== Historical, philosophical, and sociological criticism ===
Historically, the debate of whether creationism is compatible with science can be traced back to 1874, the year science historian John William Draper published his History of the Conflict between Religion and Science. In it Draper portrayed the entire history of scientific development as a war against religion. This presentation of history was propagated further by followers such as Andrew Dickson White in his two-volume A History of the Warfare of Science with Theology in Christendom (1896). Their conclusions have been disputed.

In the United States, the principal focus of creation science advocates is on the government-supported public school systems, which are prohibited by the Establishment Clause from promoting specific religions. Historical communities have argued that Biblical translations contain many translation errors and errata, and therefore that the use of biblical literalism in creation science is self-contradictory.

== Kinds of creation science ==
=== Biology ===
Creationist arguments in relation to biology center on an idea derived from Genesis that states that life was created by God, in a finite number of "created kinds," rather than through biological evolution from a common ancestor. Creationists contend that any observable speciation descends from these distinctly created kinds through inbreeding, deleterious mutations and other genetic mechanisms. Whereas evolutionary biologists and creationists share similar views of microevolution, creationists reject the fact that the process of macroevolution can explain common ancestry among organisms far beyond the level of common species. Creationists contend that there is no empirical evidence for new plant or animal species, and deny fossil evidence has ever been found documenting the process.

Popular arguments against evolution have changed since the publishing of Henry M. Morris' first book on the subject, Scientific Creationism (1974), but some consistent themes remain: that missing links or gaps in the fossil record are proof against evolution; that the increased complexity of organisms over time through evolution is not possible due to the law of increasing entropy; that it is impossible that the mechanism of natural selection could account for common ancestry; and that evolutionary theory is untestable. The origin of the human species is particularly hotly contested; the fossil remains of hominid ancestors are not considered by advocates of creation biology to be evidence for a speciation event involving Homo sapiens. Creationists also assert that early hominids, are either apes, or humans.

Richard Dawkins has explained evolution as "a theory of gradual, incremental change over millions of years, which starts with something very simple and works up along slow, gradual gradients to greater complexity," and described the existing fossil record as entirely consistent with that process. Biologists emphasize that transitional gaps between recovered fossils are to be expected, that the existence of any such gaps cannot be invoked to disprove evolution, and that instead the fossil evidence that could be used to disprove the theory would be those fossils which are found and which are entirely inconsistent with what can be predicted or anticipated by the evolutionary model. One example given by Dawkins was, "If there were a single hippo or rabbit in the Precambrian, that would completely blow evolution out of the water. None have ever been found."

=== Geology ===
==== Flood geology ====
Flood geology is a concept based on the belief that most of Earth's geological record was formed by the Great Flood described in the story of Noah's Ark. Fossils and fossil fuels are believed to have formed from animal and plant matter which was buried rapidly during this flood, while submarine canyons are explained as having formed during a rapid runoff from the continents at the end of the flood. Sedimentary strata are also claimed to have been predominantly laid down during or after Noah's flood and orogeny. Flood geology is a variant of catastrophism and is contrasted with geological science in that it rejects standard geological principles such as uniformitarianism and radiometric dating. For example, the Creation Research Society argues that "uniformitarianism is wishful thinking."

Geologists conclude that no evidence for such a flood is observed in the preserved rock layers and moreover that such a flood is physically impossible, given the current layout of land masses. For instance, since Mount Everest currently is approximately 8.8 kilometres in elevation and the Earth's surface area is 510,065,600 km^{2}, the volume of water required to cover Mount Everest to a depth of 15 cubits (6.8 m), as indicated by Genesis 7:20, would be 4.6 billion cubic kilometres. Measurements of the amount of precipitable water vapor in the atmosphere have yielded results indicating that condensing all water vapor in a column of atmosphere would produce liquid water with a depth ranging between zero and approximately 70mm, depending on the date and the location of the column. Nevertheless, there continue to be adherents to the belief in flood geology, and in recent years new creationist models have been introduced such as catastrophic plate tectonics and catastrophic orogeny.

==== Radiometric dating ====
Creationists point to flawed experiments they have performed, which they claim demonstrate that 1.5 billion years of nuclear decay took place over a short period of time, from which they infer that "billion-fold speed-ups of nuclear decay" have occurred, a massive violation of the principle that radioisotope decay rates are constant, a core principle underlying nuclear physics generally, and radiometric dating in particular.

The scientific community points to numerous flaws in the creationists' experiments, to the fact that their results have not been accepted for publication by any peer-reviewed scientific journal, and to the fact that the creationist scientists conducting them were untrained in experimental geochronology. They have also been criticised for widely publicising the results of their research as successful despite their own admission of insurmountable problems with their hypothesis.

The constancy of the decay rates of isotopes is well supported in science. Evidence for this constancy includes the correspondences of date estimates taken from different radioactive isotopes as well as correspondences with non-radiometric dating techniques such as dendrochronology, ice core dating, and historical records. Although scientists have noted slight increases in the decay rate for isotopes subject to extreme pressures, those differences were too small to significantly impact date estimates. The constancy of the decay rates is also governed by first principles in quantum mechanics, wherein any deviation in the rate would require a change in the fundamental constants. According to these principles, a change in the fundamental constants could not influence different elements uniformly, and a comparison between each of the elements' resulting unique chronological timescales would then give inconsistent time estimates.

In refutation of young Earth claims of inconstant decay rates affecting the reliability of radiometric dating, Roger C. Wiens, a physicist specializing in isotope dating states:

There are only three quite technical instances where a half-life changes, and these do not affect the dating methods:

1. "Only one technical exception occurs under terrestrial conditions, and this is not for an isotope used for dating. ... The artificially-produced isotope, beryllium-7 has been shown to change by up to 1.5%, depending on its chemical environment. ... Heavier atoms are even less subject to these minute changes, so the dates of rocks made by electron-capture decays would only be off by at most a few hundredths of a percent."
2. "... Another case is material inside of stars, which is in a plasma state where electrons are not bound to atoms. In the extremely hot stellar environment, a completely different kind of decay can occur. 'Bound-state beta decay' occurs when the nucleus emits an electron into a bound electronic state close to the nucleus. ... All normal matter, such as everything on Earth, the Moon, meteorites, etc. has electrons in normal positions, so these instances never apply to rocks, or anything colder than several hundred thousand degrees."
3. "The last case also involves very fast-moving matter. It has been demonstrated by atomic clocks in very fast spacecraft. These atomic clocks slow down very slightly (only a second or so per year) as predicted by Einstein's theory of relativity. No rocks in our solar system are going fast enough to make a noticeable change in their dates."

==== Radiohaloes ====
In the 1970s, young Earth creationist Robert V. Gentry proposed that radiohaloes in certain granites represented evidence for the Earth being created instantaneously rather than gradually. This idea has been criticized by physicists and geologists on many grounds including that the rocks Gentry studied were not primordial and that the radionuclides in question need not have been in the rocks initially.

Thomas A. Baillieul, a geologist and retired senior environmental scientist with the United States Department of Energy, disputed Gentry's claims in an article entitled, "'Polonium Haloes' Refuted: A Review of 'Radioactive Halos in a Radio-Chronological and Cosmological Perspective' by Robert V. Gentry." Baillieul noted that Gentry was a physicist with no background in geology and given the absence of this background, Gentry had misrepresented the geological context from which the specimens were collected. Additionally, he noted that Gentry relied on research from the beginning of the 20th century, long before radioisotopes were thoroughly understood; that his assumption that a polonium isotope caused the rings was speculative; and that Gentry falsely argued that the half-life of radioactive elements varies with time. Gentry claimed that Baillieul could not publish his criticisms in a reputable scientific journal, although some of Baillieul's criticisms rested on work previously published in reputable scientific journals.

=== Astronomy and cosmology ===
==== Creationist cosmologies ====
Several attempts have been made by creationists to construct a cosmology consistent with a young Universe rather than the standard cosmological age of the universe, based on the belief that Genesis describes the creation of the Universe as well as the Earth. The primary challenge for young-universe cosmologies is that the accepted distances in the Universe require millions or billions of years for light to travel to Earth (the "starlight problem"). An older creationist idea, proposed by creationist astronomer Barry Setterfield, is that the speed of light has decayed in the history of the Universe. More recently, creationist physicist Russell Humphreys has proposed a hypothesis called "white hole cosmology", asserting that the Universe expanded out of a white hole less than 10,000 years ago; claiming that the age of the universe is illusory and results from relativistic effects. Humphreys' cosmology is advocated by creationist organisations such as Answers in Genesis; however because its predictions conflict with current observations, it is not accepted by the scientific community.

==== Planetology ====
Various claims are made by creationists concerning alleged evidence that the age of the Solar System is of the order of thousands of years, in contrast to the scientifically accepted age of 4.6 billion years. It is commonly argued that the number of comets in the Solar System is much higher than would be expected given its supposed age. Young Earth Creationists reject the existence of the Kuiper belt and Oort cloud. They also argue that the recession of the Moon from the Earth is incompatible with either the Moon or the Earth being billions of years old. These claims have been refuted by planetologists.

In response to increasing evidence suggesting that Mars once possessed a wetter climate, some creationists have proposed that the global flood affected not only the Earth but also Mars and other planets. People who support this claim include creationist astronomer Wayne Spencer and Russell Humphreys.

An ongoing problem for creationists is the presence of impact craters on nearly all Solar System objects, which is consistent with scientific explanations of solar system origins but creates insuperable problems for young Earth claims. Creationists Harold Slusher and Richard Mandock, along with Glenn Morton (who later repudiated this claim) asserted that impact craters on the Moon are subject to rock flow, and so cannot be more than a few thousand years old. While some creationist astronomers assert that different phases of meteoritic bombardment of the Solar System occurred during "creation week" and during the subsequent Great Flood, others regard this as unsupported by the evidence and call for further research.

== Groups ==
=== Proponents ===
- Answers in Genesis
- Creation Ministries International
- Creation Research Society
- Geoscience Research Institute
- Institute for Creation Research

=== Critics ===
- American Museum of Natural History
- National Science Teachers Association
- National Center for Science Education
- No Answers in Genesis
- National Academy of Sciences
- Scientific American
- The BioLogos Foundation
- The Skeptic's Dictionary
- Talk.reason
- TalkOrigins Archive

== See also ==
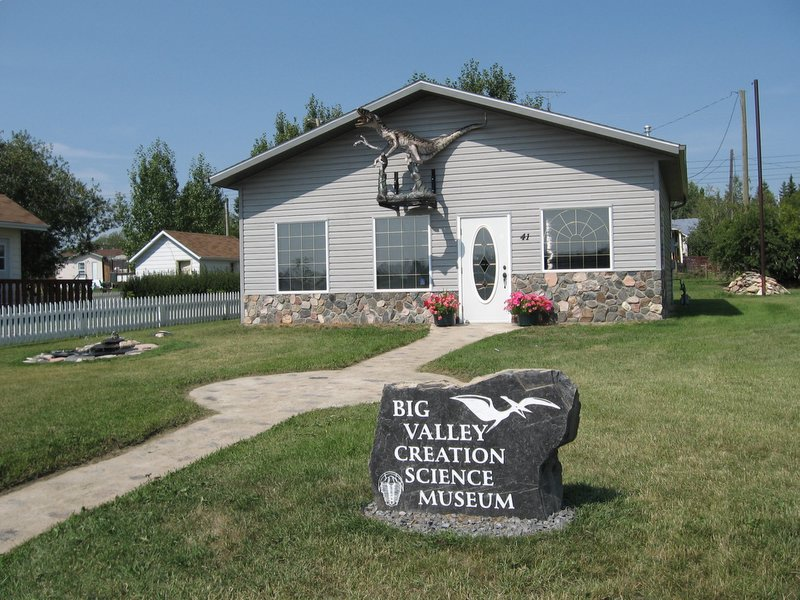
Big Valley Creation Science Museum in Big Valley, Alberta, Canada

- Conflict thesis
- Denialism
- Ken Ham
- Kent Hovind
- International Conference on Creationism
- Natural theology
- Omphalos hypothesis
- Adnan Oktar
- Jonathan Sarfati
- Scientific skepticism
- Vedic science

== Bibliography ==
- Alston, Jon P. (2003). The Scientific Case Against Scientific Creationism. Bloomington, IN: iUniverse. ISBN 978-0-595-29108-3. OCLC 53941528.
- Derry, Gregory Neil (2002) [Originally published 1999]. What Science Is and How It Works. Princeton, NJ: Princeton University Press. ISBN 978-0-691-09550-9. LCCN 99017186. OCLC 48834639.
- Feist, Gregory J. (2006). The Psychology of Science and the Origins of the Scientific Mind. New Haven, CT: Yale University Press. ISBN 978-0-300-11074-6. LCCN 2005018887. OCLC 123221724.
- Ham, Ken, ed. (2006). The New Answers Book 1: Over 25 Questions on Creation/Evolution and the Bible. Green Forest, AR: Master Books. ISBN 978-0-89051-509-9. LCCN 2006937546. OCLC 79475015.
- Humphreys, D. Russell (1994). Starlight and Time: Solving The Puzzle of Distant Starlight in a Young Universe. Foreword by Ken Ham. Green Forest, AR: Master Books. ISBN 978-0-89051-202-9. LCCN 94079857. OCLC 31897814.
- Larson, Edward J. (2003). Trial and Error: The American Controversy over Evolution (3rd ed.). New York: Oxford University Press. ISBN 978-0-19-515471-9. LCCN 2003269591. OCLC 52478644.
- Larson, Edward J. (2004). Evolution: The Remarkable History of a Scientific Theory. New York: Modern Library. ISBN 978-0-679-64288-6. LCCN 2003064888. OCLC 53483597.
- National Academy of Sciences (1999). Science and Creationism: A View from the National Academy of Sciences (2nd ed.). Washington, D.C.: National Academy Press. doi:10.17226/6024. ISBN 978-0-309-06406-4. LCCN 99006259. OCLC 43803228. PMID 25101403.
- National Academy of Sciences; Institute of Medicine (2008). Science, Evolution, and Creationism. Washington, D.C.: National Academy Press. ISBN 978-0-309-10586-6. LCCN 2007015904. OCLC 123539346.
- Numbers, Ronald L. (2002). "Creationism since 1859". In Ferngren, Gary B. (ed.). Science and Religion: A Historical Introduction. Baltimore, MD: Johns Hopkins University Press. ISBN 978-0-8018-7038-5. LCCN 2002016042. OCLC 48871135.
- Numbers, Ronald L. (2006). The Creationists: From Scientific Creationism to Intelligent Design (Expanded ed., 1st Harvard University Press pbk. ed.). Cambridge, MA: Harvard University Press. ISBN 978-0-674-02339-0. LCCN 2006043675. OCLC 69734583.
- Montagu, Ashley, ed. (1984). Science and Creationism. A Galaxy book. Oxford; New York: Oxford University Press. ISBN 978-0-19-503253-6. LCCN 82014173. OCLC 8689463.
- Moore, John Alexander (2002). From Genesis to Genetics: The Case of Evolution and Creationism. Berkeley, CA: University of California Press. ISBN 978-0-52-022441-4. LCCN 2001044419. OCLC 52996706.
- Okasha, Samir (2002). Philosophy of Science: A Very Short Introduction. Very Short Introductions. Vol. 67. Oxford; New York: Oxford University Press. ISBN 978-0-19-280283-5. LCCN 2002510456. OCLC 48932644.
- Petto, Andrew J.; Godfrey, Laurie R., eds. (2007) [Originally published 2007 as Scientists Confront Intelligent Design and Creationism]. Scientists Confront Creationism: Intelligent Design and Beyond. New York: W. W. Norton & Company. ISBN 978-0-393-33073-1. LCCN 2006039753. OCLC 173480577.
- Poling, Judson (2003). Do Science and the Bible Conflict?. Tough Questions. Foreword by Lee Strobel (Rev. ed.). Grand Rapids, MI: Zondervan. ISBN 978-0-310-24507-0. LCCN 2004555217. OCLC 64476407.
- Sarkar, Sahotra; Pfeifer, Jessica, eds. (2006). The Philosophy of Science: An Encyclopedia. Vol. 1. A-M. New York: Routledge. ISBN 978-0-415-93927-0. LCCN 2005044344. OCLC 60558736.
- Scott, Eugenie (2005) [Originally published 2004; Westport, CT: Greenwood Press]. Evolution Vs. Creationism: An Introduction. Foreword by Niles Eldredge (1st pbk. ed.). Berkeley, CA: University of California Press. ISBN 978-0-520-24650-8. LCCN 2005048649. OCLC 60420899.
- Scott, Eugenie C. (3 August 2009). Evolution Vs. Creationism: An Introduction (2nd ed.). Univ of California Press. pp. i–331. ISBN 978-0-520-26187-7.
- Shermer, Michael (2002). The Skeptic Encyclopedia of Pseudoscience. Santa Barbara, CA: ABC-CLIO. ISBN 978-1-57607-653-8. LCCN 2002009653. OCLC 192175643.
- Toumey, Christopher P. (1994). God's Own Scientists: Creationists in a Secular World. New Brunswick, NJ: Rutgers University Press. ISBN 978-0-8135-2043-8. LCCN 93024241. OCLC 42328874.
