= Flood geology =

Pseudoscientific attempt to reconcile geology with the Genesis flood narrative

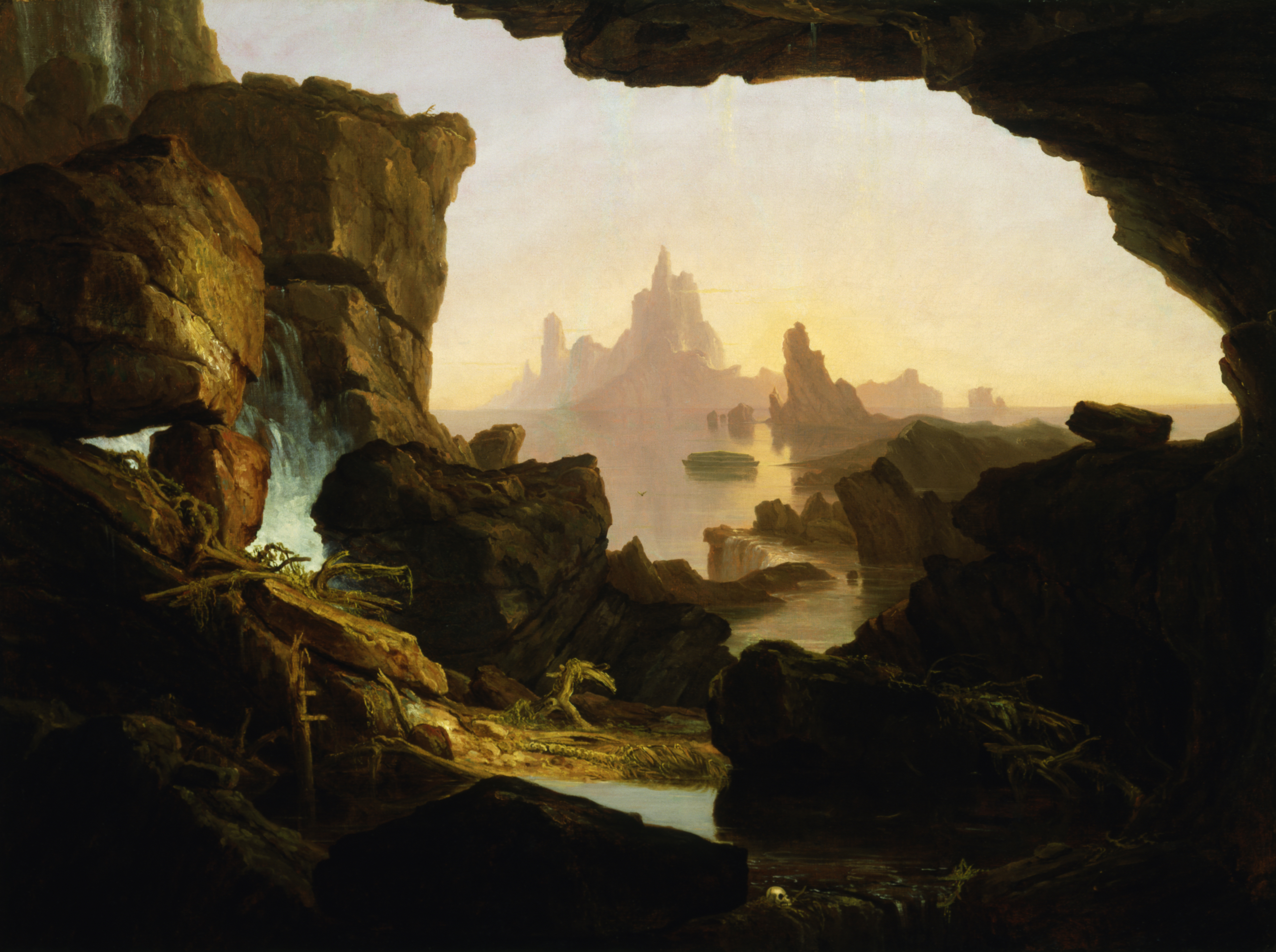
Thomas Cole – The Subsiding of the Waters of the Deluge – 1829, oil on canvas

Flood geology (also creation geology or diluvial geology) is a pseudoscientific attempt to interpret and reconcile geological features of the Earth in accordance with a literal belief in the Genesis flood narrative, the flood myth in the Hebrew Bible. In the early 19th century, diluvial geologists hypothesized that specific surface features provided evidence of a worldwide flood which had followed earlier geological eras; after further investigation they agreed that these features resulted from local floods or from glaciers. In the 20th century, young Earth creationists revived flood geology as an overarching concept in their opposition to evolution, assuming a recent six-day creation and cataclysmic geological changes during the biblical flood, and incorporating creationist explanations of the sequences of rock strata.

In the early stages of development of the science of geology, fossils were interpreted as evidence of past flooding. The "theories of the Earth" of the 17th century proposed mechanisms based on natural laws, within a timescale set by the Ussher chronology. As modern geology developed, geologists found evidence of an ancient Earth and evidence inconsistent with the notion that the Earth had developed in a series of cataclysms, like the Genesis flood. In early 19th-century Britain, "diluvialism" attributed landforms and surface features (such as beds of gravel and erratic boulders) to the destructive effects of this supposed global deluge, but by 1830 geologists increasingly found that the evidence supported only relatively local floods. So-called scriptural geologists attempted to give primacy to literal biblical explanations, but they lacked a background in geology and were marginalised by the scientific community, as well as having little influence in the churches.

Creationist flood geology was only supported by a minority of the 20th century anti-evolution movement, mainly in the Seventh-day Adventist Church, until the 1961 publication of The Genesis Flood by Morris and Whitcomb. Around 1970, proponents adopted the terms "scientific creationism" and creation science. Proponents of flood geology hold to a literal reading of Genesis 6–9 and view its passages as historically accurate; they use the Bible's internal chronology to place the Genesis flood and the story of Noah's Ark within the last 5,000 years.

Scientific analysis has refuted the key tenets of flood geology. Flood geology contradicts the scientific consensus in geology, stratigraphy, geophysics, physics, paleontology, biology, anthropology, and archaeology. Modern geology, its sub-disciplines and other scientific disciplines use the scientific method. In contrast, flood geology does not adhere to the scientific method, making it a pseudoscience.

== History of theories ==
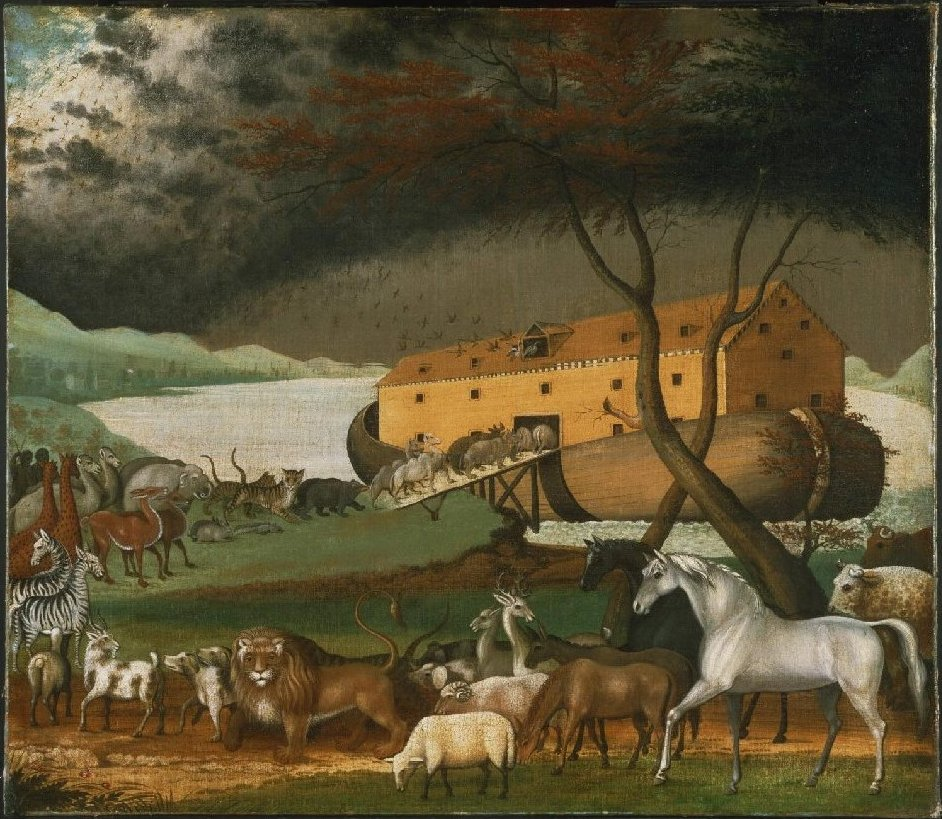
Animals boarding Noah's ark, 1846 painting by Edward Hicks.

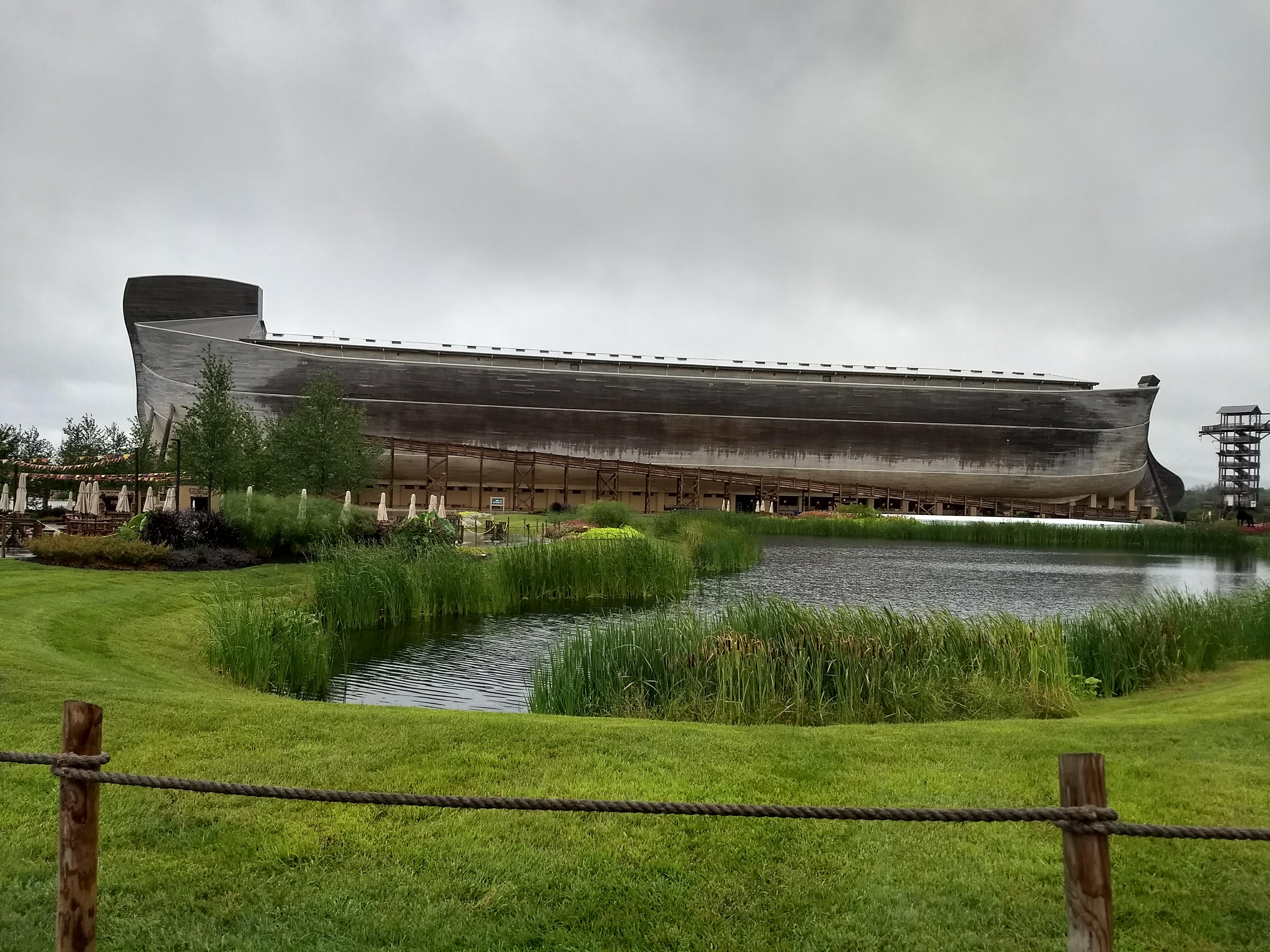
The Ark Encounter, Kentucky, a representation of Noah's ark, operated by Answers in Genesis, a young Earth creationist organization.

In pre-Christian times, fossils found on land were thought by Greek philosophers—including Xenophanes, Xanthus and Aristotle—to be evidence that the sea had in past ages covered the land. Their concept of vast time periods in an eternal cosmos was rejected by early Christian writers as incompatible with their belief in Creation by God. Among the church fathers, Tertullian spoke of fossils demonstrating that mountains had been overrun by water without explicitly saying when. Chrysostom and Augustine believed that fossils were the remains of animals that were killed and buried during the brief duration of the Genesis flood, and later Martin Luther viewed fossils as having resulted from the flood. The earliest documentation of the famous fossil fishes of the Sannine Formation comes from Eusebius, who cites them as being evidence of the Biblical flood.

Other scholars, including Avicenna, thought fossils were produced in the rock by "petrifying virtue" acting on "seeds" of plants and animals. In 1580, Bernard Palissy speculated that fossils had formed in lakes, and natural historians subsequently disputed the alternatives. Robert Hooke made empirical investigations and doubted that the numbers of fossil shells or depth of shell beds could have formed in the one year of Noah's flood. In 1616, Nicolas Steno showed how chemical processes changed organic remains into stone fossils. His fundamental principles of stratigraphy published in 1669 established that rock strata formed horizontally and were later broken and tilted, though he assumed these processes would occur within 6,000 years including a worldwide flood.

=== Theories of the Earth ===
In his influential Principles of Philosophy of 1644, René Descartes applied his mechanical physical laws to envisage swirling particles forming the Earth as a layered sphere. This natural philosophy was recast in biblical terms by the theologian Thomas Burnet, whose Sacred Theory of the Earth published in the 1680s proposed complex explanations based on natural laws, and explicitly rejected the simpler approach of invoking miracles as incompatible with the methodology of natural philosophy (the precursor to science). Burnet maintained that less than 6,000 years ago the Earth had emerged from chaos as a perfect sphere, with paradise on land over a watery abyss. This crust had dried out and cracked, and its collapse caused the biblical deluge, forming mountains as well as caverns where the water retreated. He made no mention of fossils but inspired other diluvial theories that did.

In 1695, John Woodward's An Essay Toward a Natural History of the Earth viewed the Genesis flood as dissolving rocks and soil into a thick slurry that caught up all living things, which, when the waters settled, formed strata according to the relative density of these materials, including fossils of the organisms. When it was pointed out that lower layers were often less dense and forces that shattered rock would destroy organic remains, he resorted to the explanation that a divine miracle had temporarily suspended gravity.

William Whiston's New Theory of the Earth of 1696 combined scripture with Newtonian physics to propose that the original chaos was the atmosphere of a comet with the days of creation each taking a year, and the Genesis flood had resulted from a second comet. His explanation of how the flood caused mountains and the fossil sequence was similar to Woodward's. Johann Jakob Scheuchzer wrote in support of Woodward's ideas in 1708, describing some fossil vertebrae as bones of sinners who had perished in the flood. A skeleton found in a quarry was described by him in 1726 as Homo diluvii testis, a giant human testifying to the flood. This was accepted for some time, but in 1812 it was shown to be a prehistoric salamander.

=== Beginnings of modern geology ===
The modern science of geology developed in the 18th century; the term "geology" was popularised by the Encyclopédie of 1751. Steno's categorisation of strata was expanded by several geologists, including Johann Gottlob Lehmann who believed that the oldest mountains had formed early in the Creation, and categorised as Flötz-Gebürge stratified mountains with few ore deposits but with thin layers containing fossils, overlain by a third category of superficial deposits. In his 1756 publication he identified 30 different layers in this category which he attributed to the action of the Genesis deluge, possibly including debris from the older mountains. Others including Giovanni Arduino attributed secondary strata to natural causes: Georg Christian Füchsel said that geologists had to take as standard the processes in which nature currently produces solids, "we know no other way", and only the most recent deposits could be attributed to a great flood.

Lehman's classification was developed by Abraham Gottlob Werner who thought that rock strata had been deposited from a primeval global ocean rather than by Noah's flood, a doctrine called Neptunism. The idea of a young Earth was further undermined in 1774 by Nicolas Desmarest, whose studies of a succession of extinct volcanoes in Europe showed layers which would have taken long ages to build up. The fact that these layers were still intact indicated that any later flood had been local rather than universal. Against Neptunism, James Hutton proposed an indefinitely old cycle of eroded rocks being deposited in the sea, consolidated and heaved up by volcanic forces into mountains which in turn eroded, all in natural processes which continue to operate.

=== Catastrophism and diluvialism ===
The first professional geological society, the Geological Society of London, was founded in 1807. By this time, geologists were convinced that an immense time had been needed to build up the huge thickness of rock strata visible in quarries and cliffs, implying extensive pre-human periods. Most accepted a basic time scale classifying rocks as primitive, transition, secondary, or tertiary. Several researchers independently found that strata could be identified by characteristic fossils: secondary strata in southern England were mapped by William Smith from 1799 to 1815.

==== Cuvier and Jameson ====
Georges Cuvier, working with Alexandre Brongniart, examined tertiary strata in the region around Paris. Cuvier found that fossils identified rock formations as alternating between marine and terrestrial deposits, indicating "repeated irruptions and retreats of the sea" which he identified with a long series of sudden catastrophes which had caused extinctions. In his 1812 Discours préliminaire to his Recherches sur les ossemens fossiles de quadrupeds put forward a synthesis of this research into the long prehistoric period, and a historical approach to the most recent catastrophe. His historical approach tested empirical claims in the biblical text of Genesis against other ancient writings to pick out the "real facts" from "interested fictions". In his assessment, Moses had written the account around 3,300 years ago, long after the events described. Cuvier only discussed the Genesis flood in general terms, as the most recent example of "an event of an [sic] universal catastrophe, occasioned by an irruption of the waters" not set "much further back than five or six thousand years ago". The historical texts could be loosely related to evidence such as overturned strata and "heaps of debris and rounded pebbles". An English translation was published in 1813 with a preface and notes by Robert Jameson, Regius Professor of Natural history at the University of Edinburgh. He began the preface with a sentence which ignored Cuvier's historical approach and instead deferred to revelation:

"Although the Mosaic account of the creation of the world is an inspired writing, and consequently rests on evidence wholly independent of human observation and experience, still it is interesting, and in many respects important, to know that it coincides with the various phenomena observable in the mineral kingdom."

This sentence was removed after the second edition, and Jameson's position changed as shown by his notes in successive editions, but it influenced British views of Cuvier's concept. In 1819, George Bellas Greenough, first president of The Geological Society, issued A Critical Examination of the First Principles of Geology stating that unless erratic boulders deposited hundreds of miles from their original sources had been moved by seas, rivers, or collapsing lakes, "the only remaining cause, to which these effects can be ascribed, is a Debacle or Deluge."

==== Buckland and the English school of geologists ====
Conservative geologists in Britain welcomed Cuvier's theory to replace Werner's Neptunism, and the Church of England clergyman William Buckland became the foremost proponent of flood geology as he sought to get the new science of geology accepted on the curriculum of the University of Oxford. In 1818, he was visited by Cuvier, and in his inaugural speech in 1819 as the first professor of geology at the university he defended the subject against allegations that it undermined religion. His speech, published as Vindiciae Geologicae; or, The Connexion of Geology with Religion Explained, equated the last of a long series of catastrophes with the Genesis flood, and said that "the grand fact of an universal deluge at no very remote period is proved on grounds so decisive and incontrovertible, that, had we never heard of such an event from Scripture, or any other, authority, Geology of itself must have called in the assistance of some such catastrophe, to explain the phenomena of diluvian action which are universally presented to us, and which are unintelligible without recourse to a deluge exerting its ravages at a period not more ancient than that announced in the Book of Genesis." The evidence he proposed included erratic boulders, extensive areas of gravel, and landforms which appeared to have been scoured by water.

This inaugural address influenced the geologists William Conybeare and William Phillips. In their 1822 book on Outlines of the Geology of England and Wales Conybeare referred to the same features in an introduction about the relationship between geology and religion, describing how a deluge causing "the last great geological change to which the surface of our planet appears to have been exposed" left behind the debris (which he named in Latin Diluvium) as evidence for "that great and universal catastrophe to which it seems most properly assignable". In 1823 Buckland published his detailed account of "Relics of the Flood", Reliquiae Diluvianae; or, Observations on the Organic Remains Contained in Caves, Fissures, and Diluvial Gravel and on Other Geological Phenomena Attesting the Action of an Universal Deluge, incorporating his research suggesting that animal fossils had been dragged into the Kirkdale Cave by hyenas then covered by a layer of red mud washed in by the deluge.

Buckland's views were supported by other Church of England clergymen naturalists: his Oxford colleague Charles Daubeny proposed in 1820 that the volcanoes of the Auvergne showed a sequence of lava flows from before and after the flood had cut valleys through the region. In an 1823 article "On the deluge", John Stevens Henslow, professor of mineralogy at the University of Cambridge, affirmed the concept and proposed that the flood had originated from a comet, but this was his only comment on the topic. Adam Sedgwick, Woodwardian Professor of Geology at Cambridge, presented two supportive papers in 1825, "On the origin of alluvial and diluvial deposits", and "On diluvial formations". At this time, most of what Sedgwick called "The English school of geologists" distinguished superficial deposits which were "diluvial", showing "great irregular masses of sand, loam, and coarse gravel, containing through its mass rounded blocks sometimes of enormous magnitude" and supposedly caused by "some great irregular inundation", from "alluvial" deposits of "comminuted gravel, silt, loam, and other materials" attributed to lesser events, the "propelling force" of rivers, or "successive partial inundations".

In America, Benjamin Silliman at Yale College spread the concept and in an 1833 essay dismissed the earlier idea that most stratified rocks had been formed in the flood, while arguing that surface features showed "wreck and ruin" attributable to "mighty floods and rushing torrents of water". He said that "we must charge to moving waters the undulating appearance of stratified sand and gravel, often observed in many places, and very conspicuously in the plain of New Haven, and in other regions of Connecticut and New England", while both "bowlder stones" and sandy deserts across the world could be attributed to "diluvial agency".

==== Criticisms and retractions: the downfall of diluvialism ====
Other naturalists were critical of diluvialism: Church of Scotland minister John Fleming published opposing arguments in a series of articles from 1823 onwards. He was critical of the assumption that fossils resembling modern tropical species had been swept north "by some violent means", which he regarded as absurd considering the "unbroken state" of fossil remains. For example, fossil mammoths demonstrated adaptation to the same northern climates now prevalent where they were found. He criticized Buckland's identification of red mud in the Kirkdale cave as diluvial, when nearly identical mud in other caves had been described as fluvial. While Cuvier had reconciled geology with a loose reading of the biblical text, Fleming argued that such a union was "indiscreet" and turned to a more literal view of Genesis:

But if the supposed impetuous torrent excavated valleys, and transported masses of rocks to a distance from their original repositories, then must the soil have been swept from off the earth to the destruction of the vegetable tribes. Moses does not record such an occurrence. On the contrary, in his history of the dove and the olive-leaf plucked off, he furnishes a proof that the flood was not so violent in its motions as to disturb the soil, nor to overturn the trees which it supported.

When Sedgwick visited Paris at the end of 1826 he found hostility to diluvialism: Alexander von Humboldt ridiculed it "beyond measure", and Louis-Constant Prévost "lectured against it". In the summer of 1827 Sedgwick and Roderick Murchison travelled to investigate the geology of the Scottish Highlands, where they found "so many indications of local diluvial operations" that Sedgwick began to change his mind about it being worldwide. When George Poulett Scrope published his investigations into the Auvergne in 1827, he did not use the term "diluvium". He was followed by Murchison and Charles Lyell whose account appeared in 1829. All three agreed that the valleys could well have been formed by rivers acting over a long time, and a deluge was not needed.

Lyell, formerly a pupil of Buckland, put strong arguments against diluvialism in the first volume of his Principles of Geology published in 1830, though suggesting the possibility of a deluge affecting a region such as the low-lying area around the Caspian Sea. Sedgwick responded to this book in his presidential address to the Geological Society in February 1830, agreeing that diluvial deposits had formed at differing times. At the society a year later, when retiring from the presidency, Sedgwick described his former belief that "vast masses of diluvial gravel" had been scattered worldwide in "one violent and transitory period" as "a most unwarranted conclusion", and therefore thought "it right, as one of my last acts before I quit this Chair, thus publicly to read my recantation." However, he remained convinced that a flood as described in Genesis was not excluded by geology.

One student had seen the gradual abandonment of diluvialism: Charles Darwin had attended Jameson's geology lectures in 1826 and at Cambridge became a close friend of Henslow before learning geology from Sedgwick in 1831. At the outset of the Beagle voyage Darwin was given a copy of Lyell's Principles of Geology and at the first landfall began his career as a geologist with investigations which supported Lyell's concept of slow uplift while also describing loose rocks and gravel as "part of the long disputed Diluvium". Debates continued over the part played by repeated exceptional catastrophes in geology, and in 1832 William Whewell dubbed this view catastrophism, while naming Lyell's insistence on explanations based on current processes uniformitarianism.

Buckland, too, gradually modified his views on the deluge. In 1832 a student noted Buckland's view on cause of diluvial gravel, "whether is Mosaic inundation or not, will not say". In a footnote to his Bridgewater Treatise of 1836, Buckland backed down from his former claim that the "violent inundation" identified in his Reliquiae Diluvianae was the Genesis flood:

it seems more probable, that the event in question, was the last of the many geological revolutions that have been produced by violent irruptions of water, rather than the comparatively tranquil inundation described in the Inspired Narrative. It has been justly argued, against the attempt to identity these two great historical and natural phenomena, that, as the rise and fall of the waters of the Mosaic deluge are described to have been gradual and of short duration, they would have produced comparatively little change on the surface of the country they overflowed.

For a while, Buckland had continued to insist that some geological layers were related to the Great Flood, but grew to accept the idea that they represented multiple inundations which occurred well before humans existed. In 1840 he made a field trip to Scotland with the Swiss geologist Louis Agassiz and became convinced that the "diluvial" features which he had attributed to the deluge had, in fact, been produced by ancient ice ages. Buckland became one of the foremost champions of Agassiz's theory of glaciations, and diluvialism went out of use in geology. Active geologists no longer posited sudden ancient catastrophes with unknown causes and instead increasingly explained phenomena by observable processes causing slow changes over great periods.

=== Scriptural geologists, and later commentary ===
Scriptural geologists were a heterogeneous group of writers in the early 19th century who claimed "the primacy of literalistic biblical exegesis" and a short young Earth time scale. Their views were marginalised and ignored by the scientific community of their time. They generally lacked any background in geology and had little influence even in church circles.

Many of them quoted obsolete geological writings. Among the most prominent, Granville Penn argued in 1822 that "mineral geology" rejected revelation, while true "Mosaical geology" showed that God had created primitive rock formations directly, in correspondence with the laws which God then made to produce subsequent effects. A first revolution on the third day of creation deepened the oceans so water rushed in, and in the deluge 1,656 years afterwards a second revolution sank land areas and raised the sea bed to cause a swirling flood which moved soil and fossil remains into stratified layers, after which God created new vegetation. As Genesis appeared to show that the rivers of Eden had survived this catastrophe, he argued that the verses concerned were an added "parenthesis" which should be disregarded. In 1837 George Fairholme expressed disappointment about disappearing belief in the deluge, and about Sedgwick and Buckland recanting diluvialism while putting forward his own New and Conclusive Physical Demonstrations which ignored geological findings to claim that strata had been deposited in a quick continuous process while still moist.

Geology was popularized by several authors. John Pye Smith's lectures published in 1840 reconciled an extended time frame with Genesis by the increasingly common gap theology or day-age theology, and said it was likely that the gravel and boulder formations were not diluvium but had taken long ages predating the creation of humans. He reaffirmed that the flood was historical as a local event, something which the 17th century theologians Edward Stillingfleet and Matthew Poole had already suggested on a purely biblical basis. Smith also denounced the "fanciful" writings of the scriptural geologists. Edward Hitchcock sought to ensure that geological findings could be corroborated by scripture and dismissed the scriptural geology of Penn and Fairholme as misrepresenting both scripture and the facts of geology. He noted the difficulty of equating a violent deluge with the more tranquil Genesis account. Hugh Miller supported similar points with considerable detail.

Little attention was paid to flood geology over the rest of the 19th century, its few supporters included the author Eleazar Lord in the 1850s and the Lutheran scholar Carl Friedrich Keil in 1860 and 1878. The visions of Ellen G. White published in 1864 formed Seventh-day Adventist Church views and influenced 20th century creationism.

== Creationist flood geology ==
The Seventh-day Adventist Church, led by Ellen G. White, took a six-day creation literally and believed that she received divine messages supplementing and supporting the Bible. Her visions of the flood and its aftermath, published in 1864, described a catastrophic deluge which reshaped the entire surface of the Earth, followed by a powerful wind which piled up new high mountains, burying the bodies of men and beasts. Buried forests became coal and oil, and where God later caused these to burn, they reacted with limestone and water to cause "earthquakes, volcanoes and fiery issues".

=== George McCready Price ===
White's visions prompted several books by one of her followers, George McCready Price, leading to the 20th-century revival of flood geology. After years selling White's books door-to-door, Price took a one-year teacher-training course and taught in several schools. When shown books on evolution and the fossil sequence which contradicted his beliefs, he found the answer in White's "revealing word pictures" which suggested how the fossils had been buried. He studied textbooks on geology and "almost tons of geological documents", finding "how the actual facts of the rocks and fossils, stripped of mere theories, splendidly refute this evolutionary theory of the invariable order of the fossils, which is the very backbone of the evolution doctrine". In 1902, he produced a manuscript proposing geology based on Genesis, in which the sequence of fossils resulted from the different responses of animals to the encroaching flood. He agreed with White on the origins of coal and oil and conjectured that mountain ranges (including the Alps and Himalayas) formed from layers deposited by the flood which had then been "folded and elevated to their present height by the great lateral pressure that accompanied its subsidence". He then found a report describing paraconformities and a paper on thrust faults. He concluded from these "providential discoveries" that it was impossible to prove the age or overall sequence of fossils and included these points in his self-published paperback of 1906, Illogical Geology: The Weakest Point in the Evolution Theory. His arguments continued this focus on disproving the sequence of strata, and he ultimately sold more than 15,000 copies of his 1923 college textbook The New Geology.

Price increasingly gained attention outside Adventist groups, and in the creation–evolution controversy other leading Christian fundamentalists praised his opposition to evolution – though none of them followed his young Earth arguments, retaining their belief in the gap or in the day-age interpretation of Genesis. Price corresponded with William Jennings Bryan and was invited to be a witness in the Scopes Trial of 1925 but declined as he was teaching in England and opposed to teaching Genesis in public schools as "it would be an infringement on the cardinal American principle of separation of church and state". Price returned from England in 1929 to rising popularity among fundamentalists as a scientific author. In the same year his former student Harold W. Clark self-published the short book Back to Creationism, which recommended Price's flood geology as the new "science of creationism", introducing the label "creationism" as a replacement for "anti-evolution" of "Christian Fundamentals".

In 1935, Price and Dudley Joseph Whitney (a rancher who had co-founded the Lindcove Community Bible Church) founded the Religion and Science Association (RSA). They aimed to resolve disagreements among fundamentalists with "a harmonious solution" which would convert them all to flood geology. Most of the organising group were Adventists; others included conservative Lutherans with similarly literalist beliefs. Bryon C. Nelson of the Norwegian Lutheran Church of America had included Price's geological views in a 1927 book, and in 1931 published The Deluge Story in Stone: A History of the Flood Theory of Geology, which described Price as the "one very outstanding advocate of the Flood" of the century. The first public RSA conference in March 1936 invited various fundamentalist views but opened up differences between the organisers on the antiquity of creation and on life before Adam. The RSA went defunct in 1937, and a dispute continued between Price and Nelson, who viewed creation as occurring over 100,000 years previously.

In 1938, Price, with a group of Adventists in Los Angeles, founded what became the Deluge Geology Society (DGS), with membership restricted to those believing that the creation week comprised "six literal days, and that the Deluge should be studied as the cause of the major geological changes since creation". Not all DGS adherents were Adventists; early members included the Independent Baptist Henry M. Morris and the Missouri Lutheran Walter E. Lammerts. The DGS undertook field work: in June 1941 their first Bulletin hailed the news that the Paluxy River dinosaur trackways in Texas appeared to include human footprints. Though Nelson had advised Price in 1939 that this was "absurd" and that the difficulty of human footprints forming during the turmoil of the deluge would "knock the Flood theory all to pieces", in 1943 the DGS began raising funds for "actual excavation" by a Footprint Research Committee of members including the consulting geologist Clifford L. Burdick. Initially they tried to keep their research secret from "unfriendly scientists". Then in 1945, to encourage backing, they announced giant human footprints, allegedly defeating "at a single stroke" the theory of evolution. The revelation that locals had carved the footprints, and an unsuccessful field trip that year, failed to dampen their hopes.

However, by then doctrinal arguments had riven the DGS. The most extreme dispute began in late 1938 after Harold W. Clark observed deep drilling in oil fields and had discussions with practical geologists which dispelled the belief that the fossil sequence was random, convincing him that the evidence of thrust faults was "almost incontrovertible". He wrote to Price, telling his teacher that the "rocks do lie in a much more definite sequence than we have ever allowed", and proposing that the fossil sequence was explained by ecological zones before the flood. Price reacted with fury, and despite Clark emphasising their shared belief in literal recent creation, the dispute continued. In 1946 Clark set out his views in a book, The New Diluvialism, which Price denounced as Theories of Satanic Origin.

In 1941, F. Alton Everest co-founded the American Scientific Affiliation (ASA) as a less confrontational forum for evangelical scientists. Some deluge geologists, including Lammerts and Price, urged close cooperation with the DGS, but Everest began to see their views as presenting an "insurmountable problem" for the ASA. In 1948, he requested J. Laurence Kulp, a geologist in fellowship with the Plymouth Brethren, to explore the issue. At the convention that year, Kulp examined hominid antiquity demonstrated by radiocarbon dating. At the 1949 convention a paper by Kulp was presented, giving a detailed critique of Deluge Geology, which he said had "grown and infiltrated the greater portion of fundamental Christianity in America primarily due to the absence of trained Christian geologists". Kulp demonstrated that "major propositions of the theory are contraindicated by established physical and chemical laws". He focused on "four basic errors" commonly made by flood geologists:

- saying that geology was the same as evolution
- assuming "that life has been on the earth only for a few thousand years, [and] therefore the flood must account for geological strata"
- misunderstanding "the physical and chemical conditions under which rocks are formed"
- ignoring recent discoveries such as radiometric dating that undermined their assumptions

Kulp accused Price of ignorance and deception, concluding that "this unscientific theory of flood geology has done and will do considerable harm to the strong propagation of the gospel among educated people". Price said nothing during the presentation and discussion. When invited to speak, he "said something very brief which missed what everyone was waiting for". Further publications made the ASA's opposition to flood geology clear.

=== Morris and Whitcomb ===
In 1942, Irwin A. Moon's Sermons from Science persuaded engineer Henry M. Morris of the importance of harmonising science and the Bible, and introduced him to the concepts of a vapor canopy causing the flood and its geological effects. About a year later Morris found Price's New Geology a "life-changing experience", and joined the DGS. His book That You Might Believe (1946) for college students included Price's flood geology.

Morris had joined the ASA in 1949, and in the summer of 1953 he made a presentation on "The Biblical Evidence for a Recent Creation and Universal Deluge" at their annual conference, held at Grace Theological Seminary. He impressed a graduate student there, John C. Whitcomb, Jr. who was teaching Old Testament and Hebrew. To Whitcomb's distress, the ASA members at the presentation "politely denounced" Morris.

In 1955, the ASA held a joint meeting with the Evangelical Theological Society (ETS) at the same campus, where theologian Bernard Ramm's The Christian View of Science and Scripture (1954) caused considerable discussion. This book dismissed flood geology as typifying the "ignoble tradition" of fundamentalism and stated that Price could not be taken seriously, as lacking the necessary competence, training and integrity. Instead, Ramm proposed what he called progressive creationism, in which the Genesis days functioned as pictorial images revealing a process that had taken place over millions of years. ASA scientists praised Ramm's views, but the ETS theologians proved unwilling to follow Ramm.

This encouraged Whitcomb to make his doctoral dissertation a response to Ramm and a defence of Price's position. He systematically asked evangelical professors of apologetics, archaeology and the Old Testament about creation and the flood and in October told Morris that Ramm's book had been sufficient incentive for him to devote his dissertation to the topic. In 1957 Whitcomb completed his 450-page dissertation, "The Genesis Flood", and he promptly began summarising it for a book. Moody Publishers responded positively and agreed with him that chapters on scientific aspects should be carefully checked or written by someone with a PhD in science, but Whitcomb's attempts to find someone with a doctorate in geology were unsuccessful. Morris gave helpful advice, expressing concern that sections were too closely based on Price and on Immanuel Velikovsky who were "both considered by scientists generally as crackpots". Morris produced an outline of his planned three chapters and in December 1957 agreed to co-author the book.

Morris sent on his draft for comment in early 1959. His intended 100 pages grew to almost 350, around twice the length of Whitcomb's eventual contribution. Recalling Morris's earlier concerns about how Price was viewed by scientists, Whitcomb suggested that "For many people, our position would be somewhat discredited" by multiple references to Price in the draft, including a section headed "Price and Seventh-Day Adventism". Morris agreed and even suggested avoiding the term "flood geology", but it proved too useful. After discussion, the co-authors minimised these references and removed any mention of Price's Adventist affiliation. By early 1960 they became impatient at delays when Moody Publishers expressed misgivings about the length and literal views of the book, and they went along with Rousas Rushdoony's recommendation of a small Philadelphia publisher.

==== The Genesis Flood (1961) ====
The Presbyterian and Reformed Publishing Company of Philadelphia published Whitcomb and Morris's The Genesis Flood in February 1961. The authors took as their premise biblical infallibility: "the basic argument of this volume is that the Scriptures are true". For Whitcomb, Genesis describes a worldwide flood which covered all the high mountains, Noah's Ark with a capacity equivalent to eight freight-trains, flood waters from a canopy and the deeps, and subsequent dispersal of animals from Mount Ararat to all the continents via land bridges. He disputed the views published by Ramm and Arthur Custance. Morris then confronted readers with the dilemma of whether to believe Scripture or to accept the interpretations of trained geologists, and instead of the latter proposed "a new scheme of historical geology"—true both to Scripture and to "God's work" revealed in nature. This was essentially Price's The New Geology of 1923 updated for the 1960s, though with few direct references to Price.

Like Price before him, Morris argued that most fossil-bearing strata had formed during a global deluge, disputing uniformitarianism, multiple ice ages, and the geologic column. He explained the apparent fossil sequence as the outcome of marine organisms dying in the slurry of sediments in early stages of the flood, of moving currents sorting objects by size and shape, and of the mobility of vertebrates (allowing them to initially escape the flood waters). He cited Walter E. Lammerts in support of Price's views about the thrust fault at Chief Mountain disproving the sequence.

The book went beyond Price in some areas. Morris extended the six-day creation from the Earth to the entire universe and wrote that death and decay had only begun with the fall of man, which had therefore introduced entropy and the second law of thermodynamics. He proposed that a vapor canopy, before providing water for the flood, created a mild, even climate and shielded the Earth from cosmic rays – so radiocarbon dating of antediluvian samples would not work. He cited the testimony of Clifford L. Burdick from the 1950s that some of the Glen Rose Formation dinosaur trackways near the Paluxy River in Dinosaur Valley State Park overlapped human footprints, but Burdick failed to confirm this, and the claim disappeared from the third edition of The Genesis Flood.

=== Creation Research Society ===
In a 1957 discussion with Whitcomb, Lammerts suggested an "informal association" to exchange ideas, and possibly research, on flood geology. Morris was unavailable to get things started, then c. 1961 William J. Tinkle got in touch, and they set about recruiting others. They had difficulty in finding supporters with scientific qualifications. The Creation Research Committee of ten they put together on 9 February 1962 had varying views on the age of the Earth, but all opposed evolution. They then succeeded in recruiting others into what became the Creation Research Society (CRS) in June 1963, which grew rapidly. Getting an agreed statement of belief was problematic; they affirmed that the Bible was "historically and scientifically true in the original autographs" so that "the account of origins in Genesis is a factual presentation of simple historical truths" and "The great flood described in Genesis, commonly referred to as the Noachian Flood, was an historic event worldwide in its extent and effect", but to Morris's disappointment they did not make flood geology mandatory. They lacked a qualified geologist, and Morris persuaded the group to appoint Burdick as their Earth scientist, overcoming initial concerns raised by Lammerts. The CRS grew rapidly, with an increasing proportion of the membership adhering to strict young Earth flood geology.

The resources of the CRS for its first decade went into publication of the CRS Quarterly and a project to publish a creationist school book. Since the 1920s most U.S. schools had not taught pupils about evolution, but the launch of Sputnik exposed apparent weaknesses of U.S. science education, and the Biological Sciences Curriculum Study produced textbooks in 1963 which included the topic. When the Texas Education Agency held a hearing in October 1964 about adopting these textbooks, creationist objectors were unable to name suitable creationist alternatives. Lammerts organised a CRS textbook committee which lined up a group of authors, with John N. Moore as senior editor bringing their contributions together into a suitable textbook.

=== Creation science ===
The teaching of evolution, reintroduced in 1963 by the Biological Sciences Curriculum Study textbooks, was prohibited by laws in some states. These bans were contested; the Epperson v. Arkansas case which began late in 1965 was decided in 1968 by the United States Supreme Court ruling that such laws violated the Establishment Clause of the First Amendment to the United States Constitution.

Some creationists thought a legal decision requiring religious neutrality in schools should shield their children from teachings hostile to their religion; Nell J. Segraves and Jean E. Sumrall (a friend of Lammerts who was also associated with the CRS and the Bible-Science Association) petitioned the California State Board of Education to require that school biology texts designate evolution as a theory. In 1966 Max Rafferty as California State Superintendent of Public Instruction suggested that they demand equal time for creation, as the Civil Rights Act of 1964 allowed teachers to mention religion as long as they did not promote specific doctrines. Their first attempt failed, but in 1969 controversy arose over a proposed Science Framework for California Schools. Anticipating success, they and others in the Bible-Science Association formed Creation Science, Inc., to produce textbooks. A compromise acceptable to Segraves, Sumrall and the Board was suggested by Vernon L. Grose, and the revised 1970 Framework included "While the Bible and other philosophical treatises also mention creation, science has independently postulated the various theories of creation. Therefore, creation in scientific terms is not a religious or philosophical belief." The result kept school texts free of creationism but downgraded evolution to mere speculative theory.

Creationists reacted to the California developments with a new confidence that they could introduce their ideas into schools by minimizing biblical references. Henry M. Morris declared "Creationism is on the way back, this time not primarily as a religious belief, but as an alternative scientific explanation of the world in which we live." In 1970 Creation Science, Inc., combined with a planned studies center at Christian Heritage College as the Creation-Science Research Center. Morris moved to San Diego to become director of the center and academic vice-president of the college. In the fall he presented a course at the college on "Scientific Creationism", the first time he is known to have used the term in public. (Two years later, the Creation-Science Research Center split with part becoming the Institute for Creation Research (ICR) led by Morris.)

CRS had found schoolbook publishers reluctant to take on their textbook, and eventually the Christian publishing company Zondervan brought out Biology: A Search for Order in Complexity in 1970. The 10,000 prints sold out within a year, and they produced 25,000 as the second impression, but hardly any public schools adopted the book. A preface by Morris claims that there were two philosophies of creation, "the doctrine of evolution and the doctrine of special creation", attempting to give both equal validity. The book mostly covers uncontroversial details of biology but asserts that these were correctly seen as "God's creation" or "divine creation", and presents biblical creation as the correct scientific view. A chapter on "Weaknesses of Geologic Evidence" disputes evolutionary theories while asserting a "fact that most fossil material was laid down by the flood in Noah's time". Another chapter disputes evolutionary theory.

In the CRS Quarterly for September 1971, Morris introduced the "two-model approach" asserting that evolution and creation were both equally scientific and equally religious, and soon afterwards he said they were "competing scientific hypotheses". For the third printing of Biology: A Search for Order in Complexity in 1974, the editor John N. Moore added a preface setting out this approach as "the two basic viewpoints of origins", the "evolution model" and the "creation model". When an Indiana school decided to use the book as their biology text, the Hendren v. Campbell district court case banned its use in public schools as infringing the Establishment Clause. Judge Michael T. Dugan, II, described it as "a text obviously designed to present only the view of Biblical Creationism in a favorable light", contravening the constitution by promotion of a specific sectarian religious view.

As a tactic to gain the same scientific status as evolution, flood geology proponents had effectively relabeled the Bible-based flood geology of George McCready Price as "creation science" or "scientific creationism" by the mid-1970s. At the CRS board meeting in spring 1972, members were told to start using "scientific creationism", a phrase used interchangeably with "creation science"; Morris explained that preferences differed, though neither was ideal as "one simple term" could not "identify such a complex and comprehensive subject." In the 1974 ICR handbook for high-school teachers titled Scientific Creationism, Morris uses the two-model approach to support his argument that creationism could "be taught without reference to the book of Genesis or to other religious literature or to religious doctrines", and in public schools only the "basic scientific creation model" should be taught, rather than biblical creationism which "would open the door to wide interpretations of Genesis" or to non-Christian cosmogonies. He did not deny having been influenced by the Bible. In his preface to the book dated July 1974, Morris as editor outlines how the "Public School Edition" of the book evaluates evidence from a "strictly scientific point of view" without "reference to the Bible or other religious literature", while the "General Edition" is "essentially identical" except for an additional chapter on "Creation according to Scripture" that "places the scientific evidence in its proper biblical and theological context."

The main ideas in creation science are: the belief in "creation ex nihilo" (Latin: out of nothing); the conviction that the Earth was created within the last 6,000 years; the belief that mankind and other life on Earth were created as distinct fixed "baraminological" kinds; and the idea that fossils found in geological strata were deposited during a cataclysmic flood which completely covered the entire Earth. As a result, creation science also challenges the commonly accepted geologic and astrophysical theories for the age and origins of the Earth and Universe, which creationists acknowledge are irreconcilable to the account in the Book of Genesis.

== Creationist arguments for a global flood ==
=== Fossils ===
The geologic column and the fossil record are used as major pieces of evidence in the modern scientific explanation of the development and evolution of life on Earth as well as a means to establish the age of Earth. Young Earth creationists such as Morris and Whitcomb in their 1961 book, The Genesis Flood, say that the age of the fossils depends on the amount of time credited to the geologic column, which they ascribe to be about one year. Some flood geologists dispute geology's assembled global geologic column since index fossils are used to link geographically isolated strata to other strata across the map. Fossils are often dated by their proximity to strata containing index fossils whose age has been determined by its location on the geologic column. Oard and others say that the identification of fossils as index fossils has been too error-prone for index fossils to be used reliably to make those correlations, or to date local strata using the assembled geologic scale.

Other creationists accept the existence of the geological column and believe that it indicates a sequence of events that might have occurred during the global flood. Institute for Creation Research creationists such as Andrew Snelling, Steven A. Austin and Kurt Wise take this approach, as does Creation Ministries International. They cite the Cambrian explosion—the appearance of abundant fossils in the upper Ediacaran (Vendian) period and lower Cambrian period—as the pre-flood/flood boundary, the presence in such sediments of fossils that do not occur later in the geological record as part of a pre-flood biota that perished and the absence of fossilized organisms that appear later (such as angiosperms and mammals) as a result of erosion of sediments deposited by the flood as waters receded off the land. Creationists say that fossilization can only take place when the organism is buried quickly to protect the remains from destruction by scavengers or decomposition. They say that the fossil record provides evidence of a single cataclysmic flood and not of a series of slow changes accumulating over millions of years.

Flood geologists have proposed numerous hypotheses to reconcile the sequence of fossils evident in the fossil column with the literal account of Noah's flood in the Bible. Whitcomb and Morris proposed three possible factors:

1. hydrological, whereby the relative buoyancies of the remains (based on the organisms' shapes and densities) determined the sequence in which their remains settled to the bottom of the flood-waters
2. ecological, suggesting organisms living at the ocean bottom succumbed first in the flood and those living at the highest altitudes last
3. anatomical/behavioral, the ordered sequence in the fossil column resulting from the very different responses to the rising waters between different kinds of organisms due to their diverse mobilities and original habitats. In a scenario put forth by Morris, the remains of marine life settled to the bottom first, followed by the slower-moving lowland reptiles, and culminating with humans, whose superior intelligence and ability to flee enabled them to reach higher elevations before the flood waters overcame them.

Some creationists believe that oil and coal deposits formed rapidly in sedimentary layers as volcanoes or flood waters flattened forests and buried the debris. They believe the vegetation decomposed rapidly into oil or coal due to the heat of the subterranean waters as they were unleashed from the Earth during the flood or by the high temperatures created as the remains were compressed by water and sediment.

Creationists continue to search for evidence in the natural world that they consider consistent with the above description, such as evidence of rapid formation. For example, there have been claims of raindrop marks and water ripples at layer boundaries, sometimes associated with the claimed fossilized footprints of men and dinosaurs walking together. Such footprint evidence has been debunked, and some have been shown to be fakes.

=== Widespread flood stories ===
Proponents of flood geology state that "native global flood stories are documented as history or legend in almost every region on earth". "These flood tales are frequently linked by common elements that parallel the biblical account including the warning of the coming flood, the construction of a boat in advance, the storage of animals, the inclusion of family, and the release of birds to determine if the water level had subsided." They suggest that "the overwhelming consistency among flood legends found in distant parts of the globe indicates they were derived from the same origin, but oral transcription has changed the details through time".

Anthropologist Patrick Nunn rejects this view and highlights the fact that much of the human population lives near water sources such as rivers and coasts, where unusually severe floods can be expected to occur occasionally and will be recorded in local mythology.

== Proposed mechanisms of flood geology ==
Price attempted to fit a great deal of Earth's geologic history into a model based on a few accounts from the Bible. Price's simple model was used by Whitcomb and Morris initially, but they did not build on the model in the 1960s and 1970s. However, a rough sketch of a creationist model could be constructed from creationist publications and debate material. Recent creationist efforts attempt to build complex models that incorporate as much scientific evidence as possible into the biblical narrative. Some scientific evidence used for these models was formerly rejected by creationists. These models attempt to explain continental movements in a short time frame, the order of the fossil record, and the Pleistocene ice age.

=== Runaway subduction ===
In the 1960s and 1970s a simple creationist model proposed that, "The Flood split the land mass into the present continents." Steve Austin and other creationists proposed a preliminary model of catastrophic plate tectonics (CPT) in 1994. Their work built on earlier papers by John Baumgardner and Russell Humphreys in 1986. Baumgardner proposed a model of mantle convection that allows for runaway subduction, and Humphrey associated mantle convection with rapid magnetic reversals in Earth history. Baumgardner's proposal holds that the rapid plunge of former oceanic plates into the mantle (caused by an unknown trigger mechanism) increased local mantle pressures to the point that its viscosity dropped several magnitudes according to known properties of mantle silicates. Once initiated, sinking plates caused the spread of low viscosity throughout the mantle, resulting in runaway mantle convection and catastrophic tectonic motion which dragged continents across the surface of the Earth. Once the former ocean plates (which are thought to be denser than the mantle) reached the bottom of the mantle, an equilibrium resulted. Pressures dropped, viscosity increased, runaway mantle convection stopped, leaving the surface of the Earth rearranged. Proponents point to subducted slabs in the mantle which are still relatively cool, which they regard as evidence that they have not been there for millions of years which would result in temperature equilibration.

Given that conventional plate tectonics accounts for much of the geomorphic features of continents and oceans, it is natural that creationists would seek to develop a high speed version of the same process. CPT explains many geological features, provides mechanisms for the biblical flood, and minimizes appeals to miracles. Some prominent creationists (Froede, Oard, Read) oppose CPT for various technical reasons. One main objection is that the model assumes the supercontinent Pangaea was intact at the initiation of the year-long flood. The CPT process then tore Pangaea apart creating the current configuration of the continents. But the breakup of Pangaea started early in the Mesozoic, meaning that CPT only accounts for part of the entire Phanerozoic geological record. CPT in this form only explains part of the geological column that flood geology normally explains. Modifying the CPT model to account for the entire Phanerozoic including multiple Wilson Cycles would complicate the model considerably.

Other objections of CPT include the amount of heat produced for the rapid plate movements, and the fact that the cooling of hot oceanic plates and the raising of continental plates would take a great deal of time and require multiple small scale catastrophes after the flood ended. The original CPT proposal of Austin and others in 1994 was admittedly preliminary, but the major issues have not been solved.

The vast majority of geologists regard the hypothesis of catastrophic plate tectonics as pseudoscience; they reject it in favor of the conventional geological theory of plate tectonics. It has been argued that the tremendous release of energy necessitated by such an event would boil off the Earth's oceans, making a global flood impossible. Not only does catastrophic plate tectonics lack any plausible geophysical mechanism by which its changes might occur, it also is contradicted by considerable geological evidence (which is in turn consistent with conventional plate tectonics), including:

- Many volcanic oceanic island chains, such as the Hawaiian Islands, yield evidence of the ocean floor having moved over volcanic hotspots. These islands have widely ranging ages (determined via both radiometric dating and relative erosion) that contradict the catastrophic tectonic hypothesis of rapid development and thus a similar age.
- Radiometric dating and sedimentation rates on the ocean floor likewise contradict the hypothesis that it all came into existence nearly contemporaneously.
- Catastrophic tectonics does not allow sufficient time for guyots to have their peak eroded away (leaving these seamounts' characteristic flat tops).
- Runaway subduction does not explain the kind of continental collision illustrated by that of the Indian and Eurasian Plates. (For further information see orogeny.)

Conventional plate tectonics accounts for the geological evidence already, including innumerable details that catastrophic plate tectonics cannot, such as why there is gold in California, silver in Nevada, salt flats in Utah, and coal in Pennsylvania, without requiring any extraordinary mechanisms to do so.

=== Vapor/water canopy ===
Isaac Newton Vail, a Quaker schoolteacher, in his 1912 work The Earth's Annular System, extrapolated from the nebular hypothesis what he called the annular system of Earth history, with the Earth being originally surrounded by rings resembling those of Saturn, or "canopies" of water vapor. Vail hypothesised that, one by one, these canopies collapsed on the Earth, resulting in fossils being buried in a "succession of stupendous cataclysms, separated by unknown periods of time". The Genesis flood was thought to have been caused by "the last remnant" of this vapor. Although this final flood was geologically significant, it was not held to account for as much of the fossil record as George McCready Price had asserted.

Vail's ideas about geology appeared in Charles Taze Russell's 1912 The Photo-Drama of Creation and subsequently in Joseph Franklin Rutherford's Creation of 1927 and later publications. The Seventh-day Adventist physicist Robert W. Woods also proposed a vapor canopy, before The Genesis Flood gave it prominence and repeated the theory's mention in 1961.

Although the vapor-canopy theory has fallen into disfavour among most creationists, Dillow in 1981 and Vardiman in 2003 attempted to defend the idea. Among its more vocal adherents, controversial young earth creationist Kent Hovind uses it as the basis for his eponymous "Hovind Theory". Jehovah's Witnesses propose as the water source of the deluge a "heavenly ocean" that was over the Earth from the second creative day until the flood.

== Modern geology ==
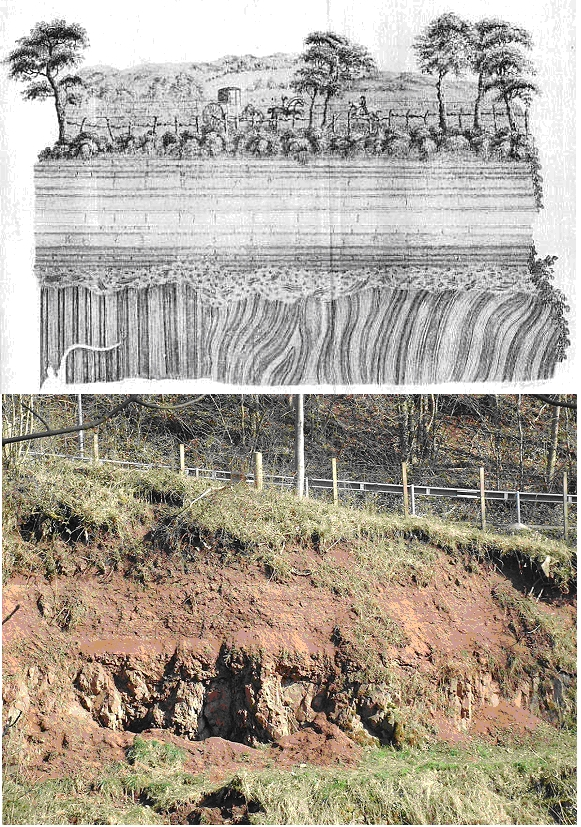
In the 18th century, finds such as Hutton's Unconformity showing layers tilted, eroded, and overlaid, demonstrated the "abyss of time" in the geologic time scale.

Modern geology, its sub-disciplines and other scientific disciplines use the scientific method to analyze the geology of the earth. The key tenets of flood geology are refuted by scientific analysis and do not have any standing in the scientific community. Modern geology relies on established principles, one of the most important of which is Charles Lyell's principle of uniformitarianism. In relation to geological forces it states that the shaping of the Earth has occurred by means of mostly slow-acting forces that can be seen in operation today. By applying these principles, geologists have determined that the Earth is approximately 4.54 billion years old. They study the lithosphere of the Earth to gain information on the history of the planet. Geologists divide Earth's history into eons, eras, periods, epochs, and faunal stages characterized by well-defined breaks in the fossil record (see Geologic time scale). In general, there is a lack of any evidence for any of the above effects proposed by flood geologists, and their claims of fossil layering are not taken seriously by scientists.

=== Geochronology ===
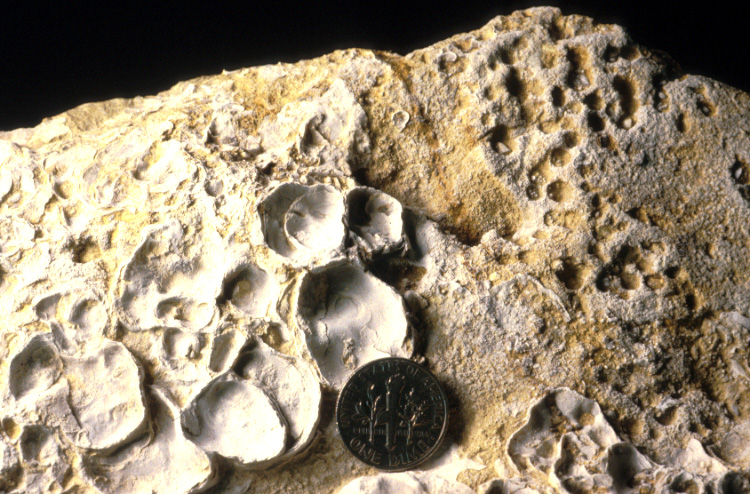
This Jurassic carbonate hardground shows generations of oysters and extensive bioerosion, features incompatible with the conditions and timing postulated for the Flood.

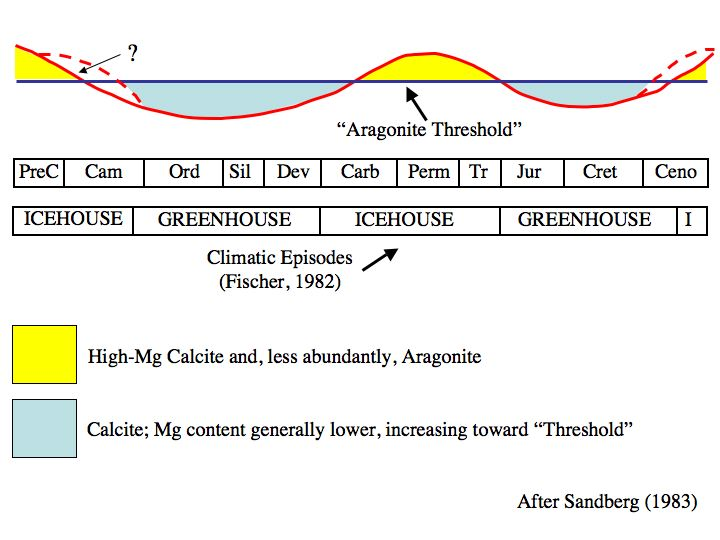
The alternation of calcite and aragonite seas through geologic time.

Geochronology is the science of determining the absolute age of rocks, fossils, and sediments by a variety of techniques. These methods indicate that the Earth as a whole is about 4.54 billion years old and that the strata that, according to creationist flood geology, were laid down during the biblical flood, were actually deposited gradually over many millions of years.

=== Paleontology ===
If the flood were responsible for fossilization, then all the animals now fossilized must have been living together on the Earth just before the flood. Based on estimates of the number of remains buried in the Karoo fossil formation in Africa, this would correspond to an abnormally high density of vertebrates worldwide, close to 2,100 per acre. Creationists argue that evidence for the geological column is fragmentary, and all the complex layers of chalk occurred in the approach to the 150th day of Noah's flood. However, the entire geologic column is found in several places and shows multiple features, including evidence of erosion and burrowing through older layers, which are inexplicable on a short timescale. Carbonate hardgrounds and the fossils associated with them show that the sediments include evidence of long hiatuses in deposition that are not consistent with flood dynamics or timing.

=== Geochemistry ===
Proponents of flood geology are unable to account for the alternation between calcite seas and aragonite seas through the Phanerozoic. The cyclical pattern of carbonate hardgrounds, calcitic and aragonitic ooids, and calcite-shelled fauna has apparently been controlled by seafloor spreading rates and the flushing of seawater through hydrothermal vents which changes its Mg/Ca ratio.

=== Sedimentary rock features ===
Phil Senter's 2011 article, "The Defeat of Flood Geology by Flood Geology", in the journal Reports of the National Center for Science Education, discusses "sedimentologic and other geologic features that Flood geologists have identified as evidence that particular strata cannot have been deposited during a time when the entire planet was under water...and distribution of strata that predate the existence of the Ararat mountain chain." These include continental basalts, terrestrial tracks of animals, and marine communities preserving multiple in-situ generations included in the rocks of most or all Phanerozoic periods, and the basalt even in the younger Precambrian rocks. Others, occurring in rocks of several geologic periods, include lake deposits and eolian (wind) deposits. Using their own words, flood geologists find evidence in every Paleozoic and Mesozoic period, and in every epoch of the Cenozoic period, indicating that a global flood could not have occurred during that interval.

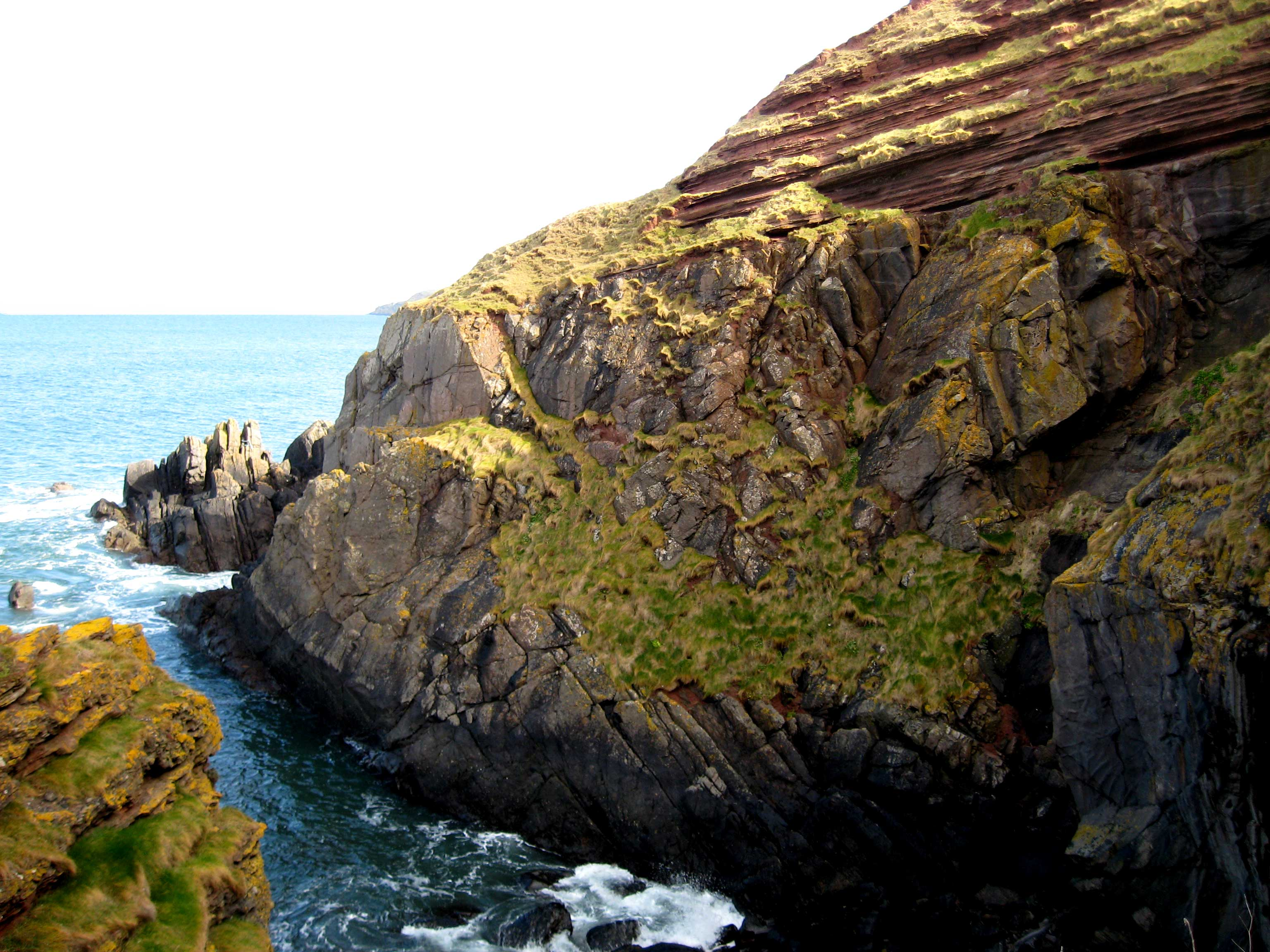
The angular unconformity found by James Hutton in 1788 at Siccar Point demonstrated the time taken for erosion of tilted rock and deposition of overlying layers.

The global flood cannot explain geological formations such as angular unconformities, where sedimentary rocks have been tilted and eroded then more sedimentary layers deposited on top, needing long periods of time for these processes. There is also the time needed for the erosion of valleys in sedimentary rock mountains. Furthermore, the flood should have produced large-scale effects spread throughout the entire world. Erosion should be evenly distributed, yet the levels of erosion in, for example, the Appalachians and the Rocky Mountains differ significantly.

=== Physics ===
The engineer Jane Albright notes several scientific failings of the canopy theory, reasoning from first principles in physics. Among these are that enough water to create a flood of even 5 centimetres (2.0 in) of rain would form a vapor blanket thick enough to make the Earth too hot for life, since water vapor is a greenhouse gas; the same blanket would have an optical depth sufficient to effectively obscure all incoming starlight.

== See also ==
- Baraminology
- Creation biology
- List of topics characterized as pseudoscience
- Polystrate fossil
- Pre-Adamite
- Searches for Noah's Ark
