= Talk Reason =

Website dedicated to opposing creationism and promoting evolution

Talk Reason is a website dedicated to opposing creationism and promoting evolution. Talk Reason provides a forum for the publication of papers against creationism and intelligent design. For example, the website hosts Nick Matzke's 2003 paper on the evolution of flagella that challenged the claims of intelligent design proponents that such structures are irreducibly complex, in which he concluded that "there are no major obstacles to gradual evolution of the flagellum."

== See also ==
- TalkOrigins Archive
