= The Genesis Flood =

1961 book by John C. Whitcomb and Henry M. Morris

- Cover of the paperback edition
- Authors: John C. Whitcomb; Henry M. Morris
- Language: English
- Subject: Genesis flood narrative
- Publisher: Presbyterian & Reformed Publishing
- Publication date: 1961
- Publication place: United States
- Media type: Print (Hardcover)
- ISBN: 0-87552-338-2
- OCLC: 9199761
- Dewey Decimal: 222.11
- LC Class: BS658 .W5

The Genesis Flood: The Biblical Record and its Scientific Implications is a 1961 book by young Earth creationists John C. Whitcomb and Henry M. Morris that, according to historian Ronald Numbers, elevated young Earth creationism "to a position of fundamentalist orthodoxy".

== Background ==
By the late nineteenth century, geologists, physicists and biologists agreed that the age of the Earth was well over 20 million years. Prior to the use of radiometric dating, scientific estimates before 1900 ranged between 20 million and 3 billion years old. Most Christians "readily conceded that the Bible allowed for an ancient earth and pre-Edenic life." With very few exceptions they accommodated the new geological theories either with day-age creationism, the belief that the six days of Genesis represented vast ages, or by separating the original creation from a later Edenic creation: the so-called gap theory. The primary promoter of "flood geology" during the early twentieth century was George McCready Price, but he had comparatively little influence among evangelicals because he was a Seventh-day Adventist, a church treated warily by many conservative Protestants.

== Origins ==
By the 1950s, most evangelical scientists scorned flood geology, and those who accepted the theory were increasingly marginalized within the American Scientific Affiliation (founded 1941), an evangelical organization that gradually shifted from strict creationism to progressive creationism and theistic evolution. In 1954, Bernard Ramm, an evangelical apologist and theologian closely associated with the ASA, published The Christian View of Science and Scripture, which attacked the notion that "biblical inspiration implied that the Bible was a reliable source of scientific data." Ramm ridiculed both flood geology and the gap theory, and one ASA member credited Ramm with providing a way for a majority of Christian biologists to accept evolution.

Ramm's book sparked a young Bible teacher and seminarian, John C. Whitcomb, Jr., to challenge what he considered its "absurdities". Whitcomb had earlier studied geology and paleontology at Princeton University, but by the 1950s, he was teaching the Bible at Grace Theological Seminary. At the 1953 ASA meeting, Whitcomb had been impressed by a presentation of Henry M. Morris—a hydraulic engineer with a PhD from the University of Minnesota—called "The Biblical Evidence for Recent Creation and Universal Deluge". Following publication of Ramm's book, Whitcomb decided to devote his Th.D. dissertation to defending flood geology.

Berated almost from the beginning of his project by influential evangelicals such as Edward John Carnell, the newly installed president of Fuller Theological Seminary, Whitcomb completed his dissertation in 1957 and began condensing it for publication. With no illusions about his scientific expertise, Whitcomb sought a collaborator who had a PhD in science. He could find no geologists who took Genesis seriously, and even teachers at evangelical schools at best expressed distaste for flood geology. Eventually, Henry Morris agreed to become Whitcomb's collaborator for the scientific portions of the book. Despite his heavy teaching load and administrative duties at Virginia Tech, where he had just become head of a large civil-engineering program, Morris made steady progress on his section of the book, eventually contributing more than twice as much material as Whitcomb.

As the manuscript neared completion, Moody Press, which had expressed initial interest, now hesitated. The proposed book was a long work that insisted on six literal days of creation and was certain to be criticized by segments of Moody's constituency. Whitcomb and Morris instead published with the smaller Presbyterian and Reformed Publishing Company, whose owner Charles H. Craig had long wanted to acquire a manuscript that supported catastrophism.

== Contents ==
After opening with the declaration that "the Bible is the infallible Word of God", Whitcomb's section provides biblical arguments for a universal flood as well as attempting to refute non-geological difficulties with the biblical account. Whitcomb specifically addresses the local flood theories of Bernard Ramm—who has far more entries in the index than anyone else. Whitcomb concludes his section of the work with a review of how geological theories had influenced Christian views of the Flood since the beginning of the nineteenth century and draws the "one vitally important lesson", that the biblical doctrine of the Flood cannot be harmonized with "uniformitarian theories".

Morris introduces his section on geology with the frank statement that Bible-believing Christians face "a serious dilemma" because contemporary geologists present "an almost unanimous verdict" against the biblical account of creation and the Flood. Nevertheless, Morris assures believers that "evidences of full divine inspiration of Scripture are far weightier than the evidences for any fact of science." Morris then argues that "fossil-bearing strata were apparently laid down in large measure during the Flood, with the apparent sequences attributed not to evolution but rather to hydrodynamic selectivity, ecologic habitats, and differential mobility and strength of the various creatures." He also dismisses the theory of "thrust faults", the mainstream geological theory by which "old" rocks were presumed to have come to rest on "young" rocks. Morris argues that commonly accepted geological theories do not truly depend on scientific data but are rather a "moral and emotional decision", in which evolutionists seek "intellectual justification for escape from personal responsibility to his Creator and escape from the 'way of the Cross' as the necessary and sufficient means of his personal redemption." Finally, in the longest chapter of the book, Morris addresses "problems in biblical geology", which include commonly used dating methods (such as carbon-14 measurements) as well as geological formations, such as coral reefs, petrified forests, and varves, all of which imply great age for the earth.

== Reception ==
Several dozen Christian magazines reviewed the book and generally praised its defense of the scriptural account of the Flood, although few seemed to understand that accepting Whitcomb and Morris meant rejecting the day-age and gap theories. Christianity Today, the most important evangelical magazine of the period, published a tepid review that did not address issues raised by the book but instead criticized the authors for using secondary sources and taking arguments out of context. The American Scientific Affiliation featured two hostile reviews, and in 1969, the ASA Journal published a highly critical commentary by J. R. van de Fliert, a Dutch Reformed geologist at the Free University of Amsterdam, who called Whitcomb and Morris "pseudo-scientific" pretenders. "To ensure that no readers missed his point," the journal "ran boldfaced sidebars by evangelical geologists applauding van de Fliert's bare-knuckled approach."

Outside fundamentalist circles The Genesis Flood created "hardly a ripple of recognition". Its release went unnoted by professional geology journals and periodicals covered by Book Review Digest. In a talk given to the large Houston Geological Society, Morris received a whimsical introduction by the president that fell well short of praise for his work. His call for questions at the conclusion of his talk produced none; one member said the audience was "too stunned to speak".

Scientists generally regard the book as a religious apologetic rather than a research document. The Geology Department of Baptist-affiliated Baylor University, in describing the known age of the earth as "4.51 to 4.55 billion years with a confidence of 1% or better", defined the key ingredient needed in methodology: "The defining characteristic of a scientific hypothesis is that it must be testable or falsifiable using reproducible observations. An idea that cannot be tested is not a scientific hypothesis. Scientific hypotheses are developed to fit data; data are not collected to fit or support hypotheses post facto." Joel Cracraft, "Systematics, Comparative Biology and the Case Against Creationism", in Laurie R. Godfrey, Scientists Confront Creationism (New York: Norton, 1983) attacked the Whitcomb and Morris theory of a quick dispersal of animals from the Ark: "During the last decade biogeographers have come to realize that when the postulated phylogenetic relationships of organisms—both plants and animals—are examined relative to their distributions, many highly congruent, nonrandom patterns emerge." The National Center for Science Education and other critics have shown The Genesis Flood misquotes scientific source material and takes remarks out of context. For example, in one instance, a source which read "the sea which vanished so many million years ago" was quoted as "the sea which vanished so many years ago." Geologist John G. Solum has criticized the work for being inaccurate. Solum noted "Whitcomb and Morris are mistaken about the nature of the rocks associated with thrust faults. Their claim about fossils is based on a Young Earth creationist misunderstanding of how rocks are dated relative to each other, and how the geologic column was constructed." In fact, Solum noted that Morris' explanation of relative dating was not merely "somewhat oversimplified" but "entirely incorrect".

Whitcomb and Morris "attributed the impasse between themselves and their critics to competing cosmologies" and argued that the term science could refer only to "present and reproducible phenomena", not to observations made about past events. Morris filled out his own cosmology a bit further in The Remarkable Birth of Planet Earth (1972), saying that the craters of the moon were probably caused by a cosmic battle between the forces of Satan and the armies of the archangel Michael. In defense of their work, Whitcomb and Morris noted that the founders of modern geological science were, like them, non-specialists: Charles Lyell (a lawyer), William Smith (a surveyor), James Hutton (a doctor and gentleman farmer), John Playfair (a mathematician), as well as a number of clergymen.

== Cultural importance ==
Historian of Science Michael D. Gordin has called The Genesis Flood "one of postwar America's most culturally significant works about the natural world. It was read by hundreds of thousands, spawned its own research institutes, and remains absolutely rejected by every mainstream biologist and geologist." The Genesis Flood also "became a best-seller in the Fundamentalist world and polarized Evangelical opinion." In 25 years, The Genesis Flood went through 29 printings and sold more than 200,000 copies. An old-earth creationist book, written specifically to challenge young-earth geological theories, called the late twentieth-century revival of interest in flood geology "astonishing and perplexing", especially "in the face of increasing geologic and astronomical evidence for the vast antiquity of the Earth and the universe." Again, in the words of a critic, Arthur McCalla, the growth in young-earth creationism occurred not because modern fundamentalists were more ignorant than in previous generations but because young-earth creationism "better defended a plain-sense reading of the inerrant Bible than did the old-Earth creationism of Ramm and the earlier Fundamentalists....Legions of Bible believers responded gratefully to Whitcomb and Morris because their system eliminated once and for all the need for interpretative contortions that twist and bend the words of the Bible in order to reconcile them with the findings of modern science."

Publication changed the lives of both authors. Morris especially was deluged with speaking invitations, and his notoriety became an embarrassment to Virginia Tech. In 1963, Morris became a founder of the Creation Research Society and then, in 1970, the Institute for Creation Research. He wrote many more books devoted to young-earth creationism.

During the late twentieth century, young-earth creationism sparked by The Genesis Flood was regularly featured on Christian radio and became a staple of the home-school movement. An International Conference on Creationism, held every fifth year in Pittsburgh, Pennsylvania, produces papers of "considerable scientific and mathematical sophistication", and the movement attracts younger scholars with PhDs in the sciences, including even a few in geology. Ken Ham, perhaps the best known young-earth creationist of the early twenty-first century, the founder of Answers in Genesis and the Creation Museum near Cincinnati, called Morris "one of my heroes of the faith. He is the man the Lord raised up as the father of the modern creationist movement. The famous book The Genesis Flood...was the book the Lord used to really launch the modern creationist movement around the world."

== See also ==
- Creation–evolution controversy
- Deluge (mythology)
- Noah's Ark
