= John C. Whitcomb =

American theologian (1924–2020)

- Born: John Clement Whitcomb Jr. June 22, 1924; Washington, D.C., U.S.
- Died: February 5, 2020 (aged 95); Indianapolis, Indiana, U.S.
- Education: Princeton University (BA); Grace Theological Seminary (BDiv)
- Occupation: Christian theologian
- Spouse: Norma

John Clement Whitcomb Jr. (June 22, 1924 – February 5, 2020) was an American theologian and young Earth creationist. Along with Henry M. Morris, he wrote The Genesis Flood, which influenced many conservative American Christians to adopt flood geology.

== Biography ==
Whitcomb was born in Washington, D.C., the son of Salome Josephine (Fuller) and John Clement Whitcomb, an army officer. He lived in northern China between the ages of 3 and 6, and later attended The McCallie School in Chattanooga, Tennessee. His education at Princeton University was interrupted in 1943 when he was drafted into the United States Army and served in Europe during World War II. While at Princeton, he converted to evangelical Christianity through the ministry of Donald B. Fullerton and the Princeton Christian Fellowship. He studied historical geology and paleontology for a year and graduated from Princeton in 1948 with honors in ancient and European history. Thereafter he enrolled at Grace Theological Seminary in Winona Lake, Indiana, where he earned a B.D. degree in 1951, and remained at the seminary, teaching Old Testament and Hebrew, along with Young Earth creationism. In 1953, the American Scientific Affiliation (ASA) held its annual conference at Grace. Whitcomb was especially impressed by Henry M. Morris' presentation defending Flood geology against day-age, ruin-restoration and pictorial-day views. The two found that they shared a belief in a literal six-day creation and a global Flood. Bernard Ramm's book The Christian View of Science and Scripture, which was published in 1954 and led to ASA rejection of Flood geology, impelled Whitcomb to devote his doctoral dissertation to rebutting Ramm and defending a literal interpretation of Genesis 6–9. Whitcomb polled Old Testament, archeology and apologetics scholars at evangelical schools, but although he found a wide range of viewpoints, he found little support for Flood geology. Whitcomb completed his dissertation on 'The Genesis Flood' in 1957 and successfully defended it at Grace Theological Seminary.

Whitcomb set about preparing his dissertation for publication, and sought somebody with a PhD in science to check or write the chapters on the scientific aspects of the Flood, but found himself unable to find any "Ph.D.s in geology today who take Genesis 6–9 seriously." His work was viewed with disfavour even by Douglas A. Block, reputedly the only scientist at Wheaton College who held to the idea of a global Flood, who stated:

It would seem that somewhere along the line there would have been a genuinely well-trained geologist who would have seen the implications of flood-geology and, if tenable, would have worked them into a reasonable system that was positive rather than negative in character.

Whitcomb accepted this criticism, being already aware that his inability to deal effectively with objections raised to Flood geology by ASA scientists was his "greatest weakness". He agreed to put off publication of the book to allow Morris to co-author chapters on scientific issues (including radioactivity, stratification and uniformitarianism).

The Genesis Flood, published by Whitcomb and Morris in 1961, "became a best-seller in the Fundamentalist world and polarized Evangelical opinion", though it was ignored by all university scientists and liberal Christians. It was followed by the launch of the Creation Research Society in 1963 and of Morris' Institute for Creation Research in 1972. Ken Ham, the founder of Answers in Genesis and the Creation Museum near Cincinnati, credited The Genesis Flood for "really launch[ing] the modern creationist movement around the world."

Whitcomb taught at Grace Theological Seminary's Old Testament and Christian Theology departments from 1951 to 1990. He was dismissed amid several theological controversies. Whitcomb attributes his dismissal to Dave Plaster prohibiting him attending a meeting of Conservative Grace Brethren Association (of which Whitcomb was a member) in Orrville, Ohio, in January 1990. Whitcomb went and upon his return was fired. He had shared concerns about theological drifts within the Seminary, especially in regards to Genesis 1.

In 1992, he was part of a split from the Fellowship of Grace Brethren Churches, the denominational home both of himself and Grace Seminary, forming the Conservative Grace Brethren Churches, International. This occurred after the Conservative Grace Brethren Association (CGBA) had been denied a request to be a recognized as a Cooperating Agency with the FGBC at National Conference. Whitcomb held no official title within the organization.

Whitcomb and his wife Norma resided in Indianapolis. He served as President Emeritus of Whitcomb Ministries, Inc., and as a speaker for Answers in Genesis. Whitcomb died at his home on February 5, 2020.
