= Henry M. Morris =

American young Earth creationist, Christian apologist and engineer

- Born: Henry Madison Morris; October 6, 1918; Dallas, Texas, U.S.
- Died: February 25, 2006 (aged 87); Santee, California, U.S.
- Education: Rice University (BS); University of Minnesota (MS, PhD)
- Occupation: President of the Institute for Creation Research
- Successor: John D. Morris
- Spouse: Mary Louise Beach (m. 1940)
- Children: Henry M. Morris III; Kathleen; John D. Morris; Andrew; Mary; Rebecca

Henry Madison Morris (October 6, 1918 – February 25, 2006) was an American young Earth creationist, Christian apologist and engineer. He was one of the founders of the Creation Research Society and the Institute for Creation Research. He is considered by many to be "the father of modern creation science". He coauthored The Genesis Flood with John C. Whitcomb in 1961.

Morris adhered to both biblical literalism and inerrancy. Accordingly, he opposed the billions-of-years time scales of evolution, the age of the Earth and the age of the Universe. Morris's influential approach, while adopted widely by the modern creationist movement, continues to be rejected by the mainstream scientific community, as well as by old Earth creationists, intelligent design advocates and theistic evolutionists.

== Early life, education and personal life ==
Morris was born in Dallas on October 6, 1918, grew up in Texas in the 1920s and 1930s, and graduated from Rice University with a bachelor's degree in civil engineering in 1939. He married Mary Louise on January 24, 1940, and they later had six children. They were married until Morris's death in 2006.

While Morris was religiously indifferent during his youth, shortly after his graduation from Rice in 1939, Morris became a Christian and accepted the Bible, from Genesis through Revelation, as the infallible and literal word of God.

== Career ==
After graduating in 1939, Morris served as a hydraulic engineer working with the International Boundary and Water Commission (1939–1942). He returned to Rice, teaching civil engineering from 1942 until 1946, where he also wrote a short book, That You Might Believe (1946). Attempting to answer the claims of evolution, he found the works of Harry Rimmer in his book, Theory of Evolution and the Facts of Science, "which more than any other work convinced him 'once and for all that evolution was false.'" From 1946 to 1951, he studied at the University of Minnesota, where he earned a master's degree in hydraulics (1948) and a PhD in hydraulic engineering (1950). In 1949, he joined the American Scientific Association as a correspondent in an attempt to change the views of the association. In 1951, he became a professor and chair of civil engineering at the University of Louisiana at Lafayette and served as the Acting Dean of Engineering in the fall of 1956. Morris then served as a professor of applied science at Southern Illinois University in 1957.

In 1959, Morris moved to the Virginia Polytechnic Institute and State University (Virginia Tech) to serve as Professor of Civil Engineering in the area of hydraulics and to serve as department chairman for civil engineering. There, Morris co-authored an advanced text on engineering hydraulics with J.M. Wiggert that was used in many universities, and under a decade of leadership, the department became one of the country's largest civil engineering departments. While Morris' religious views and writings were controversial among university biology and geology faculty, and in the broader debate, it has been reported that Morris "kept his own counsel on [them], unless... pressed", such that his university engineering colleagues respected Morris as "a good administrator" and his religious views "because they never influenced his [administration]".

In 1961, Morris coauthored The Genesis Flood with John C. Whitcomb, which some regard as the first significant attempt in the 20th century to offer a systematic scientific explanation for creationism. The book was very influential on modern creationist thought, and Stephen Jay Gould, a critic of Morris, called it "the founding document of the creationist movement."

In 1963, while at Virginia Tech, Morris and nine others founded the Creation Research Society, and Morris continued his creationist writing and speaking. Morris eventually left his faculty position at Virginia Tech in 1970 to focus on his work in creationism, after university interactions with a new engineering dean who directed Morris not to list creationist works alongside his engineering publications, viewing his non-engineering writings and increasing persona to be "too controversial." Morris is quoted as having said that these directions "seemed like... the handwriting on the wall that they didn't want me to stay..." and that "[Dean Willis] Worchester was happy... when I submitted my resignation".

In 1970, Morris co-founded the Christian Heritage College in Santee, California, which led to the formation of the Institute for Creation Research (ICR) in 1972. He served as President of Christian Heritage College from 1978 to 1980. Additionally, Morris served as President of ICR from 1970 to 1995, and as President Emeritus from 1996 to 2006. His son, John D. Morris, took over the presidency of ICR when his father retired.

On February 1, 2006, Morris suffered a minor stroke and was hospitalized. Morris was moved from the hospital to a rehabilitation facility near his son's home (and ICR) in Santee, California where he died.

== Reception ==
Morris has been called "the father of modern creation science", and "arguably the most influential creationist of the 20th century." Morris helped create the modern school of thought based on a belief in biblical inerrancy and a literal interpretation of Genesis. It is a system Morris called "Scientific Creationism" that opposes the mainstream scientific community regarding the history of the earth and the universe. Morris found an audience among preachers and homeschool teachers all over the US, where 46% of the public holds some form of creationist belief.

Morris was the primary source for much of the argumentation used by young Earth creationists when rejecting primary ideas in mainstream science, from the expanding universe to plate tectonics to biological evolution to genetics.

Morris's book, The Genesis Flood, coauthored by John C. Whitcomb, was very influential on modern creationist belief, and by the time of Morris's death, it was in its 44th printing and sold 250,000 English copies.

In 1995, Morris completed The Defenders Study Bible which includes his scientific & theological notes accompanying the King James Version. Just prior to his death in 2006 he completed a significant expansion of that work titled The New Defender's Study Bible. In May 2012 The New Defenders Study Bible was updated and released as The Henry Morris Study Bible.

In addition, during his lifetime, Morris published eleven articles on hydraulics in technical journals as well as hundreds of other articles and booklets on Biblical or creationist topics. From 1985 to 2002, he published Days of Praise, a monthly devotional booklet that contained a devotional Bible commentary for each day, which illustrated his spiritual focus.

Many in the scientific community have said that Morris' representation of evolution as a complete religious system is a straw man. In particular, Massimo Pigliucci criticized Morris' omission of material that interfered with his "mission" and "beliefs". Pigliucci also criticized Morris' interpretation of thermodynamics.

In Evolution & the Modern Christian (1967), Morris hoped to "open the minds and hearts of young people to the true Biblical cosmology." T.E. Fenton, Professor of Agronomy at Iowa State University, wrote "scientific value of the book is nil; the author selectively chooses the areas of science that he accepts and rejects other areas of accepted science". David Vogel, Professor of Biology at Creighton University, reviewed the book explaining "his theology is shallow; his exegesis is maddening; his science is wrong; and he tops it off by offending millions of Bible-believing Christians who also accept evolution".

Morris' book Scientific Creationism (1974 and 1984), according to Herman Kirkpatrick, "is not very convincing evidence to support the recent creation of the earth". Thomas Wheeler, Professor of biochemistry at University of Louisville, reviewed the second edition and concluded, "Scientific Creationism cannot be recommended for use in public school classes, or indeed anyone interested in learning science". Wheeler cited what he claimed was Morris' misunderstanding of science, appeals to religious prejudice, misrepresentation of scientific knowledge, omission of opposing science, double standards in evidence, "absurd conclusions," inappropriate and misidentified sources, attacks on scientists, using discredited arguments, and "silly calculations".

Morris' work with John C. Whitcomb, The Genesis Flood, has been criticized for taking quotes out of context and misquoting sources. For example, in one instance, a source which read "the sea which vanished so many million years ago" was quoted as "the sea which vanished so many years ago." Geologist John G. Solum has criticized the work for being inaccurate. Solum said "Whitcomb and Morris are mistaken about the nature of the rocks associated with thrust faults. Their claim about fossils is based on a Young Earth creationist misunderstanding of how rocks are dated relative to each other, and how the geologic column was constructed." Additionally, Solum said, "Morris' explanation of relative dating is not merely 'somewhat oversimplified' - it is entirely incorrect."

In The Long War Against God: The History and Impact of the Creation/Evolution Conflict (1989), Morris wrote that "the denial of God – rejecting the reality of supernatural creation and the creator's sovereign rule of the world – has always been the root cause of every human problem." Morris was criticized by Randy Moore, of University of Minnesota, for writing in the book that "evolutionism" is satanic and responsible for racism, abortion, and a decline in morality.

== Books ==
- That You Might Believe, self-published, 1946
- The Bible & Modern Science, Moody Press, Chicago, 1951
- (with co-author John C. Whitcomb) The Genesis Flood: The Biblical Record and Its Scientific Implications, Presbyterian & Reformed Publishing, Philadelphia, 1961. (ISBN 0-8010-6004-4)
- Applied Hydraulics in Engineering, Ronald Press, New York, 1963.
- The Twilight of Evolution, Baker Book House, 1963.
- Biblical Cosmology and Modern Science, Craig Press, Nutley, New Jersey, 1970. (ISBN 0-8010-5906-2)
- The Remarkable Birth of Planet Earth, Dimension Books, Minneapolis, 1972. (ISBN 0-87123-485-8)
- Many Infallible Proofs, Creation-Life Publishers, San Diego, 1974. (ISBN 0-89051-005-9)
- (ed) Scientific Creationism, Creation-Life Publishers, San Diego, 1974. (ISBN 0-89051-003-2)
- The Genesis Record, A scientific and devotional commentary on the book of beginnings, Baker Book House, Grand Rapids, 1976. (ISBN 0-8010-6004-4)
- and Martin E. Clark, The Bible Has The Answer, revised edition, Creation-Life Publishers, San Diego, 1976. (ISBN 0-89051-018-0)
- and Duane Gish (eds) The Battle for Creation, Creation-Life Publishers, San Diego, 1976.
- The Scientific Case for Creation, Creation-Life Publishers, San Diego, 1977. (ISBN 0-89051-037-7)
- Men of Science, Men of God: Great Scientists of the Past who Believed the Bible, Master Books, San Diego, 1982, revised 1988. (ISBN 0-89051-080-6)
- The Troubled Waters of Evolution, Creation-Life Publishers, San Diego, 1982. (ISBN 0-89051-087-3)
- and Gary E. Parker, What is Creation Science?, Creation-Life Publishers, San Diego, 1982. (ISBN 0-89051-081-4)
- and Donald H. Rohrer (eds) Creation, the cutting edge, Creation Life Publishers, San Diego, 1982.
- The Revelation Record: A Scientific and Devotional Commentary on the Prophetic Book of the End of Times, Tyndale House Publishers, U.S., 1983 .(ISBN 0842355111)
- History of Modern Creationism, Master Books, San Diego, 1984. (ISBN 0-89051-102-0)
- The Long War Against God: the history and impact of the creation/evolution conflict, Baker Book House, Grand Rapids, 1989. (ISBN 0-89051-291-4)
- That Their Words May Be Used Against Them, Master Books, Green Forest, 1997. (ISBN 0-89051-228-0)
- The Remarkable Record of Job, Master Books, Green Forest, 2000. (ISBN 0890512922)
- The Remarkable Wisdom of Solomon: Ancient Insights from the Song of Solomon, Proverbs, and Ecclesiastes Master Books, Green forest, 2001. (ISBN 0890513562)
- God and the Nations, Master Books, Green Forest, 2002. (ISBN 0-89051-389-9)
- The Biblical Basis for Modern Science, Master Books, Green Forest, 2002. (ISBN 0-89051-369-4)
- Biblical Creationism, Master Books, Green Forest, 2003. (ISBN 0-89051-293-0)
- The Defender's Study Bible, Thomas Nelson, Nashville, 2005. (ISBN 0529104458). Revised in 2006 as the New Defender's Study Bible. (ISBN 052912162X)
- The Henry Morris Study Bible, Master Books, Green Forest, 2012. (ISBN 0890516588)
