= Perspectives on Science and Christian Faith =

- Discipline: Science and Religion
- Language: English
- Edited by: James C. Peterson

Publication details
- History: 1949 as ASA Bulletin; 1950 to 1986 as Journal of the American Scientific Affiliation; 1987-present as current title
- Publisher: American Scientific Affiliation (United States)
- Frequency: quarterly

Standard abbreviations
- ISO 4: Perspect. Sci. Christ. Faith

Indexing
- ISSN: 0892-2675
- OCLC no.: 61313836

Links
- Journal homepage

Perspectives on Science and Christian Faith, subtitled Journal of the American Scientific Affiliation, is the academic publication of the American Scientific Affiliation.

== Background ==
The ASA's original constitution provided two goals for the ASA: "(1) to promote and encourage the study of the relationship between the facts of science and Holy Scriptures and (2) to promote the dissemination of the results of such studies." The establishment of the journal was seen as being in context of these goals. The journal is indexed in the ATLA Religion Serials Database.

Perspectives on Science and Christian Faith (PSCF) began publication in 1949 as the Journal of the American Scientific Affiliation (JASA). In its first year the journal was subtitled The American Scientific Affiliation Bulletin. In its first issue it announced its purpose as being:

It is intended primarily for the benefit of the A.S.A. members, and interested friends, and it is hoped that it will be instrumental in helping the organization achieve its primary purpose of witnessing to the truth of the Scriptures and elucidating the relationship of both the ideology and fruits of science thereto. Furthermore we confidently expect that in the publication of papers presented at the convention and others received from the membership at large, a real service will be rendered each of us in creating an enlarged appreciation and understanding of the Christian position in other fields of science than that of our own specialization. Also thru the A.S.A. Bulletin, we plan to give every interested member the benefit of a constructive criticism and Christian evaluation of papers presented and of reviews of books of great interest or strategic importance.

— Marion D. Barnes, Foreword, JASA 1 (January 1949): 1

From its beginning the journal included divergent views, and the editorial objectives of the journal, published in December 1950, were a clear indication of the ASA's non-doctrinal focus.

== Editors ==
The editors of the JASA/PSCF have been as follows:

- Marion Barnes (1949–1951), research chemist, Lion Oil Company
- Delbert N. Eggenberger (1951–1962), research physicist, Argonne National Laboratory
- David O. Moberg (1962–1964), Professor of Sociology, Bethel College, Minnesota
- Russell L. Mixter (1965–1968), Professor of Biology, Wheaton College, Illinois
- Richard H. Bube (1969–1983), Professor of Material Science, Stanford University
- Wilbur Bullock (1984–1989), Professor of Biology, University of New Hampshire
- John W. Haas, Jr. (1990–1999), Professor of Chemistry, Gordon College, Massachusetts
- Roman Miller (2000–2007), Professor of Biology, Eastern Mennonite University
- Ari Leegwater (2008–2011), Professor of Chemistry, Calvin College
- James C. Peterson (2012–), Charles and Helen Schumann Chair of Christian Ethics, Roanoke College and Roy A. Hope Professor of Theology and Ethics at McMaster Divinity College, McMaster University

== Debates on the creation–evolution controversy ==
The ASA journal published various views in the creation–evolution controversy. It carried Bernard Ramm's view that the theory of evolution had logical weakness, a 1949 article on "presuppositions in evolutionary thinking" by Young Earth creationist E. Y. Monsma, J. Laurence Kulp's 1950 indictment of "Deluge Geology", and Henry M. Morris's anonymous reply to it.

Kulp's paper, Deluge Geology execrated flood geology, which he stated had "grown and infiltrated the greater portion of fundamental Christianity in America primarily due to the absence of trained Christian geologists." He asserted that the "major propositions of the theory are contraindicated by established physical and geological laws" and focused on "four basic errors":

1. The "confusion that geology and evolution are synonomous [sic]"
2. Assuming "that life has been on the earth only for a few thousand years, [and] therefore the flood must account for geological strata"
3. Misunderstanding "the physical and chemical conditions under which rocks are formed"
4. Ignoring recent discoveries, such as radiometric dating, that undermined their assumptions

Kulp's conclusion was that a Christian was faced with two choices. Either: (1) the earth was created millions of years ago; or (2) God has apparently deceived humanity in providing data which does not support a 6,000- to 10,000-year-old Earth. He viewed "flood geology" as offering no third choice, that it was unscientific, ludicrous, and "has done and will do considerable harm to the strong propagation of the gospel among educated people". He also accused George McCready Price of ignorance and deception, including misrepresentation of geological data when defending flood geology. The paper failed to evoke the fireworks that Kulp and ASA president F. Alton Everest expected it to generate. In the opinion of at least one of the attendees at the annual convention where Monsma's and Kulp's papers were first presented, Monsma had lost the debate to Kulp, and Kulp was appointed that year to the executive council seat that Monsma had vacated. Kulp's influence was largely responsible for isolating flood geologists within the ASA, and Deluge Geology caused them considerable discomfort for years to come.

During the editorship of David O. Moberg (1962–1964), the ASA journal had a heavy emphasis on the creation–evolution controversy, with the subject being mentioned in the majority of issues, and the September 1963 issue being almost entirely devoted to it.

In 1964, JASA featured a pair of hostile reviews of John C. Whitcomb's and Henry M. Morris's The Genesis Flood (introduced by book-review editor Walter R. Hearn, who stated that they had been "edited extensively ... to tone them down a bit"), and in 1969 published a highly critical commentary by J. R. van der Fliert, a Dutch Reformed geologist at the Free University of Amsterdam, who called Whitcomb and Morris "pseudo-scientific" pretenders. "To ensure that no readers missed his point," the journal "ran boldfaced sidebars by evangelical geologists applauding van de Fliert's bare-knuckled approach."

In the 1970s, Richard H. Bube defended the viewpoint of theistic evolution in the journal.
