= Progressive creationism =

Belief that God created life gradually

Progressive creationism is the religious belief that God created new forms of life gradually over a period of hundreds of millions of years. As a form of old Earth creationism, it accepts mainstream geological and cosmological estimates for the age of the Earth, some tenets of biology such as microevolution as well as archaeology to make its case. In this view creation occurred in rapid bursts in which all "kinds" of plants and animals appear in stages lasting millions of years. The bursts are followed by periods of stasis or equilibrium to accommodate new arrivals. These bursts represent instances of God creating new types of organisms by divine intervention. As viewed from the archaeological record, progressive creationism holds that "species do not gradually appear by the steady transformation of its ancestors; [but] appear all at once and "fully formed."

The view rejects macroevolution, claiming it is biologically untenable and not supported by the fossil record, as well as rejects the concept of universal descent from a last universal common ancestor. Thus the evidence for macroevolution is claimed to be false, but microevolution is accepted as a genetic parameter designed by the Creator into the fabric of genetics to allow for environmental adaptations and survival. Generally, it is viewed by proponents as a middle ground between literal creationism and theistic evolution.

== Historical development ==
At the end of the 18th century, the French anatomist Georges Cuvier proposed that there had been a series of successive creations due to catastrophism. Cuvier believed that God destroyed previously created forms through regional catastrophes such as floods and afterwards repopulated the region with new forms. The French naturalist Alcide d'Orbigny held similar ideas; he linked different stages in the geologic time scale to separate creation events. At the time these ideas were not popular with strict Christians. In defense of the theory of successive creations, Marcel de Serres (1783–1862), a French geologist, suggested that new creations grow more and more perfect as the time goes on.

The idea that there had been a series of episodes of divine creation of new species with many thousands of years in between them, serving to prepare the world for the eventual arrival of humanity, was popular with Anglican geologists like William Buckland in the early 19th century; they proposed it as an explanation for the patterns of faunal succession in the fossil record that showed that the types of organisms that lived on the earth had changed over time. Buckland explained the idea in detail in his book Geology and Mineralogy considered with reference to Natural Theology (1836), which was one of the eight Bridgewater Treatises. Buckland presented this idea in part to counter pre-Darwin theories on the transmutation of species. The Scottish geologist and evangelical Christian Hugh Miller also argued for many separate creation events brought about by divine interventions, and explained his ideas in his book The testimony of the rocks; or, Geology in its bearings on the two theologies, natural and revealed in 1857.

Louis Agassiz, a Swiss-American naturalist, argued for separate divine creations. In his work he noted similarities of distribution of like species in different geological era; a phenomenon clearly not the result of migration. Agassiz questioned how fish of the same species live in lakes well separated with no joining waterway. He concluded they were created at both locations. According to Agassiz the intelligent adaptation of creatures to their environments testified to an intelligent plan. The conclusions of his studies led him to believe that whichever region each animal was found in, it was created there: "animals are naturally autochthones wherever they are found". After further research he later extended this idea to humans; he wrote that different races had been created separately. This became known as his theory of polygenism.

=== Revival ===
The American Scientific Affiliation (ASA) was founded in the early 1940s as an organization of orthodox Christian scientists. Although its original leadership favored Biblical literalism and it was intended to be anti-evolutionary, it rejected the creationist theories propounded by George McCready Price (young Earth creationism) and Harry Rimmer (gap creationism), and it was soon moving rapidly in the direction of theistic evolution, with some members "stopping off" on the less Modernist view that they called "progressive creationism." It was a view developed in the 1930s by Wheaton College graduate Russell L. Mixter. In 1954 Baptist theologian and Christian apologist Bernard Ramm (an associate of the inner circle of the ASA) wrote The Christian View of Science and Scripture, advocating progressive creationism which did away with the necessity for a young Earth, a global flood and the recent appearance of humans.

== Modern progressive creationism ==
In contrast to young Earth creationists, progressive creationists accept the geological column of the progressive appearance of plants and animals through time. To their viewpoint it accurately reflects the order in which God sequentially created kinds of organisms, starting with simple, single-celled organisms and progressing to complex multicellular organisms and the present day. They do not however accept the scientific consensus that these kinds evolved from each other, and believe that kinds are genetically limited, such that one cannot change into another.

Proponents of the progressive creation theory include astronomer and apologist Hugh Ross, whose organization, Reasons To Believe, accepts the scientifically determined age of the Earth but seeks to disprove Darwinian evolution.

== Interpretation of Genesis ==
Bernard Ramm adopted the view (developed by P. J. Wiseman) that "creation was "revealed [pictorially] in six days, (Note: A day is the period of time it takes for the Earth to complete one revolution on its access (approximately 24 hours). However, in the first creation story the Earth is not created until the third stage of the process. The Earth therefore did not exist for the first two stages, so the concept of a day did not exist for the first two stages.) not performed in six days", with God intervening periodically to create new "root-species" which then "radiated" out. This allowed geological formations such as coal to form naturally, so that they "might appear a natural product and not an artificial insertion in Nature", prior to the creation of mankind.

Progressive creationist and astrophysicist Hugh Ross adheres to a literal translation of Genesis 1 and 2 and holds to the principle that "Scripture interprets Scripture” to shed light on the context of the Creation account. Using this principle, progressive creationist Alan Hayward cites Hebrews 4, which discusses in the context of the creation story, a continued Seventh Day of creation. Ross ties this literal view of a lengthy seventh day to the Creation account in which he describes the Hebrew word "yom" to have multiple translation possibilities, ranging from 24 hours, year, time, age, or eternity/always. Ross contends that at the end of each Genesis "day", with the exception of the seventh "day", the phrase, “...and there was evening and there was morning,” is used to put a terminus to each event. The omission of that phrase on the Seventh Day, is in harmony with the literal translation of Hebrews 4’s continuing Seventh Day.

From a theological perspective, Robert Newman addresses a problem with this particular model of lengthy Genesis days, in that it puts physical plant and animal death before the fall of Man, which according to most Young Earth creationism is considered unscriptural. Old Earth creationists interpret death due to the fall of man as spiritual death specifically related to the context of man himself. Another problem with progressive creationism is due to the complicated nature of a model that arises from an attempt not to favor science over scripture and vice versa, potentially angering both schools of thought with this compromise. However, progressive creationists would argue that science and scripture are not conflicting, but rather supporting each other.

== See also ==
- Reasons to Believe
- Dating creation
- Great chain of being
- Yom

== Sources ==
- Cadbury, Deborah (2000). The Dinosaur Hunters: A True Story of Scientific Rivalry and the Discovery of the Prehistoric World. Fourth Estate, London. ISBN 1-85702-963-1.
- Hayward, Alan (March 1995). Creation and Evolution: Rethinking the Evidence from Science and the Bible. Bethany House Publishers. ISBN 1-55661-679-1.
- Jastrow, Robert (2000). God and the Astronomers: Second Edition. W. W. Norton & Company; 2 edition. ISBN 0-393-85006-4.
- Newman, Robert (September 1995). Scientific and Religious Aspects of the Origins Debate. The American Scientific Affiliation.
- Numbers, Ronald (November 30, 2006). The Creationists: From Scientific Creationism to Intelligent Design, Expanded Edition. Harvard University Press. p. 624 pages. ISBN 0-674-02339-0.
- Ross, Hugh (March 2004). A Matter of Days: Resolving a Creation Controversy. Navpress Publishing Group. ISBN 1-57683-375-5.
- Ross, Hugh (March 1994). Creation and Time: A Biblical and Scientific Perspective on the Creation-Date Controversy. Navpress Publishing Group. ISBN 0-89109-777-5.
