= Richard H. Bube =

Richard H. Bube (August 10, 1927 – June 9, 2018) was an American scientist.

== Academic career ==
Bube received his B.S. in physics from Brown University in 1946 and his M.A. (1948) and Ph.D. (1950) in physics from Princeton University.

He was a researcher at RCA Laboratories in Princeton, New Jersey, from 1948 to 1962. Thereafter he taught at Stanford University where he was an associate professor from 1962 to 1964, when he became professor of materials science and electrical engineering. He served as his department's chair from 1975 to 1986 and was an emeritus professor until his death on June 9, 2018.

For over twenty years he also conducted an undergraduate seminar at Stanford University on "Issues in Science and Christianity", until it was cancelled in 1988.

=== Professional affiliations ===
Bube is a member of:

- The American Physical Society (fellow)
- The American Association for the Advancement of Science (fellow)
- The American Society for Engineering Education
- The American Scientific Affiliation (fellow, member of executive council from 1964 to 1968, vice-president in 1967, president in 1968, editor of its journal from 1969 to 1983, emeritus fellow from 2009)

=== Defense of theistic evolution ===
In the 1970s, whilst he was editor of the Journal of the American Scientific Affiliation Bube defended the viewpoint of theistic evolution in that journal. One such article on this topic would receive in-journal peer-review by Baptist theologian Bernard L. Ramm, Canadian historian and Reformed scholar W. Stanford Reid, Fuller theologian Paul King Jewett, and Christian apologist Alvin Plantinga.

== Personal life ==
Bube was born in Providence, Rhode Island, to Edward Neser Bube and Ella Elvira (Baltteim) Bube. He married Betty Jane Meeker on October 9, 1948, and they had four children: Mark Timothy, Kenneth Paul, Sharon Elizabeth and Meryl Lee. His son Mark T. Bube is the General Secretary for Foreign Missions of the Orthodox Presbyterian Church. He married Mary Anne Harman September 9, 2000. He died on June 9, 2018, at the age of 90.

== Theology ==
His views on religion have been discussed by theologian Stanley J. Grenz.

== Bibliography ==
=== Engineering ===
- Electrons in solids : an introductory survey (1982, 1992), Richard H Bube
- Photoconductivity of solids (1960, 1978)
- Fundamentals of solar cells : photovoltaic solar energy conversion co-authored with Alan L Fahrenbruch(1983)
- Electronic properties of crystalline solids: an introduction to fundamentals (1974)
- Photoelectronic properties of semiconductors by Richard H Bube (1992)
- Photovoltaic materials (1998), ISBN 1-86094-065-X
- Photoinduced defects in semiconductors co-authored with David Redfield (1996)
- Annual review of materials science (1971-onward)

=== Religion and science works ===
- Putting it all Together: Seven Patterns for Relating Science and the Christian faith. University Press of America, 1995. ISBN 0-8191-9755-6.
- The Encounter between Christianity and Science (1968)
- The Human Quest: a New Look at Science and the Christian Faith (1971, 1976)
- To Every Man an Answer: a Systematic study of the Scriptural basis of Christian Doctrine (1955)
- One Whole Life. (self-published autobiography). 530 pages. 1995.

==== Book chapters ====
- "Man in the Context of Evolutionary Theory". Horizons of science : Christian scholars speak out. Ed. Carl F. H. Henry. Harper & Row, 1978. ISBN 0-06-063866-4.
- "Scientist as Believer". Expanding humanity's vision of God : new thoughts on science and religion. Ed. Robert L. Herrmann. Templeton Foundation Press, 2001. ISBN 1-890151-50-5.
- "Postscript: Final Reflections on the Dialogue". Summaries by Richard H. Bube and Phillip E. Johnson. Three Views on Creation and Evolution. pp. 249–266. Zondervan, 1999. ISBN 0-310-22017-3.

== See also ==
- God of the gaps
