= Slusher =

Slusher is a surname. It may refer to:

- Harold Slusher (born 1934), American physicist and young earth creationist
- Henry C. Slusher (1846-1923), private in the United States Army who was awarded the Medal of Honor
- Howard Slusher (1937-2022), American attorney and sports agent
- Jeron Slusher (1944-2016), Guatemalan footballer
- Juanita Slusher (1935–2005), stage name Candy Barr, American stripper, burlesque dancer, actress, and adult model
- Margaret F. Slusher (1879-1971), American businesswoman
- Mike Slusher (1948–2026), American basketball player
- Richart E. Slusher (born 1938), regents researcher and a principal research scientist
