= J. Laurence Kulp =

American chemist

John Laurence Kulp (February 11, 1921 – September 25, 2006) was a 20th-century geochemist. He led major studies on the effects of nuclear fallout and acid rain. He was a prominent advocate in American Scientific Affiliation circles in favor of an Old Earth and against the pseudoscience of flood geology. Kulp died on September 25, 2006, at the age of 85.

== Early life and education ==
Kulp was raised in Trenton, New Jersey and was brought up as a practically atheistic Episcopalian. As a young man he left the Episcopal Church and entered into fellowship with the Plymouth Brethren. He attended Drew University, then entered Wheaton College as a junior transfer student. He spent a year in graduate school at Ohio State University before moving to Princeton University, where he obtained a Ph.D. in physical chemistry in 1945.

== Scientific career ==
Kulp was professor of geochemistry at Columbia University between 1947 and 1965. He was also at various times vice president for research and development at Weyerhaeuser Company, director of research of the National Acid Precipitation Assessment Program, affiliate professor at the University of Washington, a consultant in environmental and energy affairs, and owner of Teledyne Isotopes.

His primary field was radiometric dating, which was transforming the field of geology in the 1950s. He was a pioneer in the field of Carbon 14 dating and in 1950, established the Carbon 14 research centre at Columbia University, the second in the United States.

During the 1950s he helped convince politicians that atomic bomb testing was a danger to health in regard to strontium-90 finding its way into the human food chain.

Kulp's research in radiometric dating included:

- Potassium-argon dating
- Rubidium-strontium dating
- Uranium-lead dating
- Carbon-14

In 1960, using the findings of radiometric dating, he published a geological time scale estimating the age of each geological era.

=== Strontium-90 nuclear fallout research ===
Kulp led a team, financed by the United States Atomic Energy Commission, that investigated the levels of strontium-90 finding itself into the human food chain because of nuclear weapons testing. Strontium-90 was chosen as it can easily find its way into the human body, through the food chain, by being first absorbed by vegetation and then directly or perhaps indirectly via, for example, cattle, into the human body. In February 1957, Kulp and his team reported that a human has typically about "0.12 micromicrocuries of strontium-90 for each gram of body calcium". (A micromicrocurie is a millionth of a millionth of a curie, what is now called a picocurie. 0.12 μμCi = 0.12 pCi = 0.44 mBq) The report estimated that by 1970, if no further atomic bomb testing was carried out, the average level would be about 1.3 picocurie (48 mBq) of strontium-90 for each gram of body calcium. The reason for the estimated rise without any further testing was attributed to the large length of time strontium-90, due to its properties, is able to stay in the stratosphere before gradually settling to earth. The report believed that what was considered a permissible level of 1.2 nanocuries (44 Bq) could be reached if nuclear bomb testing continued, especially in calcium deficient soils where vegetation would absorb strontium-90 as a suitable replacement for calcium. The report made the front page of the New York Times on February 8, 1957. In June of the same year the National Academy of Sciences stated that both genetic effects and strontium-90 were potential long term hazards of nuclear weapons testing.

=== Acid rain study ===
Kulp was the director of the National Acid Precipitation Assessment Program, which was established by the United States Congress in 1980. In 1987 it issued an interim report stating that the effects of acid rain on the ecosphere in the U.S.A. was not particularly great. This finding was controversial and the report was not well received, especially by environmentalists, and was considered by many to be politically incorrect. Most of the United States Congress also gave the report a hostile reception. Kulp resigned as director soon after, for personal reasons. Although the reports conclusions were subsequently endorsed by the scientific community, the final report was prevented from being released by the Environmental Protection Agency until Congress had passed new rules in regards to S0_{2} and N_{2}0 emissions in the fall of 1990. This final report, released under James Mahoney as director, differed little to the interim report.

== Criticism of flood geology ==
Kulp was one of the first American fundamentalists to be trained in geology. In 1945, he joined the American Scientific Affiliation (ASA), a fellowship of scientists who are also Christians, which provided him with a forum to debate the religious implications of geology, and to expose the errors and "pseudo-science" of the likes of George McCready Price and Harry Rimmer, which he was afraid would only bring derision to orthodox Christianity. In this, he was the most important scientist contributing to the split within conservative Protestantism into self-identifying evangelicals and fundamentalists.

Prior to his acting as an ad-hoc geological advisor to a Wheaton College alumna working towards a master's degree in physical anthropology at Columbia University Kulp, by his own admission, had "only read the various pseudo-scientific statements in Christian apologetical literature which blindly asserted that there was no evidence for man or manlike creatures earlier than 10,000 years ago." He was shocked to discover that "[a] careful study of the tremendous number of geological facts concerning the chronology of the Pleistocene period make[s] it apparent that such creatures have been on the earth probably hundreds of thousands of years." This discovery led Kulp to present a paper on the Antiquity of Hominoid Fossils to the Third Annual Convention of the ASA in 1948. The paper led to considerable discussion and disagreement, particularly with the convention's host, botanist and Young Earth creationist Edwin Y. Monsma (who would later become one of the co-founders of the Creation Research Society).

At the next ASA convention (whose attendees included Price himself), Kulp submitted a paper, Deluge Geology execrating flood geology, which he stated had "grown and infiltrated the greater portion of fundamental Christianity in America primarily due to the absence of trained Christian geologists." He asserted that the "major propositions of the theory are contraindicated by established physical and geological laws" and focused on "four basic errors":

1. The "confusion that geology and evolution are synonomous [sic]"
2. Assuming "that life has been on the earth only for a few thousand years, [and] therefore the flood must account for geological strata"
3. Misunderstanding "the physical and chemical conditions under which rocks are formed"
4. Ignoring recent discoveries, such as radiometric dating, that undermined their assumptions

Kulp's conclusion was that a Christian was faced with two choices. Either it was created millions of years ago or that God has apparently deceived humanity in providing data which does not support a 6000 to 10000 year old Earth. He viewed "flood geology" as offering no third choice, that it was unscientific, ludicrous and "has done and will do considerable harm to the strong propagation of the gospel among educated people". He also accused George McCready Price of ignorance and deception, including misrepresentation of geological data when defending flood geology. The paper failed to evoke the fireworks that Kulp and ASA president F. Alton Everest expected it to generate. Kulp submitted a second paper presented at that convention on radiocarbon dating, which argued that "preliminary work indicates Neanderthal remains (the youngest stratigraphically of the prehistoric fossil men) are at least older than 25,000 years."

Kulp's influence was largely responsible for isolating flood geologists within the ASA, and Deluge Geology caused them considerable discomfort for years to come.

Kulp approached geology with a critical eye but once convinced of the validity of a geological principle was not prepared to sacrifice well established scientific facts for the convenience of supporting the interpretation of the early Chapters of Genesis as given by mainstream "fundamentalists". He gained support from the Christian apologist Bernard Ramm who, in his support of Kulp in his criticism of flood geology, said "If uniformitarianism makes a scientific case for itself to a Christian scholar, that Christian scholar has every right to believe it, and if he is a man and not a coward he will believe it in spite of the intimidation that he is supposedly gone over into the camp of the enemy".

== See also ==
- History of creationism

== Notes ==
- Numbers, Ronald (November 30, 2006). The Creationists: From Scientific Creationism to Intelligent Design, Expanded Edition. Harvard University Press. pp. 624 pages. ISBN 0-674-02339-0.
