= Canadian Scientific & Christian Affiliation =

Canadian academic and religious fellowship

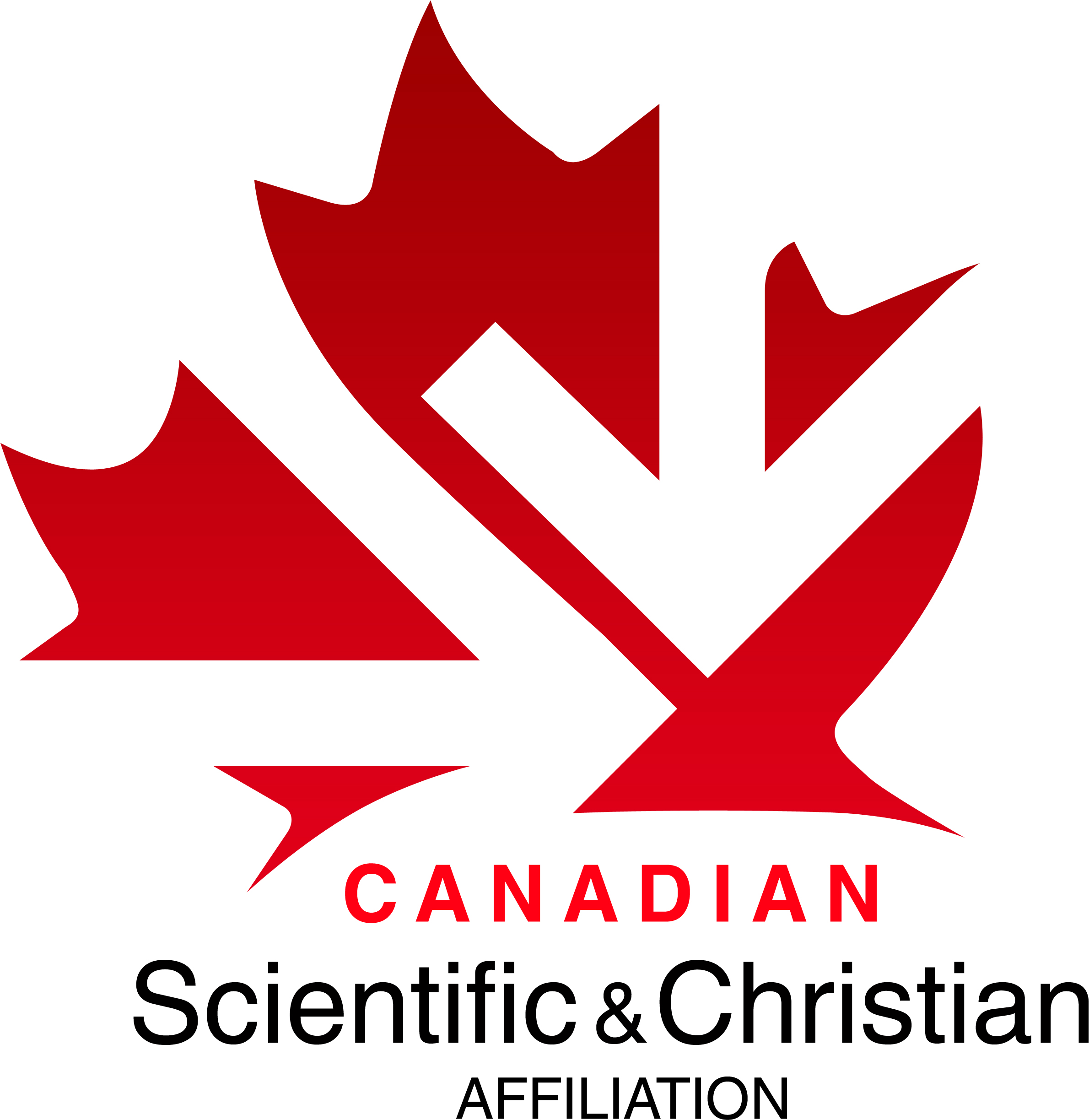
- Abbreviation: CSCA
- Formation: 1973
- Registration no.: 889087045 RR 0001
- Legal status: registered charity
- Purpose: Christian fellowship among scientists and those interested in science
- Location: Canada
- Executive Director: Arnold Sikkema
- President: Heather Prior
- Website: www.csca.ca

The Canadian Scientific & Christian Affiliation (CSCA) is a fellowship of scientists and those interested in science, who want to understand how science can best interact with the Christian tradition. The CSCA is the Canadian expression of the American Scientific Affiliation (ASA) which publishes a peer-reviewed academic journal, Perspectives on Science and Christian Faith, covering topics related to faith and science from a Christian viewpoint.

While the majority of CSCA members are scientists or students in science, the group also attracts theologians, science educators, and those interested in the history and philosophy of science. The CSCA encourages dialogue and broadens understanding of science/faith issues beyond the traditional discussion of origins.

== History ==
The American Scientific Affiliation (ASA) began in 1941, and from the early days of the organization, Canadians were members. While the idea of a Canadian organization arose in 1971, it gained momentum in 1972 when York University in Toronto, Ontario, hosted the 27th annual ASA meeting, the first such meeting to be held in Canada. Members who proposed the idea for the Canadian Scientific Affiliation, eventually named the Canadian Scientific & Christian Affiliation, did not want to separate from the ASA, but were convinced that having their own Canadian organization would increase Canadian membership. The ASA Executive Council agreed, and the CSCA was officially formed in 1973. All CSCA members are also ASA members.

In 2016, the group received a grant from the Templeton World Charity Foundation, Inc. to increase the number of local CSCA chapters. In that year, the CSCA had three chapters, but has now grown to eleven across Canada.

== Perspectives on Science and Christian Faith ==
The journal of the ASA is called Perspectives on Science and Christian Faith, subtitled Journal of the American Scientific Affiliation.

== Related organizations ==
The following organizations are related to the CSCA:

Sister organizations

- American Scientific Affiliation (ASA)
- Christians in Science (CiS)
- Institute for the Study of Christianity in an Age of Science and Technology (ISCAST)
