= Peter Stoner =

American mathematician (1888–1980)

- Born: June 16, 1888
- Died: March 21, 1980 (aged 91)

Peter Stoner (June 16, 1888 – March 21, 1980) was a Christian writer and Chairman of the departments of mathematics and astronomy at Pasadena City College until 1953; Chairman of the science division, Westmont College, 1953–57; Professor Emeritus of Science, Westmont College; and Professor Emeritus of Mathematics and Astronomy, Pasadena City College.

== Education ==
Stoner graduated from U. C. Berkely with a master's degree. His minor was in astronomy and his major was in mathematics. He wrote his doctoral thesis in astronomy, but upon learning his thesis must be written in mathematics, he refused the offer to make an exception for him.

== Career ==
Stoner is probably best known for his book Science Speaks, which discusses, among other things, Bible prophecies vis a vis probability estimates and calculations. The work is often cited in the field of Christian apologetics in regard to Bible prophecy. Stoner's book became widely known when it was mentioned by Josh McDowell in his 1972 book Evidence that Demands a Verdict (revised as New Evidence that Demands a Verdict).

== American Scientific Affiliation ==
Peter Stoner was a co-founder of the American Scientific Affiliation, a Christian organization that describes itself as "a fellowship of men and women in science and disciplines that relate to science who share a common fidelity to the Word of God and a commitment to integrity in the practice of science." The foreword to Stoner's Science Speaks includes a partial endorsement from this body (covering the book's scientific content and prophecy probability calculations, but not addressing issues of Biblical exegesis or historical accuracy): They considered it "...in general, to be dependable and accurate in regard to the scientific material presented" and the probability material presented in regard to prophecy. While the ASA includes members with a diverse range of attitudes towards science (theistic evolutionists, Intelligent Design advocates, old-Earth creationists and young-Earth creationists), Stoner himself was apparently an old-Earth creationist.

== Criticism ==
C. P. Swanson, reviewing Science Speaks in The Quarterly Review of Biology, wrote: "... the author has fallen into the commonest error of using only these facts which bolster his hypothesis, and of discarding or controverting those which do not. For example, his discussion of the theory of evolution is not only misleading; it displays an abysmal ignorance of recent evolutionary studies."

Various critics have taken issue with Stoner's interpretation of prophecy. Stoner's apologetic work did not receive critical attention until its inclusion in Josh McDowell's Evidence that Demands a Verdict and criticism of these claims tends to be addressed to McDowell rather than Stoner, with Stoner's name mentioned in passing. These criticisms against McDowell, Stoner and others include historical errors, claims regarding after-the-event authorship or tampering with biblical prophecies, and disputed meanings of certain biblical phrases.

Others who disagree with specific claims made by Stoner include fellow Christians and secular historians. For instance, while Stoner says of Ezekiel's prophecy of the permanent destruction of Tyre "If Ezekiel had looked at Tyre in his day and had made these seven predictions in human wisdom, these estimates mean that there would have been only one chance in 75,000,000 of their all coming true. They all came true in the minutest detail", others claim "the problem is that very little of this actually came to pass! In fact, it badly missed how history actually unfolded" and "The location of the city of Tyre is not in doubt, for it exists to this day on the same spot and is known as Sur." However, it could still be argued that the boundaries of the ancient mainland city may have fallen within areas of the modern city not rebuilt in the present day.
