= Anti-Evolution League of America =

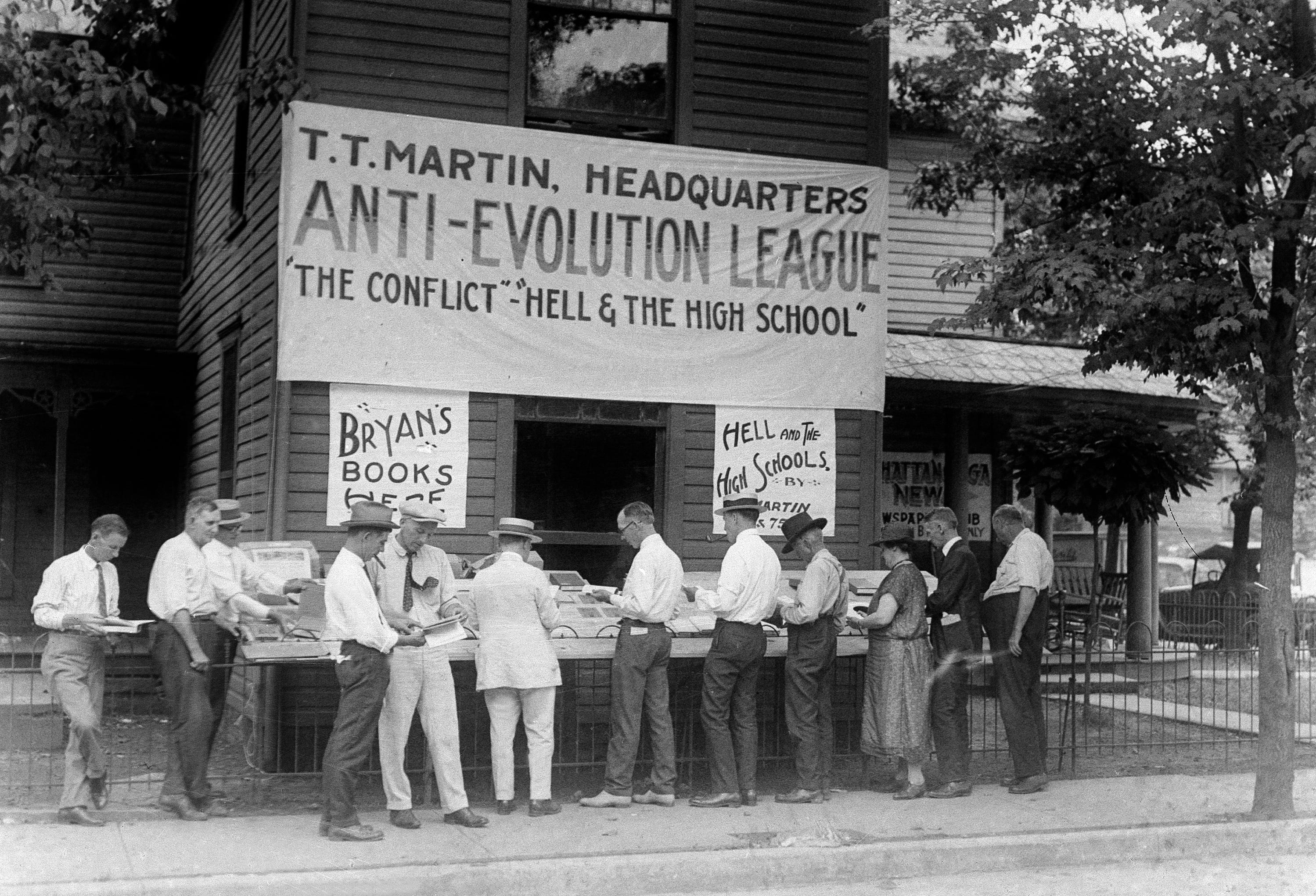
- Established: 1924
- Purpose: Lobby for anti-evolution legislation
- Key people: J. W. Porter; T. T. Martin; William Jennings Bryan; William Jennings Bryan Jr.
- Publication: The Conflict

The Anti-Evolution League of America was a biblical creationist organization created in 1924 a year after William Bell Riley founded the Anti-Evolution League of Minnesota. The first president was the Kentucky preacher Dr. J. W. Porter and T. T. Martin of Mississippi was field secretary and editor of the organization's official organ, The Conflict. The organization was behind anti-evolution legislation in Kentucky, where its efforts were supported by William Jennings Bryan. Following Bryan's death after the Scopes Trial, his son, William Jennings Bryan, Jr., briefly accepted the presidency of the league.

== See also ==
- World Christian Fundamentals Association
