= Hendren v. Campbell =

1977 court ruling

Hendren et al. v. Campbell et al. was a 1977 ruling by an Indiana state superior court that the young Earth creationist textbook could not be used in Indiana public schools. Jon Hendren, a ninth-grade student in the West Clark Community Schools, sued when the district picked Biology: A Search For Order In Complexity, published by the Creation Research Society and promoted through the Institute for Creation Research, as the sole biology textbook. The textbook was edited by creationists John N. Moore and Harold Schultz Slusher.

== Decision ==
The ruling declared: "The question is whether a text obviously designed to present only the view of Biblical Creationism in a favorable light is constitutionally acceptable in the public schools of Indiana. Two hundred years of constitutional government demand that the answer be no." Campbell was a forerunner to the federal decisions in McLean v. Arkansas and Edwards v. Aguillard. In Aguillard, the United States Supreme Court – using logic similar to that in Campbell – ruled that creation science was religiously motivated and could not be taught in public schools.
