= Harold Slusher =

American physicist and young earth creationist

- Born: 1934 (age 91–92)
- Occupations: Physicist, writer

Harold Schultz Slusher (born 1934) is an American physicist and young earth creationist.

== Biography ==
Slusher says he has an honorary D.Sc. from Indiana Christian University (ICU) and a Ph.D. in geophysics from Columbia Pacific University. However, according to Robert Schadewald, ICU is a Bible college with no more than two people in its graduate science department, and that CPU "exhibits several qualities of a degree mill".

He is assistant professor of physics at the University of Texas at El Paso and a member of the Institute for Creation Research. In 1986, Kendrick Frazier called him "perhaps the most outspoken critic of conventional science among the creationists".

Slusher believes the earth is 7000 to 10,000 years old. He is an opponent of Albert Einstein's theory of relativity.

== Biology: A Search for Order in Complexity ==
In 1974, Slusher co-edited the revised edition of the creationist textbook for students, Biology: A Search for Order in Complexity. The textbook was developed by the Creation Research Society and published by Zondervan. It was negatively reviewed as a pseudoscientific textbook that misrepresents biological evolution. A negative review in The Science Teacher noted that the "text grossly distorts the biological theory of evolution, so much that it is barely recognizable". The textbook does not define natural selection and falsely leads its readers to "believe that evolution is the result of chance mutation, when in fact it is the result of selection acting on genetic variability which arises ultimately by mutation. The picture of evolution presented in this book is wrong and flagrantly so". The review also noted that the textbook falsely defines evolution as the "ameba to man" theory where organisms of one "kind" change into another "kind". In 1977, an Indiana state superior court determined that the use of the textbook is unconstitutional (see Hendren v. Campbell).

== Selected publications ==
- Critique of Radiometric Dating (1973)
- Biology: A Search for Order in Complexity (with John N. Moore, 1974)
- Origin of the Universe (1980)
- Motion of Mercury's Perihelion (with Francisco Ramirez, 1984)
