= Minnesota Baptist Association =

Organization

The Minnesota Baptist Association, originally known as the Minnesota Baptist Convention, is an organization of independent fundamental Baptist churches in the state of Minnesota. The first meeting of the state convention of Minnesota Baptists was held August 28, 1859, in Winona. It was affiliated with the Northern Baptist Convention, but was taken over by fundamentalists under the leadership of William Bell Riley and subsequently withdrew from the Northern Baptists because of what they felt was an increasing trend toward modernism among the leadership, colleges, etc.
