= T. T. Martin =

American Christian evangelist

- Born: Thomas Theodore Martin; 1862; Smith County, Mississippi
- Died: May 23, 1939 (aged 76–77)

Philosophical work
- Institutions: Evangelism, antievolutionism

Thomas Theodore Martin (born 1862 in Smith County, Mississippi, died May 23, 1939), was a Christian evangelist who became one of the most important figures of the anti-evolution movement in the 1920s. When the Anti-Evolution League of Minnesota founded by the dynamic William Bell Riley of the First Baptist Church, Minneapolis, Minnesota, blossomed into the Anti-Evolution League of America in 1923, it was with the Kentucky preacher Dr. J. W. Porter as president and Martin as field secretary and editor of the organization's official organ, The Conflict. Martin would go on to become the secretary general of the North Carolina Anti-Evolution League and an official of the Bible Crusaders.

== Life ==
T. T. Martin was born to a Baptist minister and college professor; he graduated from Mississippi College in 1886 and took a teaching post before studying at the Southern Baptist Theological Seminary in Kentucky with a view to becoming a missionary. He was due to work in Brazil, but suffered food poisoning which weakened him for the rest of his life, and he stayed on in the US. Martin was married to Ivy Manning and they had five children. Martin preached until October 1938. He died on May 23, 1939, and was buried at Gloster, Mississippi. On his gravestone were carved the three Scripture texts which were the core of his ministry: John 3:16, Acts 16:31, and John 5:24.

== Work ==
Hell and the High Schools, first published in 1923, attacked the theory of evolution and the teaching of evolution in schools. In Martin's view this was "the greatest curse that ever fell upon this earth" and was an even greater sin than when the Germans poisoned wells and gave children poisoned candy during World War I. Martin wanted parents to pressure school boards and state legislatures to take steps to stop the teaching of evolution. The following is an example of Martin's prose style from the book:

"Reader, if you are not a parent, do you not yearn intensely to turn my child, your neighbor's child, your enemy's child, from spending Eternity in hell? Were even your enemy's house on fire, would you stand by in indifference and let his child be burned alive? Yet that child's being burned alive is as nothing when compared to that child's spending eternity in hell. You would go to the limit in helping to rescue the child from the burning building. Isn't saving a soul from spending eternity in hell ten million times more important than saving a human body from a burning building?"

Martin defended anti-evolution laws by claiming that they protected the individual liberty of religious students. Christ or Evolution was his other significant work, and is in a similar vein, constituting a colorful pair of diatribes if not outright polemics on the subject. Both works are representative of the anti-evolution rhetoric of this period. Granted, Martin was not as eloquent as William Jennings Bryan, but then there was nobody in the movement on the same level as the Great Commoner. However, Martin proved to be just as influential in getting anti-evolution laws passed, which is what makes these two works of great interest to those studying the history of the conflict between Christianity and science over evolution in this country and a struggle that is now almost a century old.

Martin showed up for the Scopes Trial in Dayton, Tennessee, where he rented a store as a book shop on which he hung a giant sign that promoted his books. Also sold were Martin's Evolution or Christ, Bryan's In His Image, Alfred W. McCann's God - or Gorilla?, and B.H. Shadduck's Puddle to Paradise. The best sellers proved to be Hell and the High Schools and the Adventist science educator George McCready Price's The Phantom of Organic Evolution. (Price was Bryan's main authority in his only speech in court during the trial.)

During the trial Martin preached on the streets of Dayton and once cornered H.L. Mencken in the Rhea County Courthouse and demanded to know if he was converted or not. During a second encounter outside of Robinson's Drug Store, Mencken told Martin there was a group of Bolsheviks arriving in town to murder Bryan, which sent the preacher to warn the local police that the ACLU was sending assassins to kill Bryan and other Christian notables. Martin gave his permit to preach from the public platform one evening to Charles Francis Potter, provided the Modernist minister did not preach about evolution. (Martin was under the same prohibition, and Potter made a plea for liberal education as the basis for values instead.)

In February 1926 a monkey bill similar to Tennessee's Butler Act was introduced in the Mississippi House of Representatives. Martin and others from Washburn's Bible Crusaders arrived to lobby the legislators, and the bill passed 76 to 32. In the state Senate there was a heated debate, during which an opponent proposed an amendment to make the penalty "death by burning at the stake, it being the spirit of this bill to restore the Spanish Inquisition." The amendment was defeated but the bill passed, 29 to 16, and was signed by Governor Henry L. Whitfield. While Chancellor Hume of the University of Mississippi argued the law would force the state's teachers to be intellectually dishonest, the superintendent of the high school in Meridian held a public bonfire to burn all pages about evolution from textbooks used in his school. An ACLU offer to assist any Mississippi taxpayer or member of the American Association of University Professors in a suit to challenge the case was ignored given what had happened in Dayton to John T. Scopes.

Because of Martin's efforts, and rhetoric in keeping with these anti-evolution writings, Mississippi became one of only two states to pass and keep anti-evolution legislation on the books in the wake of the Scopes Trial. The other state was Arkansas, and it was that state's law that was the basis of the U.S. Supreme Court's ruling that anti-evolution laws were unconstitutional in Epperson vs. Arkansas, 393 U.S. 97 (1968).

== Publications ==
Martin’s publications include;

- Hell and the High Schools
- Dear Heavenly Father: Letters from an Adopted Son
- Can we Know?
- Heaven, Hell, and other Sermons
- God’s Plan for Mankind
- God’s Plan With Men
- The New Testament Church
