= Alan Hayward =

British engineer and physicist

Alan Hayward (1923–2008) was a British engineer and physicist who was also active as an old-earth Creationist writer, and Christadelphian.

Hayward's primary field of research was fluid density and flowmeters, writing a textbook on the subject, and presenting to the Institute of Physics in 1981.

As a Christadelphian lay preacher Hayward had commenced writing on general religious topics for the Christadelphian Auxiliary Lecturing Society during the early 1970s. In particular his booklet on the characteristic (Socinian) belief of Christadelphians against the personal pre-existence of Christ remains that church's most widely circulated publication on that topic. Other publications included The Real Devil against belief in supernatural evil.

As a Christian, and a scientist, though not a biologist, he was soon involved in the subject of creation. In New Scientist (11 March 1992 issue) Hayward is cited speaking of "the quiet majority of Bible-believing creationists" who accept the "evidence of physics and geology that the Universe and our planet are billions of years old".

Despite being a nontrinitarian, Hayward's moderate old-earth creationist stand led to him being invited to write for mainstream publishers Thomas Nelson. He published three books: God is (1980) God's truth (1983) – a work dealing with textual defence of the Bible, and Creation and Evolution for SPCK (1985), which was widely cited and was re-published in America by Bethany House, Minneapolis (1995). Hayward's old-earth views were not welcomed by young earth or flood geology creationists, and his nontrinitarian views were often pointed out in criticism. His three main books have since been reprinted in India. God is was translated into German and Bengali, and God's Truth into Chinese.
