= F. Alton Everest =

F. Alton Everest (1909–2005) was an American acoustical engineer, a cofounder of the American Scientific Affiliation, and its first president.

== Academic and acoustic research career ==
He held electrical engineering degrees from Oregon State and Stanford University, where he conducted his early work with such prominent engineers as Lee DeForest (inventor of the triode vacuum tube) and Hewlett Packard founders William Hewlett and David Packard, then taught at Oregon State College at Corvallis from 1936, specialising in radio and television.

During World War II he headed a National Defense Research Committee underwater sound research team.

His book Master Handbook of Acoustics was described by Stereophile magazine as "the best-selling book on the subject of acoustics for more than 20 years."

After his work for the Moody Institute of Science, Everest worked as an acoustical consultant during the 1970s and 1980s.

== Moody Institute of Science ==
After the war (from 1945 to 1971), he became the director of production for the Moody Institute of Science (MIS), a Christian evangelical ministry producing science films, described by American Cinematographer as "the biggest little studio in the world" in the 1960s.

He published two books affiliated with the MIS: Dust or Destiny (Moody Press, 1949) and Hidden Treasures (Moody Press, 1951).

== American Scientific Affiliation ==
Everest grew up a conservative Baptist, reading the works of Harry Rimmer and George McCready Price (although favouring physician Arthur I. Brown as an influence on the relationship between science and religion).

In 1941 he attended a meeting of five evangelical scientists, convened by Moody Bible Institute president William H. Houghton, in Chicago, Illinois, which led to the founding of the American Scientific Affiliation, of which he became the organizational leader and president.

Everest led the ASA through its first critical decision, that of how to relate to the pre-existing Deluge Geology Society (DGS). Everest was enthusiastic about the DGS's ability to draw "large crowds of non-scientific folk", its offer to allow the fledgling ASA to publish material in their Bulletin of Deluge Geology until it could start its own journal, and the "dignified but definite" tone of that journal, but questioned whether it was wise to become entangled with the DGS due to what he perceived as its "strong Seventh-Day Adventist flavor." After meeting with a group of people with close ties to the DGS, Everest wrote to the ASA executive council advising against "becoming affiliated with a deluge society right off" and that he thought "[w]e would never hope to gain even the Christian geologists if we espoused [Price's] cause." He wrote to the DGS, gently rebuffing affiliation, but expressing a desire for amicable cooperation. Everest had himself already joined the DGS, but thereafter specifically requested that he be listed as a "subscriber" rather than a "member". The influence of flood geology on the ASA was finally exorcised when, in 1948, Everest approached J. Laurence Kulp to explore the topic in the ASA's upcoming annual convention. Kulp presented a paper on the Antiquity of Hominoid Fossils at this convention and on Deluge Geology at the next convention, resulting in the discomfiture and isolation of Flood Geologists within the ASA.

In 1996 he was nominated for the Templeton Prize by a fellow member of the American Scientific Affiliation.
