= Harry Rimmer =

American pastor, author, and speaker

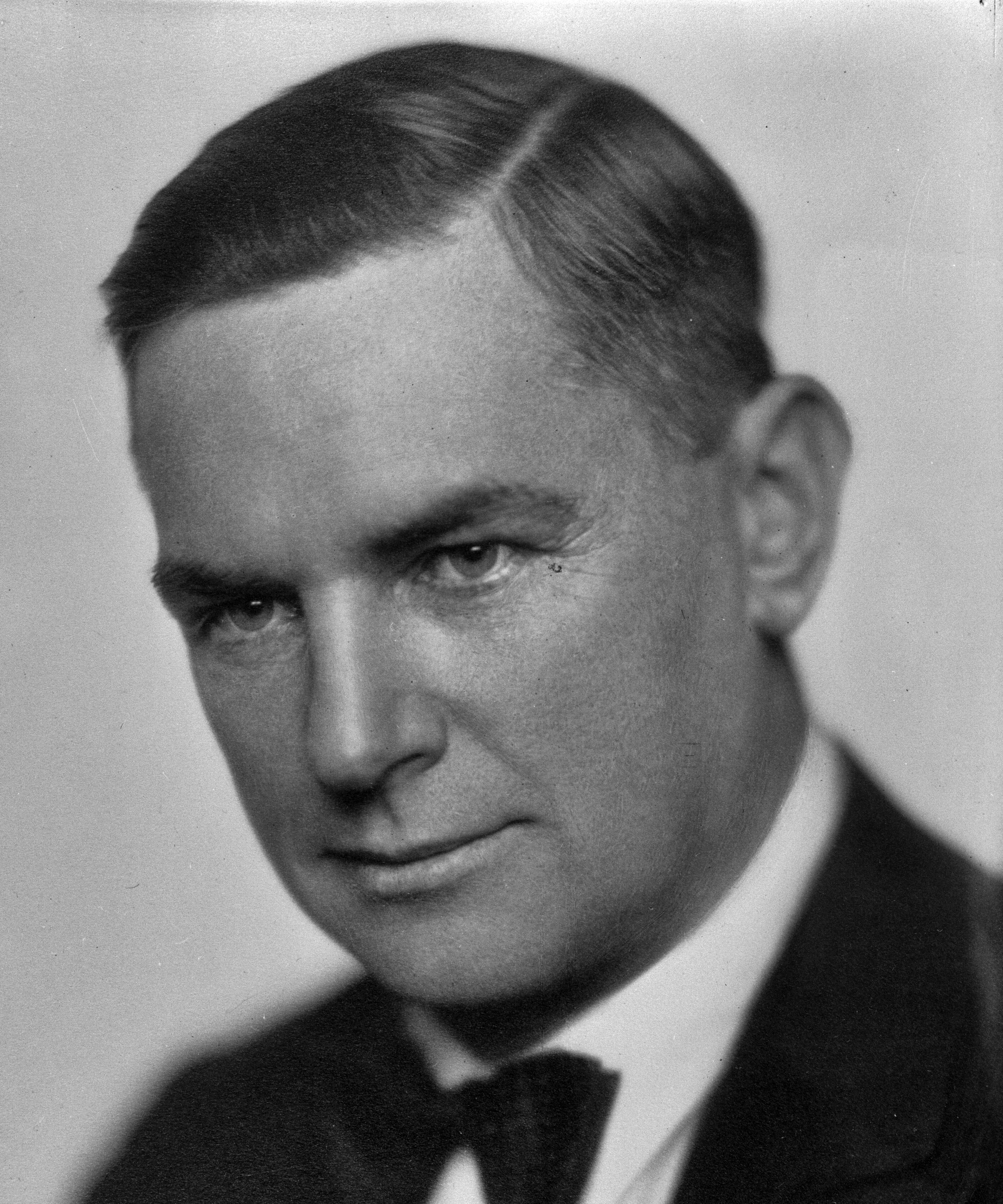
Rimmer in 1943

Harry Rimmer (1890–1952) was an American evangelist and creationist. He is most prominent as a defender of creationism in the United States, a fundamentalist leader and writer of anti-evolution publications.

He was the founder and President of the Science Research Bureau, Incorporated, a corporation set in Los Angeles, California, whose purpose he established was to prove the veracity of the Bible through studies of biology, paleontology, and anthropology. He later became a field secretary of the World Christian Fundamentals Association in the 1920s. He said to be a fellow member of the American Geographical Society.

== Biography ==
=== Early life ===
Rimmer grew up in poverty in mining and lumber camps in northern California. He was forced to quit school before completion of the third grade, and thereafter worked in a range of manual labouring roles, whilst receiving some informal education from a mining engineer, heavily slanted towards the sciences. At 19, he joined the US Army, serving in the artillery and gaining some fame as a boxer. After the military, he spent two terms at a small homeopathic medical school, supporting himself as a prizefighter, before being forced to drop out before completing the third term (and gaining a qualification), due to a lack of financial resources. It was here that he obtained much of his understanding of science, of which he bragged that he had accumulated a vocabulary of double-jointed, twelve-cylinder, knee-action words.

=== Ministry ===
Prior to this point, Rimmer had shown little interest in religion. However, while returning from a prizefight he was converted to Christianity by a street preacher and retreated to the Lake County woods with a Bible to master the tenets of his new faith. Thereafter Rimmer went to the Bible College of San Francisco (where he met his wife), and then in 1915, to southern California, where he studied briefly at Whittier College and at the Bible College of Los Angeles (now Biola University) and served as pastor of a Quaker church. In the early 1920s, Rimmer abandoned the Quakers for Presbyterianism and worked as an itinerant speaker for the YMCA. He took advantage of this contact with young men to evangelize and proselytize. He often spoke at churches, secular and religious colleges, military installations and Bible conferences.

During this period he became interested in evolution and constructed a workshop, which he called his laboratory, which he used to take pictures of microscopic organisms and other objects to illustrate his lectures and books, though rarely for actual experiments. Rimmer enrolled in a correspondence course in geology (at the University of Colorado, while on a speaking tour in the Rocky Mountains region) and started collecting fossils. Thereafter his lectures increasingly featured evolution and he acquired a reputation among fundamentalists as a qualified critic of evolution, with a fundamentalist journalist declaring:

Dr. Harry Rimmer is one of the most remarkable young men in the country. He is the rare combination of a scientist, who is a successful soul-winning evangelist

By the time he had achieved this prominence Rimmer had founded, on paper, the Research Science Bureau, which "existed primarily, if not exclusively, to underwrite Rimmer's ministry and occasional field trips." In return, members received copies of Rimmer's pamphlets and, for a short period in 1927, a monthly newsletter. During the 1920s Rimmer also traveled throughout the United States conducting excavations at various Native American burial sites and mounds, sending skeletal remains to Pittsburg, Kansas to set up a museum at what is now Pittsburg State University. (The museum was discontinued in the late 1960s.) However, with the Great Depression, funding for the Bureau (and his excavations) dried up, and it went into abeyance until the early 1940s, with Rimmer's creationist efforts instead being channeled through William Bell Riley's World Christian Fundamentals Association. In 1934, Rimmer became pastor of the First Presbyterian Church of Duluth, Minnesota, on the understanding that he would spend six months of the year writing and lecturing.

A writer for the Debunker, who attended one of Rimmer's lectures, described his "scientific" method as

to accept the Bible as absolute truth and discard, ignore, or hopelessly distort all facts that had been gathered, until the remaining facts in their distorted nature 'proved' the religious conclusions which had been established even before the facts had been consulted.

He was awarded an honorary DSc by the Wheaton College. He claimed to have visited 4000 high school assemblies in a 25-year period, or about one every two days. His principal theme was that "There are no scientific errors in the Bible."

He was the author of several books including Dead Men Tell Tales, Harmony of Science and Scripture, and Modern Science and the Genesis Record. His books sold well; some in the hundreds of thousands. However his books came under considerable scientific scrutiny and criticism. When the Christian American Scientific Affiliation's publisher, Van Kampen Press, contemplated republishing them, the ASA performed an evaluation of a representative sample which was highly critical, even recommending against publication. Edwin Y. Monsma (who would later become one of the co-founders of the Young Earth creationist Creation Research Society) gave the opinion that Rimmer's The Theory of Evolution and the Facts of Science should not have been published in the first place, contained "inaccuracies and overstatements" and relied upon ridicule.

Rimmer simply loved to debate; he would debate anyone—atheists, religious scientists, college faculty, even fellow fundamentalists. In a famous instance, he debated another creationist, William Bell Riley about the nature of the days in Genesis. He was apparently a colorful speaker and some called him the "noisiest evangelist in America".

== Views ==
Rimmer contended in some of his writings and lectures that there might have been several million years that could be squeezed between the first and third verses of the first chapter of Genesis, a position now described as "gap creationism" and one that is rejected by adherents of the young Earth creationist view. Rimmer was particularly interested in the Noachian Flood and Joshua's long day. Rimmer maintained that the Flood in Genesis was only a local flood, another view that is inconsistent with Young Earth creationism.

He wrote that "In all of our scientific progress we have not yet discovered one single fact that contradicts or refutes any statement in the Bible." He had a gift for producing unlikely explanations to protect the veracity of the biblical text. For example, Rimmer stated that Jonah could live after being swallowed by a whale because Rimmer postulated that there is a special cavity in the heads of whales which are the whales' "breathing tanks" for underwater breathing. Rimmer also insisted that the passage where rabbits chew their cuds is the result of a mistaken translation, and claimed that camels do not have cloven hooves.

Rimmer tried to use science to prove the veracity of the Bible. One of the sources he relied on was a speculative book entitled Joshua's Long Day and the Dial of Ahaz published by Charles Totten, an instructor in Military Science at Yale in 1890. Rimmer claimed that the Bible story in which Joshua ordered the sun to stand still in the heavens had been definitely proved by a Yale Professor (Totten). An updated version of this claim has it that some NASA scientists discovered a missing period of 24 hours. He also promoted a version of the urban legend of James Bartley and a sperm whale, which he used to uphold a literal interpretation of Jonah.

== Offer and trials ==
In the mid-1920s, Rimmer offered $100 to anybody who could prove that the Bible was not inerrant. Although he received an enormous number of responses, he accepted none as demonstrating a biblical error to his satisfaction.

On two occasions claimants took Rimmer to court. The first was in 1929 when a retired army colonel challenged the story of God feeding the children of Israel in the wilderness by sending so many quail that they were piled up to two cubits high for a days journey around the camp, which he calculated would require over 29 × 10^{12} quails (or over 12 million per Israelite). However, the judge, apparently reasoning that Moses was a more reliable witness than the colonel, ruled against him. In 1939, the Research Science Bureau upped the offer to $1000.

=== Floyd-Rimmer Trial ===
William Floyd, Editor of The Arbitrator, a New York atheist magazine, sued Rimmer on the grounds that he had discovered five scientific errors in the Bible:

1. the six-day creation story;
2. contradictions between Genesis 1 and 2;
3. the record of Noah's Ark;
4. the alleged number of quail; and
5. descriptions of the camel, the coney, and the hare in Leviticus 11:4-6.

Floyd disclaimed interest in the money, describing his intent as "to convince fundamentalists, through court judgement[,] that there are such errors in the Bible."

During the trial, Rimmer defended the Bible with statements such as "You could get two of every species of insect on the hides of two good-sized elephants, and they would not, therefore, occupy any additional space in the ark" and "most all present-day scientists have completely discredited the theory of the record of the rocks." Rimmer said of his testimony, "I showed how God pushed the clouds further back and made what the aviators call a 'ceiling' between the clouds and the substance of the earth, and God called it a 'firmament' and men call this cloudy ceiling 'heaven'."

Rimmer won the case on a technicality: the particular newspaper advertisement that Floyd responded to was not placed by Rimmer himself. Despite this, Rimmer claimed that the trial "ended in legally establishing the position of all who hold that the Word of God is inerrant".

== Works ==
=== Books ===
- The Theory of Evolution and the Facts of Science] (1935)
- Evidences for Immortality (1935)
- The Harmony of Science and Scripture (1936)
- The Coming War and the Rise of Russia (1940)
- Palestine: The Coming Storm Center (1941)

=== Pamphlets ===
- A Consideration of the Credibility of the Chronology of the Bible
- Modern Science and the Long Day of Joshua
- Modern Science in an Ancient Book
- Modern Science, Jonah and the Whale
- Monkeyshines: Fakes, Fables, Facts Concerning Evolution (1926), Los Angeles
- The Theories of Evolution and the Facts of Paleontology

== See also ==
- Biblical archaeology
- History of creationism

== Bibliography ==
=== Books ===
- Dead men tell tales, Harry Rimmer, Eerdmans; Thirteenth ed edition (1974), ISBN 0-8028-1167-1
- Internal evidence of inspiration, Harry Rimmer, Wm. B. Eerdmans Pub. Co; 7th ed edition (1946), ASIN: B00087HOWM
- Lot's wife and the science of physics, Harry Rimmer, Wm. B. Eerdmans Pub. Co (1947) ASIN: B0007EHCPK
- Modern science and the Genesis record, Harry Rimmer, Eerdmans (1937), ASIN: B0007ELV7A
- The coming King, Harry Rimmer, Wm. B. Eerdmans; 2d ed edition (1943) ASIN: B0007I70XU
- The crucible of Calvary, Harry Rimmer, Eerdmans; 3rd ed edition (1945) ASIN: B0007HHFAO
- The harmony of science and Scripture, Harry Rimmer, Eerdmans; 12th ed edition (1947), ASIN: B00088BO6I
- The shadow of coming events, Harry Rimmer, Wm. B. Eerdmans Publishing Company; 1st edition (1946) ASIN: B000AQO76C
- The theory of evolution and the facts of science, Harry Rimmer, Wm. B. Eerdmans; 7th ed edition (1944) ASIN: B0008C8FAM
- Voices from the silent centuries, Harry Rimmer, Wm. B. Eerdmans Pub. Co; 4th ed edition (1937), ASIN: B00086ZVIW
