= West Clark Community Schools =

School district in Indiana, United States

Coordinates: 38°24′33.1″N 85°45′20.4″W

West Clark Community Schools was a school district serving students in the western half of Clark County, Indiana, United States. It consisted of three high schools, Silver Creek High School, William W. Borden High School, and Henryville jr/sr High School, along with their various middle and elementary feeders.

During the 2020 primary elections in Indiana, voters in Clark County approved a proposal to split the district, which took effect on July 1, 2020. Silver Creek High and its feeder schools are now operated by the Silver Creek School Corporation, and the other two high schools and their feeders are now operated by the Borden–Henryville School Corporation.

== See also ==
- Hendren v. Campbell: a 1977 court case on the district's adoption of a creationist textbook
