= Henry C. Slusher =

Medal of Honor recipient

Private Henry C. Slusher
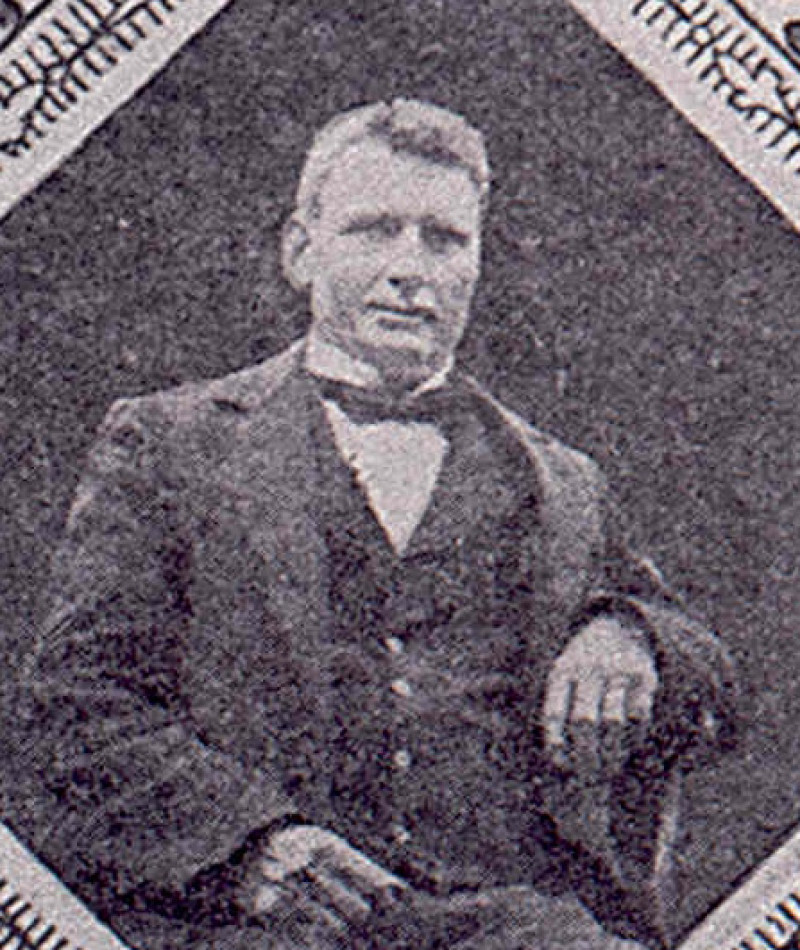
- Born: 10 May 1846; Washington County, Pennsylvania, U.S.
- Died: 12 March 1923 (aged 76); Washington, Pennsylvania, U.S.
- Burial place: Lone Pine Cemetery, Amwell Township, Pennsylvania, U.S.
- Military career
- Allegiance: United States
- Branch: Army
- Service years: 1862-1865
- Rank: Private
- Units: Company F, 22nd Pennsylvania Cavalry Regiment
- Conflicts: Moorefield, West Virginia
- Awards: Medal of Honor

Henry C. Slusher (May 10, 1846 - March 12, 1923) was a private in the United States Army who was awarded the Medal of Honor for actions performed on 11 September 1863 at Moorefield, West Virginia.

== Personal life ==
Slusher was born on May 10, 1846, in Washington County, Pennsylvania.

== Military service ==
Slusher enlisted as a private in the Army on 14 October 1862 and was mustered into Company F of the 22nd Pennsylvania Cavalry. Later, while serving with Troop E of Ringgold's Independent Volunteer Cavalry, he participated in an ambush against a group of Mosby's Guerillas who had taken 146 Union soldiers prisoner in a prior engagement. After spotting his messmate William P. Hagner amongst the prisoners, he charged across the river and engaged the Confederates in hand-to-hand combat. He was eventually taken prisoner and was kept in Libby Prison in Richmond, Virginia.

Slusher's Medal of Honor citation reads:

The President of the United States of America, in the name of Congress, takes pleasure in presenting the Medal of Honor to Private Henry C. Slusher, United States Army, for extraordinary heroism on 11 September 1863, while serving with Troop F, 22d Pennsylvania Volunteer Cavalry, in action at Moorefield, West Virginia. Private Slusher voluntarily crossed a branch of the Potomac River under fire to rescue a wounded comrade held prisoner by the enemy. Was wounded and taken prisoner in the attempt.

— Russell A. Alger, Secretary of War

He was mustered out of the Army on 19 July 1865.

== Death ==
He died on March 12, 1923, in Washington, Pennsylvania and was buried in Lone Pine Cemetery, Amwell Township, Pennsylvania.
