= William Bell Riley =

American fundamentalist Baptist pastor (1861–1947)

- Born: March 22, 1861; Greene County, Indiana, U.S.
- Died: December 5, 1947 (aged 86); Golden Valley, Minnesota, U.S.
- Resting place: Lakewood Cemetery

Education
- Education: Southern Baptist Theological Seminary

Philosophical work
- School: Baptist, antievolutionism, fundamentalism

William Bell Riley (March 22, 1861 – December 5, 1947) was an American Baptist evangelical Christian pastor who spoke against modernism and evolution. He was known as "The Grand Old Man of Fundamentalism."

Riley served as the pastor of First Baptist Church in Minneapolis for 50 years, between 1897 and his death in 1947. He founded the World Christian Fundamentals Association in 1919, one of the foremost anti-evolutionist organizations in the United States.

== Biography ==
Riley was born in Indiana, with Irish heritage.

In 1878, at the age of 17, Riley publicly professed faith in Christ. He had planned to study law, but shortly after his conversion he felt called to the ministry. After being educated at normal school in Valparaiso, Indiana, Riley received his teacher's certificate. After teaching in county schools, he attended college in Hanover, Indiana, where he received an A.B. degree in 1885. In 1888 he graduated from the Southern Baptist Theological Seminary in Louisville, Kentucky.

He served several Baptist churches in Kentucky, Indiana, and Illinois before taking the pastorate at the First Baptist Church in Minneapolis in 1897. He was known as "The Grand Old Man of Fundamentalism". During his early career as pastor, Riley sought to open the church to servants, factory workers, and other non-aristocrats. He further alienated some members when he openly opposed the Spanish—American War of 1898, and many left to found the Trinity Baptist Church, also in Minneapolis.

Riley wrote a number of texts on Christian evangelism and founded the Northwestern Bible Training School along with an Evangelical Seminary in 1902.

In 1919 Riley founded the World Christian Fundamentals Association (WCFA), which helped give birth to organized fundamentalism. The organization was one of the most enduring anti-evolutionist organizations of the early 20th century. In 1925, Riley and the WCFA helped secure William Jennings Bryan as the lead prosecutor during the Scopes trial. They also supported anti-evolution legislation in Arkansas, California, Minnesota, and Texas throughout the 1920s. Riley campaigned for the removal of textbooks teaching evolution from the University of Minnesota and Carleton College. During his career, Riley debated many public figures on the topic of evolution, including David F. Swenson, and Dr. Edward Adams Cantrell

In March 1927, Riley challenged Minnesota Daily editor Howard Haycraft and University of Minnesota president Lotus Hoffman to defend evolution in a debate, at which point Haycraft presented a scroll of paper containing 6,500 signatures of university students who opposed the censorship of evolution teachings. This show of force killed a Minnesota Senate bill introduced by Konrad K. Solberg which would have prohibited evolution teaching in public schools and colleges, and showed that anti-evolution legislation did not enjoy mass support.

Theologically, Riley was a Baptist traditionalist who subscribed to the New Hampshire Confession of Faith of 1833, the most popular Baptist creed of the 19th century. His first major work was an exposition of the Confession and in 1922 he tried to help the fundamentalist faction of the Northern Baptist Convention gain control and reject theological liberalism by convincing the Convention to adopt the Confession as its binding statement of faith.

Riley was the editor of The Christian Fundamentalist from 1927 to 1932. Riley was president of the Minnesota Baptist State Convention in 1944–45. When Riley died in 1947, Billy Graham, whom Riley had chosen to succeed him as president of Northwestern, conducted the funeral services. At Riley's death, Northwestern Bible School was the second-largest Bible school in the world, with some 1,200 students enrolled. He was buried in Lakewood Cemetery.

He resigned after forty-five years but served as pastor emeritus until his death five years later

== Views ==
=== Evolution ===
In 1923 Riley set up the Anti-Evolution League of Minnesota, which blossomed the following year into the Anti-Evolution League of America (later run by T. T. Martin). While the anti-evolution crusade is often thought of as a Southern phenomenon, two of its foremost leaders, Riley and John Roach Straton, were from Minneapolis and New York City respectively. In the early 1920s Riley promoted a vigorous anti-evolutionary campaign in the Northwest and it was Riley's World Christian Fundamentals Association that wired William Jennings Bryan urging him to act as counsel for the association in the Scopes Trial.

Riley and Bryan tried to remove all teaching of evolution from public schools. One of the creationists in their movement, T. T. Martin claimed that German soldiers who killed Belgian and French children by giving them poisoned candy were angels compared to those who spread evolution ideas in schools. Riley also claimed that "an international Jewish-Bolshevik-Darwinist conspiracy to promote evolutionism in the classroom" was behind the changes in curriculum occurring in the 1920s. Riley advocated a form of "Day-Age Creationism".

The main objection that Riley had to evolution was:

The first and most important reason for its elimination is in the unquestioned fact that evolution is not a science; it is a hypothesis only, a speculation.

=== Antisemitism ===
Some of Riley's beliefs and writings were considered antisemitic. He wrote and spoke extensively about Jews, especially in relation to Communism, crime and historical social influence. He promoted the antisemitic canard of linking Jews with mysterious sources of influence, power and money. In his Introduction to a collection of Riley's anti-evolutionary writings William Trollinger, the editor, describes Riley's belief in a worldwide Jewish conspiracy to control the media and the economy. Trollinger believed Riley was partly influenced by the anti-Jewish Czarist forgery The Protocols of the Elders of Zion. Henry Ford had been promoting the Protocols at that time through his newspaper The Dearborn Independent. Riley believed that Jews had a prominent role in promoting evolution to undermine religious and social values. Riley saw this as part of a wider plot involving Communism's plan to conquer America, especially through the administration of Franklin D. Roosevelt, whom he accused of being part of a communist conspiracy. Riley declared that Soviet Russia "was under the dominance of a successful mob of atheistic Jews." Riley described the origins of World War I as the result of the maneuvering of Jewish bankers and arms dealers. Riley preached a sermon entitled "Shivering at the sight of a shirt" in support of the Fascist Silver Shirts (of the Silver Legion of America) calling them "defenders of the Constitution." In his book, The Nazi Hydra in America: Suppressed History of a Century, Glen Yeadon compares Riley's use of anti-Jewish imagery and rhetoric in his sermons and writings to Hitler's propaganda. Riley was an open supporter of Hitler who defended antisemitic views of the Nazis.

"Jewry, from the day that she crucified Jesus Christ until the present time, has given many occasions for her own rejection… Hear Hitler, who speaks from firsthand knowledge: 'the Jew is the cause and beneficiary of our slavery. The Jew has caused our misery, and today he lives on our troubles. That is the reason that as nationalists, we are enemies of the Jew. He has ruined our race, rotted our morals, corrupted our traditions, and broken our power.'"

Some writers think that Riley moved towards anti Semitism after the failure of his crusade against evolution, blaming the Jews for his inability to influence Schools against teaching evolution. Trollinger also argues that Riley was influenced by and became a leading part of the antisemitism prevalent in Minneapolis. There were also parts of wider fundamentalist culture at that time adopting antisemitic conspiracy theories.

Riley denied that he was an antisemite. He argued that he was merely commenting on social conditions at the time, and that he theologically and personally supported the Jews. Soon after the British Army entered Jerusalem in 1917, Riley described his hopes of a restored Jewish state and the role of Jerusalem in end time events in a published sermon. Riley also believed that Jews as a race had been "under God's punishment", similar to the theology of Medieval antisemitism. Riley continued to be a supporter of more modern manifestations of antisemitism, such as belief in a worldwide Jewish-Bolshevik-Darwinist conspiracy.

=== Political views ===
Early in his career, Riley was a radical leftist, opening the First Baptist Church to the working class and openly opposing the Spanish—American War. By the 1930s, Riley had become a fervent anti-communist, opposing Franklin D. Roosevelt's New Deal programs as well.

== Award ==
In 1908, the Southwestern Baptist University of Jackson, Tennessee, conferred upon Riley an honorary D.D. degree.

== Works by W.B. Riley ==
=== Books and pamphlets ===
- The Bible of the Expositor and the Evangelist. 40 Volumes. Cleveland: Union Gospel Press, 1925–1938.
- The Crisis of the Church. New York: Charles C. Cook, 1914.
- A Debate: Resolved, that the Creative Days in Genesis Were Aeons, Not Solar Days. With Harry Rimmer. Los Angeles: Research Science Bureau, [1930?].
- Doom of World Governments. Minneapolis: University of Northwestern: William Bell Riley Collection online.
- The Evolution of the Kingdom. New York: Charles C. Cook, 1913.
- The Finality of Higher Criticism; or, The Theory of Evolution and False Theology. [Minneapolis?]: W.B. Riley, 1909.
- Hitlerism; or, The Philosophy of Evolution in Action. Minneapolis: Irene Woods [1941?].
- Inspiration or Evolution. Cleveland: Union Gospel Press, 1926.
- Jerusalem and the Jew. Minneapolis: University of Northwestern: William Bell Riley Collection online.
- The Jew and Communism. Minneapolis: University of Northwestern: William Bell Riley Collection online.
- The Menace of Modernism. New York: Christian Alliance Co., 1917.
- Messages for the Metropolis. Minneapolis: Winona Publishing Co., 1906.
- My Bible: An Apologetic. Grand Rapids, Mich.: Wm. B. Eerdmans Publishing Co., 1937.
- Painting America Red. Wichita, Kan.: Defender Tract Club, [194-?].
- The Philosophies of Father Coughlin. Grand Rapids, Mich.: Zondervan Publishing Co., 1935.
- The Promised Return. Chicago: Star Printing Co., [1897?].
- Problems of Youth. Grand Rapids, Mich.: Zondervan Publishing House, 1941.
- Prophecy and the Red Russian Menace. Minneapolis: L.W. Camp, [193-?].
- Protocols and Communism. Minneapolis: L.W. Camp, [1934?].
- Revival Sermons: Essentials in Effective Evangelism. New York: Fleming H. Revell Co., 1939.
- Riley versus Robinson: a Discussion of the Superintendency of Minneapolis Schools. [Minneapolis: Luverne Gustavson?], [1944?].
- Shivering at the Sight of a Shirt. [Minneapolis: L.W. Camp], 1936.
- Socialism in Our Schools: Sovietizing the State through Schools. [Minneapolis: L.W. Camp?], [1923?].
- Ten Burning Questions. New York: Fleming H. Revell Co., 1932.
- Ten Sermons on the Greater Doctrines of Scripture. Bloomington, Ill.: Leader Publishing Co., 1891.
- Vagaries and Verities; or, Sunday Nights in Soul-Winning. Minneapolis: Hall, Black, and Co., 1903.
- Wanted--A World Leader! Minneapolis: W.B. Riley, [1939?].
- What Is Fundamentalism? [Minneapolis: L.W. Camp], [1927?].

== Works on W.B. Riley ==
- Hull, Lloyd B. A Rhetorical Study of the Preaching of William Bell Riley. PhD., Wayne State University, 1960.
- McBirnie, Robert Sheldon. Basic Issues in the Fundamentalism of W.B. Riley. PhD., State University of Iowa, 1952.
- Riley, Marie Acomb. The Dynamic of a Dream: The Life Story of Dr. William B. Riley. Grand Rapids, Mich.: Wm. B. Eerdmans, 1938.
- Szasz, Ferenc Morton. Three Fundamentalist Leaders: The Roles of William Bell Riley, John Roach Straton, and William Jennings Bryan in the Fundamentalist-Modernist Controversy. PhD., University of Rochester, 1969.
- Trollinger, William Vance. God's Empire: William Bell Riley and Midwestern Fundamentalism. Madison, Wis: University of Wisconsin Press, 1990.
- Trollinger, William Vance. The Antievolution Pamphlets of William Bell Riley. New York : Garland Pub, 1995.

== Historical works on the political, social, and religious history of the era ==
- Berman, Hyman. Political Anti-Semitism in Minnesota During the Great Depression. New York : 1979.
- Dinnerstein, Leonard. Antisemitism in America. New York : Oxford University Press. 1994.
- Lundin, Roger. Christ Across the Disciplines: Past, Present, Future. Grand Rapids, Michigan : William B. Eerdmans Publishing Company. 2013.
- Marsden, George. Fundamentalism and American Culture: The Shaping of Twentieth Century Evangelicalism, 1870-1925. New York: Oxford University Press, 1980.
- Yeadon, Glen. The Nazi Hydra in America: Suppressed History of a Century. California: Progressive Press, 2008.
