= Creation Research Society =

Christian fundamentalist group

The Creation Research Society (CRS) is a Christian fundamentalist group that requires of its members belief that the Bible is historically and scientifically true in the original autographs, belief that "original created kinds" of all living things were created during the Creation week described in Genesis, and belief in flood geology.

The organization has produced various publications describing what it calls creation science, including a journal and a creation-based biology textbook; use of the textbook in public schools was ruled unconstitutional in Hendren v. Campbell.

During the first few years of its existence, different beliefs about Creationism and disagreement over its statement of beliefs resulted in various members of the CRS board and voting members being forced out of the organization.

== History ==
=== Formation ===
Walter E. Lammerts formed the organization in the 1950s after becoming concerned that the American Scientific Affiliation was falling under the influence of theistic evolution. It was originally named the Creation Research Advisory Committee in February 1963, and headed by Walter E. Lammerts and William J. Tinkle with assistance from Henry M. Morris. The committee originally consisted of ten creationists: Lammerts, Tinkle, Morris, John W. Klotz, Frank Lewis Marsh, Edwin Y. Monsma, Duane Gish, Wilbert H. Rusch, John J. Grebe, and R. Laird Harris. The CRS was later formed in June 1963, with the original advisory committee constituting the new society's 'steering committee', with Karl W. Linsenmann, David A. Warriner and John N. Moore joining it at that time. At about the same time, Morris recruited Harold Slusher, Thomas G. Barnes, Willis L. Webb and later Clifford L. Burdlick. Finally, Paul A. Zimmerman joined it. By the end of the year had expanded to approximately fifty members. Members with at least an M.Sc. or equivalent were eligible to be voting members.

=== Textbook project ===
In response to the Sputnik-inspired emphasis on science education, and the resultant Biological Sciences Curriculum Study textbooks (which emphasised evolution for the first time), creationists in the early 1960s were searching for an orthodox and up-to-date creationist biology textbook. The CRS responded with Biology: A Search for Order in Complexity, published in 1970 by Christian publisher Zondervan, which was a mixed success, selling out its first run of 10,000, and being approved by a number of state textbook committees but being adopted by few public schools. After an Indiana school attempted to make exclusive use of it, a state court ruled that its use in public schools was unconstitutional (in Hendren v. Campbell) stating:

The question is whether a text obviously designed to present only the view of Biblical Creationism in a favorable light is constitutionally acceptable in the public schools of Indiana. Two hundred years of constitutional government demands that the answer be no.

== Beliefs and stated purpose ==
The statement of belief was an issue of discussion among the 10 founders during its formation, with typical wrangling over wording, and little consensus beyond keeping out anyone supportive of evolution. There was concern whether Flood Geology would be able to explain all geologic evidence, and whether the six literal-day creation included the creation of the universe.

The CRS adopted the following statement of belief, mandatory for all members:

1. The Bible is the written Word of God, and because it is inspired throughout, all its assertions are historically and scientifically true in the original autographs. To the student of nature this means that the account of origins in Genesis is a factual presentation of simple historical truths.
2. All basic types of living things, including man, were made by direct creative acts of God during the Creation Week described in Genesis. Whatever biological changes have occurred since Creation Week have accomplished only changes within the original created kinds.
3. The great flood described in Genesis, commonly referred to as the Noachian Flood, was an historic event worldwide in its extent and effect.
4. We are an organization of Christian men and women of science who accept Jesus Christ as our Lord and Savior. The account of the special creation of Adam and Eve as one man and one woman and their subsequent fall into sin is the basis for our belief in the necessity of a Savior for all mankind. Therefore, salvation can come only through accepting Jesus Christ as our Savior.

The society's stated purpose is "publication and research which impinge on creation as an alternate view of origins".

The CRS's statement of belief was cited in the U.S. Supreme Court ruling of Edwards v. Aguillard. Its mandate that members affirm that the origin story described in Genesis was an established fact was cited by Justice Lewis F. Powell, Jr. as evidence there was a fundamentalist sectarian objective in the field of creation science, and also a fundamentalist sectarian objective in Louisiana's 1981 Balanced Treatment Act, a law requiring creation science instruction in the state's public schools wherever scientific evolution was taught. The judge ruled, "the intent of the Louisiana Legislature was to promote a particular religious belief" and therefore the teaching of creationism was unconstitutional.

=== Publications ===
The Creation Research Society Quarterly has been published since July, 1964. Creation Matters containing popular level articles has been published bi-monthly since 1996. CRS has also published an assortment of special papers, monographs and books. Creationist publications have been criticized by scientists, such as Massimo Pigliucci, as "nonsense" in their attempt to blend faith with empirical fact. Glenn R. Morton is an author of more than 20 articles published by CRS in an attempt to "solve scientific problems" of Young-Earth Creationism. Morton later left the creationist movement complaining "The reaction to the pictures, seismic data, the logic disgusted me. They were more interested in what I sounded like than in the data!".

=== Early purges ===
The organization's early growth allowed Lammerts to purge committee members who were insufficiently active or orthodox. Four committee members were removed: Monsma and Webb for inactivity, Harris for opposing a literal six-day creation, and Warriner after losing his university position and suggesting that the society hire him as a paid promoter. These members were replaced by George F. Howe, Bolton Davidheiser and H. Douglas Dean. Dean and Davidheiser left after only two years, Dean because of his unorthodox views on evolution, and Davidheiser because he was unable to work with Seventh Day Adventists on the committee. Marsh, an Adventist, left about the same time because he interpreted the society's weekend meetings as a religious affront.

By the end of 1964, the society had grown sufficiently that Lammerts decided to purge the society of Old Earth, Gap and Day Age creationists:

I am determined to get our organization so clearly committed to not only creation but flood geology and the young earth concept that it will later be difficult to deviate from these commitments.

In 1967, Lammerts arranged for Morris to succeed him as chairman of the board, in order to ensure continuing fidelity to flood geology. Historian of creationism Ronald L. Numbers states that the Society "acquired a well-deserved reputation for welcoming only committed flood geologists."

=== Laboratory ===
The Creation Research Society maintains a working electron microscope laboratory (scanning EM and transmission EM) at the Van Andel Creation Research Center in Chino Valley, AZ, although they will be moving their operation center and research laboratories to the campus of Arizona Christian University, Glendale, AZ. In 2013 Mark Armitage and Kevin Anderson of the CRS published their findings of soft tissues in Triceratops horn collected at the Hell Creek Formation in Glendive, MT.
