= Russell L. Mixter =

- Born: August 7, 1906; Williamston, Michigan
- Died: January 16, 2007 (aged 100)
- Education: Wheaton College, Illinois (undergraduate), Michigan State College (M.S.), University of Illinois School of Medicine in Chicago (Ph.D.)
- Known for: Progressive creationism, opposition to anti-evolutionism
- Scientific career
- Fields: Biology

Russell L. Mixter (August 7, 1906 – January 16, 2007) was an American scientist, noted for leading the American Scientific Affiliation (ASA) away from anti-evolutionism, and for his advocacy of progressive creationism.

== Academic career ==
Mixter graduated from Wheaton College, Illinois, in 1928 with a major in literature and a minor in biology. He thereafter gained an M.S. in zoology from Michigan State College and a Ph.D. in anatomy from the University of Illinois School of Medicine in Chicago, shortly after returning to Wheaton to teach. He has been professor of zoology there since 1945, and was chairman of the Science Division from 1950 to 1961.

Wheaton College awards the Mixter Award for junior or senior biology majors in his honor, in recognition of his "significant role in the development of biology at Wheaton College".

== American Scientific Affiliation and creationism ==
Mixter joined the ASA in 1943, served as its president from 1951–1954, and the editor of its journal from 1965–1968.

After a brief flirtation with flood geology, Mixter advocated the viewpoint that he called progressive creationism for the rest of his life. Along with Wheaton compatriot J. Frank Cassel, he led the ASA away from antievolutionism, bringing evangelicals into harmony with modern biology, whilst stopping short of an outright endorsement of theistic evolution.

== Personal information ==
His parents were Floyd B. Mixter, a salesman, and Florence (Barlow) Mixter. He married Emilie Claus (died August 2, 1998) on June 27, 1931, and they had four children: Wilbur, Joan (Mrs. Jerry Sweers), Ruth, Priscilla (Mrs. Gordon Gault).

== Bibliography ==
- Creation and Evolution (monograph), American Scientific Affiliation, 1951.
- Evolution and Christian Thought Today (ed.), Eerdmans, 1959.
