= World Christian Fundamentals Association =

Religious organization founded 1919

- Abbreviation: WCFA
- Formation: 1919
- Type: Religious organization
- Purpose: Lobby for anti-evolution legislation Christian fundamentalism
- Leader: William Bell Riley
- Field secretary: Harry Rimmer
- Affiliations: Democratic Party

The World's Christian Fundamentals Association (WCFA) was a Christian evangelical organization founded in 1919 by the Baptist minister William Bell Riley of the First Baptist Church, Minneapolis, Minnesota. The WCFA was originally formed to launch "a new Protestantism" based upon premillennial interpretations of biblical prophecy, but soon turned its focus more towards opposition to evolution. As one scholar wrote, the organization "gave birth to organized Fundamentalism" in the United States and Canada.

== History ==
The WCFA was a merger between meetings of conservative churchmen in New York City and Philadelphia in the late 1910s. It was founded as a Democratic, interdenominational, fundamentalist group combatting evolution theory. Although officially founded in 1919, its first meeting led by William Bell Riley took place in the summer of 1918 in the house of R. A. Torrey, editor of The Fundamentals, with the goal of uniting conservative fundamentalist Christians in the fight against theological liberalism. The inaugural conference opened in 1919 with an attendance of 6,000 people, and was centered around warnings against modernism. According to Charles Allyn Russell, the organization's meetings, which were attended by thousands of conservatives from the United States and Canada, "gave birth to organized Fundamentalism."

As WCFA moved forward, it began to focus more and more on organizing opposition to evolution. The WCFA supported anti-evolutionist legislation in Kentucky in 1922, as well as similar bills across the country, setting the groundwork for the Scopes trial to become a major test for the influence of fundamentalism in the United States. Riley and the WCFA helped secure William Jennings Bryan as the lead prosecutor during the Scopes trial in 1925. They also supported anti-evolution legislation in Arkansas, California, and Texas throughout the 1920s.

WCFA published a journal, Christian Fundamentals in Schools and Churches, although the title referred to the organization's original goal of supporting fundamentalist and anti-modernist teachings in divinity schools rather than the evolution vs creationism debate in public schools.

== See also ==
- American Council of Christian Churches
- Fundamentalist–modernist controversy

== Sources used ==
- Larson, Edward John (1997). Summer for the Gods: The Scopes Trial and America's Continuing Debate Over Science and Religion. BasicBooks. ISBN 978-0-465-07509-6.
- Numbers, Ronald (2006). The Creationists: From Scientific Creationism to Intelligent Design. Harvard University Press. ISBN 0-674-02339-0.
- Russell, Charles Allyn (1976). Voices of American Fundamentalism: Seven Biographical Studies. Westminster Press. ISBN 978-0-664-20814-1.
- Szasz, Ferenc M. (2022). "William B. Riley and the Fight Against Teaching of Evolution in Minnesota". Minnesota History. 68 (1): 23–34. ISSN 0026-5497.
