= God of the gaps =

Theological argument

"God of the gaps" is a theological concept that emerged in the 19th century, and revolves around the idea that certain gaps in scientific understanding are regarded as indications of the existence of God. This perspective has its origins in the observation that some individuals, often with religious inclinations, point to areas where science falls short in explaining natural phenomena as opportunities to insert the presence of a divine creator. The term itself was coined in response to this tendency. This theological view suggests that God fills in the gaps left by scientific knowledge, and that these gaps represent moments of divine intervention or influence.

This concept has been met with criticism and debate from various quarters. Detractors argue that this perspective is problematic as it seems to rely on gaps in human understanding and ignorance to make its case for the existence of God. As scientific knowledge continues to advance, these gaps tend to shrink, potentially weakening the argument for God's existence. Critics contend that such an approach can undermine religious beliefs by suggesting that God only operates in the unexplained areas of our understanding, leaving little room for divine involvement in a comprehensive and coherent worldview.

The "God of the gaps" perspective has been criticized for its association with logical fallacies. The "God of the gaps" perspective is also a form of confirmation bias, since it involves interpreting ambiguous evidence (or rather no evidence) as supporting one's existing attitudes. This type of reasoning is seen as inherently flawed and does not provide a robust foundation for religious faith. In this context, some theologians and scientists have proposed that a more satisfactory approach is to view evidence of God's actions within the natural processes themselves, rather than relying on the gaps in scientific understanding to validate religious beliefs.

== Origins of the term ==
From the 1880s, Friedrich Nietzsche's Thus Spoke Zarathustra, Part Two, "On Priests", said that "into every gap they put their delusion, their stopgap, which they called God". The concept, although not the exact wording, goes back to Henry Drummond, a 19th-century evangelist lecturer, from his 1893 Lowell Lectures on The Ascent of Man. He chastises those Christians who point to the things that Science has not explained as presence of God – "gaps which they will fill up with God" – and urges them to embrace all nature as God's, as the work of "an immanent God, which is the God of Evolution, is infinitely grander than the occasional wonder-worker, who is the God of an old theology."

In 1933, Ernest Barnes, the Bishop of Birmingham, used the phrase in a discussion of general relativity's implication of a Big Bang:

Must we then postulate Divine intervention? Are we to bring in God to create the first current of Laplace's nebula or to let off the cosmic firework of Lemaître's imagination? I confess an unwillingness to bring God in this way upon the scene. The circumstances which thus seem to demand his presence are too remote and too obscure to afford me any true satisfaction. Men have thought to find God at the special creation of their own species, or active when mind or life first appeared on earth. They have made him God of the gaps in human knowledge. To me the God of the trigger is as little satisfying as the God of the gaps. It is because throughout the physical Universe I find thought and plan and power that behind it I see God as the creator.

During World War II, the German theologian and martyr Dietrich Bonhoeffer expressed the concept in similar terms in letters he wrote while in a Nazi prison. Bonhoeffer wrote, for example:

how wrong it is to use God as a stop-gap for the incompleteness of our knowledge. If in fact the frontiers of knowledge are being pushed further and further back (and that is bound to be the case), then God is being pushed back with them, and is therefore continually in retreat. We are to find God in what we know, not in what we don't know.

In his 1955 book Science and Christian Belief Charles Alfred Coulson (1910–1974) wrote:

There is no 'God of the gaps' to take over at those strategic places where science fails; and the reason is that gaps of this sort have the unpreventable habit of shrinking.

and

Either God is in the whole of Nature, with no gaps, or He's not there at all.

Coulson was a mathematics professor at Oxford University as well as a Methodist church leader, often appearing in the religious programs of British Broadcasting Corporation. His book got national attention, was reissued as a paperback, and was reprinted several times, most recently in 1971. It is claimed that the actual phrase 'God of the gaps' was invented by Coulson.

The term was then used in a 1971 book and a 1978 article, by Richard Bube. He articulated the concept in greater detail in Man come of Age: Bonhoeffer's Response to the God-of-the-Gaps (1978). Bube attributed modern crises in religious faith in part to the inexorable shrinking of the God-of-the-gaps as scientific knowledge progressed. As humans progressively increased their understanding of nature, the previous "realm" of God seemed to many persons and religions to be getting smaller and smaller by comparison. Bube maintained that Darwin's Origin of Species was the "death knell" of the God-of-the-gaps. Bube also maintained that the God-of-the-gaps was not the same as the God of the Bible (that is, he was not making an argument against God per se, but rather asserting there was a fundamental problem with the perception of God as existing in the gaps of present-day knowledge).

== General usage ==
The term "God of the gaps" is sometimes used in describing the incremental retreat of religious explanations of physical phenomena in the face of increasingly comprehensive scientific explanations for those phenomena. Dorothy Dinnerstein includes psychological explanations for developmental distortions leading to a person believing in a deity, particularly a male deity.

R. Laird Harris writes of the physical science aspect of this:

The expression, "God of the Gaps," contains a real truth. It is erroneous if it is taken to mean that God is not immanent in natural law but is only to be observed in mysteries unexplained by law. No significant Christian group has believed this view. It is true, however, if it be taken to emphasize that God is not only immanent in natural law but also is active in the numerous phenomena associated with the supernatural and the spiritual. There are gaps in a physical-chemical explanation of this world, and there always will be. Because science has learned many marvelous secrets of nature, it cannot be concluded that it can explain all phenomena. Meaning, soul, spirits, and life are subjects incapable of physical-chemical explanation or formation.

== Usage in referring to a type of argument ==
The term God-of-the-gaps fallacy can refer to a position that assumes an act of God as the explanation for an unknown phenomenon, which according to the users of the term, is a variant of an argument from ignorance fallacy. Such an argument is sometimes reduced to the following form:

- There is a gap in understanding of some aspect of the natural world.
- Therefore, the cause must be supernatural.

One example of such an argument, which uses God as an explanation of one of the current gaps in biological science, is as follows: "Because current science can't figure out exactly how life started, it must be God who caused life to start." Critics of intelligent design creationism, for example, have accused proponents of using this basic type of argument.

God-of-the-gaps arguments have been discouraged by some theologians who assert that such arguments tend to relegate God to the leftovers of science: as scientific knowledge increases, the dominion of God decreases.

== Criticism ==
The term was invented as a criticism of people who perceive that God only acts in the gaps, and who restrict God's activity to such "gaps". It has also been argued that the God-of-the-gaps view is predicated on the assumption that any event which can be explained by science automatically excludes God; that if God did not do something via direct action, that he had no role in it at all.

The "God of the gaps" argument, as traditionally advanced by scholarly Christians, was intended as a criticism against weak or tenuous faith, not as a statement against theism or belief in God.

According to John Habgood in The Westminster Dictionary of Christian Theology, the phrase is generally derogatory, and is inherently a direct criticism of a tendency to postulate acts of God to explain phenomena for which science has not (at least at present) given a satisfactory account. Habgood also states:

It is theologically more satisfactory to look for evidence of God's actions within natural processes rather than apart from them, in much the same way that the meaning of a book transcends, but is not independent of, the paper and ink of which it is comprised.

It has been criticized by both theologians and scientists, who say that it is a logical fallacy to base belief in God on gaps in scientific knowledge. In this vein, Richard Dawkins, an atheist, dedicates a chapter of his book The God Delusion to criticism of the God-of-the-gaps argument. He noted that:

Creationists eagerly seek a gap in present-day knowledge or understanding. If an apparent gap is found, it is assumed that God, by default, must fill it. What worries thoughtful theologians such as Bonhoeffer is that gaps shrink as science advances, and God is threatened with eventually having nothing to do and nowhere to hide.

== See also ==
- Deism
- Deus ex machina
- Miracles (book)
- Non-overlapping magisteria
- Watchmaker analogy
- AI effect

== Bibliography ==
- Dietrich Bonhoeffer, Letters and Papers from Prison, New York: Simon & Schuster, 1997 (ISBN 978-0-684-83827-4) "Letter to Eberhard Bethge", 29 May 1944, pages 310–312.
- Richard H. Bube, "Man Come of Age: Bonhoeffer's Response to the God-Of-The-Gaps," Journal of the Evangelical Theological Society, volume 14 fall (1971), pages 203–220.
- C. A. Coulson, Science and Christian Belief (The John Calvin McNair Lectures, 1954), London: Oxford University Press, 1955. Page 20, see also page 28.
- Henry Drummond, The Lowell Lectures on the Ascent of Man, Glasgow: Hodder and Stoughton, 1904 (Chapter 10, containing the relevant text).
