= Bernard Ramm =

American theologian (1916-1992)

Bernard L. Ramm (1 August 1916 in Butte, Montana – 11 August 1992 in Irvine, California) was a Baptist theologian and apologist within the broad evangelical tradition. He wrote prolifically on topics concerned with biblical hermeneutics, religion and science, Christology, and apologetics. The hermeneutical principles presented in his 1956 book Protestant Biblical Interpretation influenced a wide spectrum of Baptist theologians. During the 1970s he was widely regarded as a leading evangelical theologian as well known as Carl F. H. Henry. His equally celebrated and criticized 1954 book The Christian View of Science and Scripture was the theme of a 1979 issue of the Journal of the American Scientific Affiliation, while a 1990 issue of Baylor University's Perspectives in Religious Studies was devoted to Ramm's views on theology.

== Education ==
Ramm initially studied chemistry then switched to philosophy of science in preparation for ministry. His tertiary education included a B.A. (University of Washington), B.D. (Eastern Baptist Seminary), M.A. in 1947 & Ph.D in 1950 (University of Southern California). He undertook additional studies at the University of Pennsylvania, the University of Basel, Switzerland (1957–1958 academic year with Karl Barth), and the Near Eastern School of Theology, Beirut, Lebanon.

== Career ==
His academic teaching career began in 1943, when he joined the faculty at the Bible Institute of Los Angeles (now Biola University, La Mirada, California). He became Professor of Philosophy at Bethel College and Seminary, and then Professor of Religion at Baylor University, Texas. He briefly taught at Eastern Baptist Theological Seminary in Philadelphia. Most of his academic teaching took place at the American Baptist Seminary of the West at Covina, California, where he taught 1958–74 and again 1978-86. At that seminary he held the post of Pearl Rawlings Hamilton Professor of Christian Theology.

== Writings ==
Ramm wrote eighteen books, contributed chapters to other books, and authored over one hundred articles and book reviews that were published in various theological periodicals.

In his contributions to Christian apologetics, Ramm began his career in the evidentialist camp, but his later work reflected a shift in viewpoint to a modified form of presuppositional apologetics that had some affinity with the work of Edward John Carnell. In spite of harsh criticisms of Karl Barth from more traditionally Calvinist apologists such as Cornelius Van Til, Gordon Clark, and Carl F. H. Henry, Ramm would explore much of Barth's theological viewpoint, eventually embracing Barth's theology almost wholeheartedly as outlined in Ramm's own book After Fundamentalism (Harper & Row, 1983).

Ramm did not utilise the classical or Thomist approach in arguments for God's existence. He maintained that apart from faith God was unknowable. He likewise emphasised that the noetic effects of sin rendered theistic proofs useless. In Ramm's view, the proof of God's existence is in Holy Scripture.

He argued that the primary use of apologetic evidences is to create a favourable climate of opinion so that the Gospel may be proclaimed, and believed. In this respect he felt that miracles and fulfilled prophecy provided a factual basis for that climate of opinion. Ramm placed strong emphasis on the inner witness of the Holy Spirit verifying the gospel to the believer.

In some respects Ramm's emphasis on the inner witness of the Spirit reflected the view of John Calvin, but it also reflected the influence of Karl Barth, under whom he studied in Switzerland.

Near the end of his life, Ramm was honored with a book of essays by his colleagues and younger contemporaries.

=== Influence of The Christian View of Science and Scripture ===
In his book, The Christian View of Science and Scripture, published in 1954, he was critical of "flood geology" and the notion of a young earth and influenced the American Scientific Affiliation (ASA) in not supporting "flood geology" during the 1950s before Henry M. Morris and John C. Whitcomb popularised Young Earth creationism and Flood geology in their 1961 book entitled The Genesis Flood.

Reformed theologian Meredith G. Kline, known for advancing the framework interpretation of Genesis cites this book in his influential article "Because It Had Not Rained" after having reviewed it three years earlier, stating "It is, indeed, informative and provocative. Moreover, it has some good emphases. It can, therefore, be read profitably if read critically." yet cautioning "It would be well...for teachers of God's people to be hesitant or, at the least, very careful in providing public documentation of the history of their personal struggle after the truth." Kline also found Ramm's defense of the authority of scripture potentially inconsistent and Ramm's hermeneutical question regarding the place of natural revelation in interpreting scripture while a valid one, his approach in exploring and attempting to answer it done with too much zeal and dangerously close to being error-prone.

The publisher's choice of title, in particular its initial article The Christian View of Science and Scripture, turned out to be a magnet for criticism. Ramm's original title was 'The Evangelical Faith and Modern Science', but the publisher changed this in order for it to be similar to the title of James Orr's 1893 book The Christian View of God and the World.

The year 1979 marked the book's 25th anniversary, which was celebrated by the American Scientific Affiliation in devoting that year's December issue of its journal JASA to Ramm by including evaluations from theologians on the influence of The Christian View of Science and Scripture as well as an interview with Ramm and his wife Alta.

In a survey of Religion and Science books, Covenant Theological Seminary professor and ordained PCA minister C. John Collins called this book "a classic from a conservative evangelical author".

=== Influence of Protestant Christian Evidences ===
His work Protestant Christian Evidences is considered a classic and is still often cited.

Professor Ramm is often quoted for writing the following in his work Protestant Christian Evidences:

Jews preserved it as no other manuscript has ever been preserved. With their massora they kept tabs on every letter, syllable, word, and paragraph. They had special classes of men within their culture whose sole duty was to preserve and transmit these documents with practically perfect fidelity – scribes, lawyers, masoretes.

In regard to the New Testament, there are about 13,000 manuscripts, complete and incomplete, in Greek and other languages, that have survived from antiquity.

A thousand times over, the death knell of the Bible has been sounded, the funeral procession formed, the inscription cut on the tombstone, and committal read. But somehow the corpse never stays put. No other book has been so chopped, knifed, sifted, scrutinized, and vilified. What book on philosophy or religion or psychology or belles lettres of classical or modern times has been subject to such a mass attack as the Bible? With such venom and skepticism? With such thoroughness and erudition? Upon every chapter, line and tenet?

The Bible is still loved by millions, read by millions, and studied by millions.

Ramm also stated, in his often cited work Protestant Christian Evidences, the following:

A historic person named Jesus gave certain men such an impact as to be unequaled by far in the entire annals of the human race. After nearly two thousand years the impact is not at all spent, but daily there are people who have tremendous revolutionary experiences which they associate with Jesus Christ, be He dead or risen in Heaven. The personality of Jesus is without parallel. It is unique and incomparable. Protestant Christian Evidences [Chicago: Moody, 1953], p. 171.

== Selected publications ==
- Problems in Christian Apologetics, Western Baptist Theological Seminary, Portland, Oregon, 1949.
- Protestant Christian Evidences, Moody Press, Chicago, 1953.
- Types of Apologetic Systems, Van Kampen Press, Wheaton, 1953.
- Christian View of Science and Scripture, William B. Eerdmans, Grand Rapids, 1954.
- The Pattern of Authority, William B. Eerdmans, Grand Rapids, 1957.
- The Witness of the Spirit, William B. Eerdmans, Grand Rapids, 1960.
- Special Revelation and the Word of God, William B. Eerdmans, Grand Rapids, 1961.
- Varieties of Christian Apologetics: An Introduction to the Christian Philosophy of Religion, Baker Book House, Grand Rapids, 1962.
- The Christian College in the Twentieth Century, William B. Eerdmans, Grand Rapids, 1963.
- Them He Glorified, William B. Eerdmans, Grand Rapids, 1963.
- A Handbook Of Contemporary Theology, William B. Eermans, Grand Rapids, 1966.
- Protestant Biblical Interpretation: A Textbook of Hermeneutics, 3rd revised edition, Baker Book House, 1970.
- Right, the good and the happy: The Christian in a world of Distorted Values, Word, Waco, 1971.
- The God Who Makes A Difference: A Christian Appeal to Reason, Word, Waco, 1972.
- The Evangelical Heritage, Word, Waco, 1973.
- Rapping About the Spirit, Word, Waco, 1974.
- Devil, Seven Wormwoods, and God, Word, Waco, 1977.
- After Fundamentalism: The Future of Evangelical Theology, Harper & Row, San Francisco, 1983.
- An Evangelical Christology: Ecumenic and Historic, Thomas Nelson, Nashville, 1985.
- Offense to Reason: A Theology of Sin, Harper & Row, San Francisco, 1985.
- God's Way Out: Finding the Road to Personal Freedom Through Exodus (Bible Commentary for Laymen), Regal, Ventura, 1987.
- Ramm and others, Hermeneutics, Baker Book House, Grand Rapids, 1987.

=== Books about ===
- Stanley Grenz (ed). Perspectives on Theology in the Contemporary World: Essays in Honor of Bernard Ramm, Mercer University Press, Macon, Georgia, 1990.

=== Ph.D. Theses about ===
- Bernard Ramm’s reception of Karl Barth’s doctrine of the Word of God by Simon Sze Wang Wat. 2011.
- A critique of Bernard Ramm's doctrine of the Bible by Kenny Regan Pulliam. 1986.
- Scripture and theology an analysis of Bernard Ramm's proposal to adopt Karl Barth's methodology by Robert L Jones. 1985.
- The theological system of Bernard L. Ramm by David Miller. 1982.
- The concept of revelation the theology of Bernard Ramm by R. Alan Day. 1979.

== Additional sources ==
- Kim, Andrew. 2026. Navigating Faith and Science: THe Life and Legacy. Mercer University Press.
