= American Scientific Affiliation =

Christian and scientific organization

- Abbreviation: ASA
- Formation: 1941
- Type: NGO
- Purpose: Christian fellowship among scientists
- Members: 1,500
- President: Janel Curry
- Board Chair: Michael Everest
- Staff: 18
- Website: www.asa3.org

The American Scientific Affiliation (ASA) is a Christian organization of scientists and people in science-related disciplines. The stated purpose is "to investigate any area relating Christian faith and science." The organization publishes a journal, Perspectives on Science and Christian Faith which covers topics related to Christian faith and science from a Christian viewpoint.

Members of the organization are from various movements, such as evangelicalism, and represent several Christian traditions including the Lutherans, Catholics, Methodists, Presbyterians, Baptists, Anabaptists, and the Orthodox.

The organization frequently runs seminars such as at Baylor University, the Faraday Institute for Science and Religion in Cambridge, England, and The Catholic University of America.

== History ==
Scientists who were Christians and had concerns about the quality of Christian evangelism on the subject of religion and science formed the ASA in 1941. Irwin A. Moon originated the idea of a group; he talked Moody Bible Institute president William H. Houghton into inviting a number of scientists with similar Christian views to Chicago to discuss its formation. F. Alton Everest, Peter W. Stoner, Russell D. Sturgis, John P. VanHaitsma, and Irving A. Cowperthwaite attended, and the ASA formed from this meeting.

Everest, a conservative Baptist electrical engineer at Oregon State College in Corvallis, served as president of the Affiliation for its first decade. Under his leadership the ASA grew from 5 to 220 members. By 1961 its membership had grown to 860.

During the 1940s and 1950s the group provided an evangelical forum for discussing the alleged merits and drawbacks of the theory of evolution, and for evaluating the works of prominent creationists such as George McCready Price (1870–1963) and Harry Rimmer (1890–1952). The influence of an inner circle affiliated with Wheaton College led it to reject "strict" creationism in favor first of progressive creationism and then of theistic evolution, encouraging acceptance of evolution among evangelicals. This group was led by Russell L. Mixter (later editor of the Journal of the American Scientific Affiliation from 1965 to 1968) and J. Frank Cassel. In the words of Ronald L. Numbers, the sub-group "did for biology what Kulp was doing for Geology".

=== President (since 2022) / Executive Director (before 2022) ===
- H. Harold Hartzler
- Robert L. Herrmann (1981–1994)
- Donald W. Munro (1994–2005)
- Randall D. Isaac (2005–2016)
- Leslie Wickman (2016–2020)
- John R. Wood (2020–2022)
- Janel Curry (2022–)

=== Executive Vice President (since 2022) / Director of Operations and Development (before 2022) ===
- Vicki L. Best (2018–)

=== Board Chair (since 2022) / Executive Council President (before 2022) ===
- Recent Council Presidents: Terry M. Gray, John R. Wood, Stephen O. Moshier, Lynn Billman, Johnny W. Lin, Keith B. Miller, Harry L. Poe, Robert Kaita, Susan A. Daniels, Jennifer Wiseman, Edward B. Davis, Walter L. Bradley, Ruth D. Miller
- William Jordan (2022)
- Michael Everest (2023–)

== Related organizations ==
The following organizations are related to the ASA: Sister organizations

- Canadian Scientific & Christian Affiliation (CSCA)
- Christians in Science (CiS)

Affiliations

- Christian Women in Science (CWiS)
- Affiliation of Christian Geologists
- Affiliation of Christian Biologists
- Christian Engineers and Scientists in Technology
