= Young Earth creationism =

Form of creationism

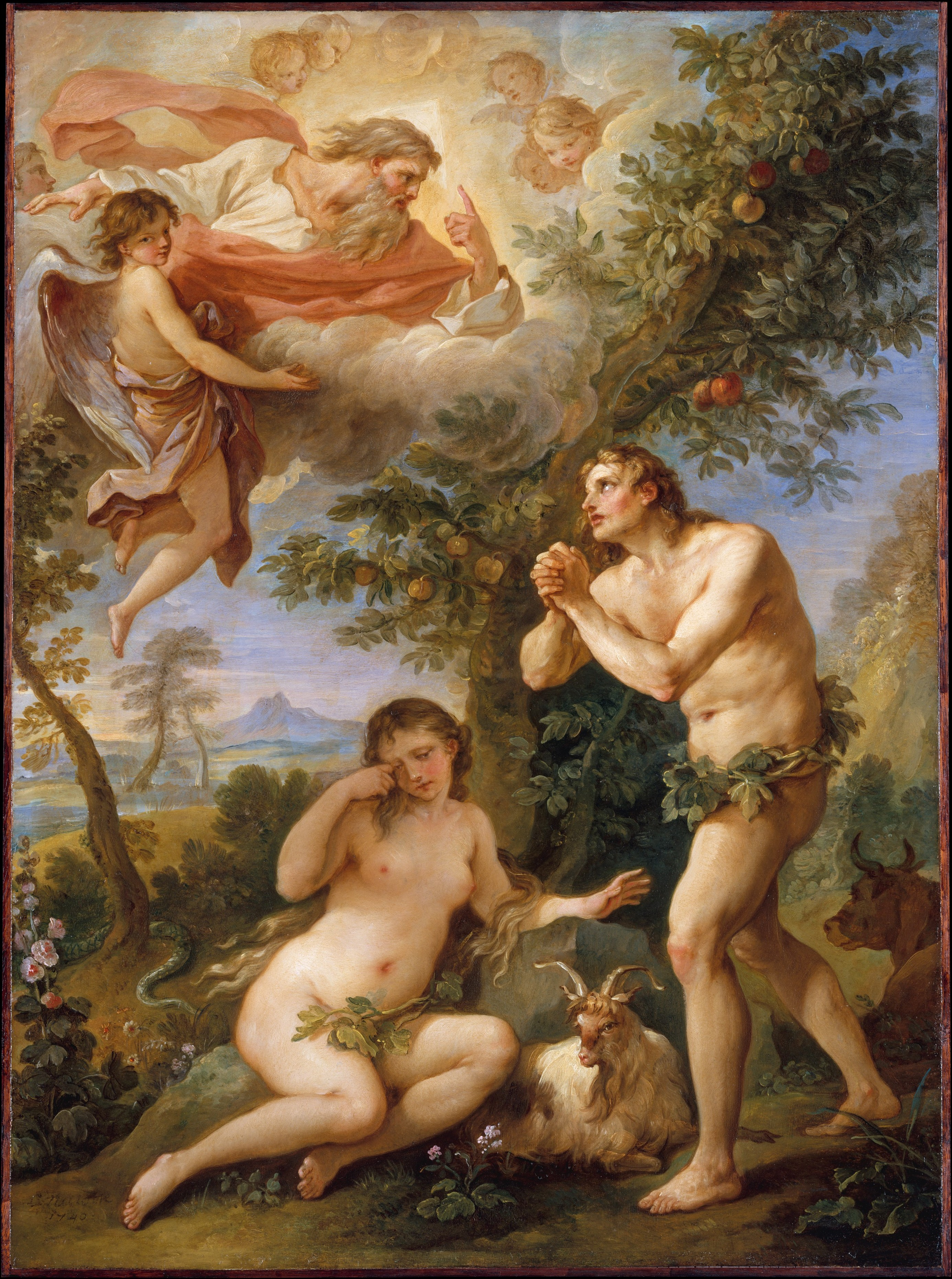
The Rebuke of Adam and Eve, Natoire, 1740

Young Earth creationism (YEC) is a form of creationism. Its central belief is that the Earth and the biosphere were created by various supernatural acts of the Abrahamic God between about 10,000 and 6,000 years ago, directly contradicting established scientific data that puts the age of Earth around 4.54 billion years. Events such as Noah's Flood are described as explaining much of the geological and fossil record. YEC is best described as a religious belief in the inerrancy of certain literal interpretations of the Book of Genesis. The largest young Earth creationist organizations are Answers in Genesis, Institute for Creation Research, and Creation Ministries International.

This is in contrast with old Earth creationism (OEC), which holds that literal interpretations of Genesis are compatible with the scientifically determined ages of the Earth and the universe, and theistic evolution, which posits that scientific principles of evolution, the Big Bang, abiogenesis, solar nebular theory, age of the universe, and age of Earth are compatible with a metaphorical interpretation of the Genesis creation account.

Since the mid-20th century, young Earth creationists—starting with Henry Morris (1918–2006)—developed and promoted a pseudoscientific explanation called creation science as a basis for religious belief in a supernatural, geologically recent creation, in response to scientific acceptance of Charles Darwin's theory of evolution, which was developed over the previous century. Contemporary YEC movements arose, protesting the scientific consensus established by numerous scientific disciplines, which demonstrate that the age of the universe is around 13.8 billion years, the formation of the Earth and Solar System happened around 4.6 billion years ago, and the origin of life occurred roughly 4 billion years ago.

YEC remains influential in some Christian fundamentalist circles, especially in the United States, where it continues to shape debates on science education, biblical interpretation, and the relationship between faith and science. A 2017 Gallup creationism survey found 38 percent of adults in the US held a view that "God created humans in their present form at some time within the last 10,000 years or so" when asked for their views on the origin and development of human beings; Gallup noted this was the lowest in 35 years. It was suggested the support level may be lower when poll results are adjusted after comparison with other polls that have questions which more specifically account for uncertainty and ambivalence. In 2019 Gallup found, when asking a similar question, that 40 percent of US adults held a creationist view.

== Background and history ==
=== Biblical dates for creation ===
Young Earth creationists claim their view has its earliest roots in medieval Judaism, citing, for example, a commentary on Genesis by Ibn Ezra (c. 1089–1164). That said, Shai Cherry of Vanderbilt University notes that modern Jewish theologians generally reject such literal interpretations of the written text, and that Jewish commentators who oppose some aspects of science generally accept scientific evidence that the Earth is much older. Some controversy arose among Ultra-Orthodox Jews, some of whom accept the age and some reject it. Several early Jewish scholars, including Philo, followed an allegorical interpretation of Genesis.

The most accepted and popular date of creation among young Earth creationists is 4004 BC because this date appears in the Ussher chronology. This chronology was included in many Bibles from 1701 onwards, including the authorized King James Version. The youngest ever recorded creation date in historic Jewish or Christian traditions is 3616 BC, by Yom-Tov Lipmann-Muhlhausen. Some proponents of young Earth creationism propose dates several thousands of years earlier, by theorizing significant gaps in genealogies in chapters 5 and 11 of the Book of Genesis, e.g. 6984 BC by Alfonso X of Castile, Harold Camping with 11,013 BC, and Christian Charles Josias Bunsen in the 19th century suggesting 20,000 BC.

The Protestant Reformation hermeneutic inclined some Reformers, including John Calvin and Martin Luther, and later Protestants, toward a literal reading of the Bible as translated. They believed that "days" referred to in Genesis correspond to ordinary days, in contrast to reading "days" as representing longer periods of time.

Famous poets and playwrights of the Early Modern Period (1500–1800) referenced an Earth that was a few thousand years old. For example William Shakespeare:

...The poor world is almost 6,000 years old.

Theophilus of Antioch, writing in the 2nd century, reckoned that "All the years from the creation of the world amount to a total of 5698 years".

=== Scientific Revolution and the old Earth ===
Beginning in the 18th century, support for a young Earth declined among scientists and philosophers. New knowledge included discoveries of the Scientific Revolution and philosophies of the Age of Enlightenment. In particular, discoveries in geology required an Earth that was much older than thousands of years, and proposals such as Abraham Gottlob Werner's Neptunism attempted to incorporate what was understood from geological investigations into a coherent description of the Earth's natural history. James Hutton, now regarded as the father of modern geology, went further and opened up the concept of deep time for scientific inquiry. Rather than assuming that Earth was deteriorating from a primal state, he maintained that the Earth was infinitely old. Hutton stated:

the past history of our globe must be explained by what can be seen to be happening now … No powers are to be employed that are not natural to the globe, no action to be admitted except those of which we know the principle.

Hutton's main line of argument was that the tremendous displacements and changes he was seeing did not happen in a short period of time by means of catastrophe, but that incremental processes of uplift and erosion happening on Earth had caused them. These processes were very gradual, hence Earth had to be ancient, in order to allow time for the changes to occur. While his ideas of Plutonism were hotly contested, scientific inquiries on competing ideas of catastrophism pushed back the age of the Earth into the millions of years – still much younger than commonly accepted by modern scientists, but much older than the young Earth of less than 10,000 years in which Biblical literalists believed.

Hutton's ideas, called uniformitarianism or gradualism, were popularized by Sir Charles Lyell in the early 19th century. The energetic advocacy and rhetoric of Lyell led to the public and scientific communities, largely accepting an ancient Earth. By this time, Reverends William Buckland, Adam Sedgwick and other early geologists had abandoned their ideas of catastrophism related to a biblical flood and confined their explanations to local floods. By the 1830s, the scientific consensus had abandoned a young Earth as a serious hypothesis.

John H. Mears was one of several biblical scholars proposing Biblical interpretations ranging from a series of long or indefinite periods interspersed with moments of creation to a day-age theory of indefinite 'days'. He subscribed to the latter theory (indefinite days) finding support from Yale professor James Dwight Dana, one of the fathers of mineralogy, who wrote a paper consisting of four articles named 'Science and the Bible'. Many biblical scholars reinterpreted Genesis 1 in light of Lyell's geological results, supported by a number of renowned (Christian) scientific scholars. Developmentalism, a form of theistic evolution based on Darwin's Natural selection, grew in acceptance.

This 19th century trend was contested. The scriptural geologists and founders of Victoria Institute opposed the decline of support for a biblically literal young Earth.

=== Christian fundamentalism and belief in a young Earth ===
The rise of fundamentalist Christianity early in the 20th century brought rejection of evolution among fundamentalists who explained an ancient Earth through belief in the gap or in the day-age interpretation of Genesis. In 1923, George McCready Price, a Seventh-day Adventist, wrote The New Geology, a book partly inspired by the book Patriarchs and Prophets, in which Seventh-day Adventist prophet Ellen G. White described the impact of the Great Flood on the shape of the Earth. Although not an accredited geologist, Price's writings, based on reading geological texts and documents rather than field or laboratory work, provide an explicitly fundamentalist perspective on geology. The book attracted a small following. Its advocates were mainly Lutheran pastors and Seventh-day Adventists in the US. Price became popular with fundamentalists for opposition to evolution, although they continued to believe in an ancient Earth.

In the 1950s, Price's work came under severe criticism, particularly by Bernard Ramm in his book The Christian View of Science and Scripture. With J. Laurence Kulp, a geologist, and in fellowship with the Plymouth Brethren and other scientists, Ramm influenced Christian organizations such as the American Scientific Affiliation (ASA) in not supporting flood geology.

Price's work was subsequently adapted and updated by Henry M. Morris and John C. Whitcomb Jr. in a book The Genesis Flood in 1961. Morris and Whitcomb argued that Earth was geologically recent and the Great Flood had laid down most of the geological strata in the space of a single year, reviving pre-uniformitarian arguments. Given this history, they argued, "the last refuge of the case for evolution immediately vanishes away, and the record of the rocks becomes a tremendous witness... to the holiness and justice and power of the living God of Creation!"

This became the foundation of a new generation of young Earth creationist believers, who organized themselves around Morris' Institute for Creation Research. Sister organizations such as the Creation Research Society sought to re-interpret geological formations from a young Earth creationist viewpoint. Langdon Gilkey writes:

... no distinction is made between scientific theories on the one hand and philosophical or religious theories on the other, between scientific questions and the sorts of questions religious beliefs seek to answer... It is, therefore, no surprise that in their theological works, as opposed to their creation science writings, creationists regard evolution and all other theories associated with it, as the intellectual source for and intellectual justification of everything that is to them evil and destructive in modern society. For them all that is spiritually healthy and creative has been for a century or more under attack by "that most complex of godless movements spawned by the pervasive and powerful system of evolutionary uniformitarianism", "If the system of flood geology can be established on a sound scientific basis... then the entire evolutionary cosmology, at least in its present neo-Darwinian form, will collapse. This in turn would mean that every anti-Christian system and movement (communism, racism, humanism, libertarianism, behaviorism, and all the rest) would be deprived of their pseudo-intellectual foundation", "It [evolution] has served effectively as the pseudo-scientific basis of atheism, agnosticism, socialism, fascism, and numerous faulty and dangerous philosophies over the past century.

=== Impact ===
A 2006 joint statement of InterAcademy Panel on International Issues (IAP) by 68 national and international science academies enumerated many of the scientific facts that young Earth creationism contradicts, in particular that the universe, the Earth, and life are billions of years old, that each has undergone continual change over those billions of years, and that life on Earth has evolved from a common primordial origin into the diverse forms observed in the fossil record and present today. Evolutionary theory remains the only explanation that fully accounts for all the observations, measurements, data, and evidence discovered in the fields of biology, ecology, anatomy, physiology, zoology, paleontology, molecular biology, genetics, anthropology, and others.

Hence, young Earth creationism is dismissed by the academic and scientific communities. A 1987 estimate found that only "700 scientists ... (out of a total of 480,000 US earth and life scientists) ... give credence to creation-science". An expert in the evolution-creationism controversy, professor and author Brian Alters, states that "99.9% of scientists accept evolution". A 1991 Gallup poll found that about 5 percent of American scientists (including those with training outside biology) identified themselves as creationists. For their part, young Earth creationists claim lack of support for their beliefs by the scientific community is due to discrimination and censorship by professional science journals and professional science organizations. This viewpoint was explicitly rejected in rulings from the 1981 United States District Court case McLean v. Arkansas Board of Education; no witness was able to produce any articles that had been refused publication and the judge could not conceive how "a loose knit group of independent thinkers in all the varied fields of science could, or would, so effectively censor new scientific thought". A 1985 study also found that only 18 out of 135,000 submissions to scientific journals advocated creationism.

Morris' ideas had a considerable impact on creationism and fundamentalist Christianity. Backed by conservative organizations and individuals, his brand of "creation science" was widely promoted throughout the US and overseas, with his books translated into over ten languages. The inauguration of so-called "young Earth creationism" as a religious position has, on occasion, impacted science education in the US, where periodic controversies rage over the appropriateness of teaching YEC doctrine and creation science in public schools (see Teach the Controversy) alongside or in replacement of the theory of evolution. Young Earth creationism has not impacted less literalist circles of Christianity as widely. Some churches, such as the Roman Catholic Church and Eastern Orthodox churches, accede to the possibility of theistic evolution; individual church members may support young Earth creationism without those churches' explicit condemnation.

Views on human evolution in various countries

Adherence to young Earth creationism and rejection of evolution is higher in the US than in most of the rest of the Western world. A 2024 Gallup survey reported 37 percent of Americans believed in a creationist view, that God created humans in their present form at one time within the last 10,000 years, a statistic which has dropped from 47 percent in 2012; for those with a college degree, only 26 percent believed in the young Earth creationist viewpoint. About a third of Americans believed humans evolved with God's guidance and 24 percent said humans evolved but God had no part in the process. Most of the drop in belief of creationism occurred between 2012 and 2017 when the Gallup creationism survey found 38 percent of adults in the US were inclined to the view that "God created humans in their present form at one time within the last 10,000 years". A 2009 poll by Harris Interactive found 39 percent of Americans agreed with the statement: "God created the universe, the earth, the sun, moon, stars, plants, animals, and the first two people within the past 10,000 years", yet only 18 percent of Americans polled agreed with the statement "The earth is less than 10,000 years old".

Reasons for the higher rejection of evolution in the US include the abundance of fundamentalist Christians compared to Europe. A 2011 Gallup survey reported 30 percent of Americans said the Bible is the actual word of God and should be interpreted literally, a statistic that had fallen slightly from the late 1970s. Some 54 percent of those who attended church weekly and 46 percent of those with high school education or less took the Bible literally.

== Characteristics and beliefs ==
A common belief of young Earth creationists is that Earth and life were created in six 24-hour periods, 6,000–10,000 years ago. However, there are different approaches to how this is possible given geological evidence for much longer timescales. The Science Education Resource Center at Carleton College has identified two major types of YEC belief systems:

- Believers in flood geology attach great importance to the biblical story of Noah's Flood to explain the fossil record and geological strata. Major American YEC organizations like the Institute for Creation Research and Answers in Genesis support this approach, with detailed argumentation and references to scientific evidence, though these are often framed with pseudoscientific misconceptions.
- A less-visible form of YEC, not seen as often on the internet, claims that there has been essentially no development of the Universe, Earth, or life whatsoever since creation—that creation has been in a steady state since the beginning without major changes. According to Ronald Numbers, this belief, which does not necessarily try to explain scientific evidence by referring to a global flood, is not promoted as much as the former example given. Such YECs believe fossils are not real and major extinctions never occurred, hence dinosaurs, trilobites, and other examples of extinct organisms found in the fossil record would have to either be hoaxes or simply secular lies, promoted perhaps by the devil.

=== View of the Bible ===
Young Earth creationists regard the Bible as a historically accurate, factually inerrant record of natural history. As Henry Morris, a leading young Earth creationist, explained it, "Christians who flirt with less-than-literal readings of biblical texts are also flirting with theological disaster." According to Morris, Christians must "either ... believe God's Word all the way, or not at all." Young Earth creationists consider the account of creation given in Genesis to be a factual record of the origin of the Earth and life, and that Bible-believing Christians must therefore regard Genesis 1–11 as historically accurate.

==== Interpretations of Genesis ====
Young Earth creationists interpret the text of Genesis as strictly literal. They reject allegorical readings of Genesis and further argue that if there was not a literal Fall of Man, Noah's Ark, or Tower of Babel, core Christian doctrines like the birth and resurrection of Jesus Christ would be undermined.

Genealogies in Genesis record the line of descent from Adam through Noah to Abraham. Young Earth creationists interpret these genealogies literally, including the old ages of the men. For example, Methuselah lived 969 years according to the genealogy. Differences of opinion exist regarding whether the genealogies should be taken as complete or abbreviated, hence the 6,000 to 10,000 year range usually quoted for the Earth's age. (Little discussion is apparent as yet as to whether 'years' in Genesis could refer to a different time span than that of the Gregorian calendar.) In contrast, Old Earth Creationists tend to interpret the genealogies as incomplete, and usually interpret the days of Genesis 1 figuratively as long periods of time.

Young Earth creationists believe the flood described in Genesis 6–9 did occur, was global in extent, and submerged all dry land on Earth. Some young Earth creationists go further and advocate a flood geology, which relies on the appropriation of late eighteenth and early nineteenth century arguments in favor of catastrophism made by such scientists as Georges Cuvier and Richard Kirwan. This approach, which was replaced by the mid-nineteenth century almost entirely by uniformitarianism, was adopted most famously by George McCready Price and this legacy is reflected in the most prominent YEC organizations today. YEC ideas developed to accommodate the massive amount of water necessary for a flood on a global scale included inventing such constructs as an orbiting vapor canopy which would have collapsed and generated the necessary extreme rainfall or a rapid movement of tectonic plates causing underground aquifers or tsunamis from underwater volcanic steam to inundate the planet.

=== Age of the Earth ===
The young Earth creationist belief that the age of the Earth is 6,000 to 10,000 years old conflicts with the age of 4.54 billion years measured using independently cross-validated geochronological methods including radiometric dating. Creationists dispute these and all other methods which demonstrate the timescale of geologic history, in spite of their lack of scientific evidence to support any assertion that there are any inconsistencies or errors in the measurement of the Earth's age.

Between 1997 and 2005, a team of scientists at the Institute for Creation Research conducted an eight-year research project entitled RATE (Radioisotopes and the Age of The Earth) to assess the validity and accuracy of radiometric dating techniques. While they concluded that 'overwhelming evidence' demonstrated over 500 million years' worth of radioactive decay, they nevertheless claimed to have found other 'scientific evidence' to prove a young Earth. They therefore proposed that nuclear decay rates were accelerated by a factor of one billion during the Creation week and at the time of the Flood. However, when subjected to independent scrutiny by non-affiliated experts, their analyses were shown to be flawed.

=== Human history ===
Young Earth creationists reject almost all the results of physical anthropology and human evolution and instead insist that Adam and Eve were the universal ancestors of every human to have ever lived. Noah's flood as reported in the book of Genesis is said to have killed all humans on Earth with the exception of Noah and his sons and their wives. Hence young Earth creationists also argue that all humans alive today are descended from this single family.

Their literal belief that the world's linguistic variety originated with the tower of Babel is pseudoscientific, sometimes called pseudolinguistics, and it is contrary to what is known about the origin and history of languages.

=== Flood geology, the fossil record, and dinosaurs ===
Young Earth creationists reject geologic evidence which shows that the stratigraphic sequence of fossils proves the Earth is billions of years old. In his Illogical Geology, expanded in 1913 as The Fundamentals of Geology, George McCready Price argued that the occasionally out-of-order sequence of fossils that are shown to be due to thrust faults made it impossible to prove any one fossil was older than any other. His "law" that fossils could be found in any order implied that strata could not be dated sequentially. He instead proposed that essentially all fossils were buried during the flood, and thus inaugurated "flood geology". In numerous books and articles he promoted this concept, focusing his attack on the sequence of the geologic time scale as "the devil's counterfeit of the six days of Creation as recorded in the first chapter of Genesis." Today, many young Earth creationists still contend that the fossil record can be explained by the global flood.

In The Genesis Flood (1961) Henry M. Morris reiterated Price's arguments, and wrote that, because there had been no death before the Fall of Man, he felt "compelled to date all the rock strata which contain fossils of once-living creatures as subsequent to Adam's fall", attributing most to the flood. He added that humans and dinosaurs had lived together, quoting Clifford L. Burdick for the report that dinosaur tracks had supposedly been found overlapping a human track in the Paluxy River bed Glen Rose Formation. He was subsequently advised that he might have been misled, and Burdick wrote to Morris in September 1962 that "you kind of stuck your neck out in publishing those Glen Rose tracks." In the third printing of the book this section was removed.

Following in this vein, many young Earth creationists, especially those associated with the more visible organizations, do not deny the existence of dinosaurs and other extinct animals present in the fossil record. Usually, they claim that fossils represent the remains of animals that perished in the flood. A number of creationist organizations further propose that Noah took dinosaurs with him in the ark, and that they only began to disappear as a result of a different post-flood environment. The Creation Museum in Kentucky portrays humans and dinosaurs coexisting before the Flood while the California roadside attraction Cabazon Dinosaurs describes dinosaurs as being created the same day as Adam and Eve. The Creation Evidence Museum in Glen Rose, Texas, has a "hyperbaric biosphere" intended to reproduce atmospheric conditions before the Flood which could grow dinosaurs. The proprietor Carl Baugh says that these conditions made creatures grow larger and live longer, so that humans of that time were giants.

The term dinosaur was coined by Richard Owen in 1842. Some creationist organizations propose that the Hebrew word tanniyn (תנין, pronounced [tanˈnin]), mentioned nearly thirty times in the Old Testament, should be considered a synonym. In English translations, tanniyn has been translated as "sea monster" or "serpent", but most often it is translated as "dragon". Additionally, in the Book of Job, a "behemoth" (Job 40:15–24) is described as a creature that "moves his tail like a cedar"; the behemoth is described as ranking "first among the works of God" and impossible to capture (vs. 24). Biblical scholars alternatively identified the behemoth as either an elephant, a hippopotamus, or a bull, but some creationists identified the behemoth with sauropod dinosaurs, often specifically the Brachiosaurus according to their interpretation of the verse "He is the chief of the ways of God" implying that the behemoth is the largest animal God created. The leviathan is another creature referred to in the Bible's Old Testament that some creationists argue is actually a dinosaur or prehistoric marine reptile such as a mosasaur. Alternatively, more mainstream scholars identified the Leviathan (Job 41) with the Nile crocodile or, because Ugarit texts describe it as having seven heads, a purely mythical beast similar to the Lernaean Hydra.

A subset of adherents of the pseudoscience of cryptozoology promote young Earth creationism, particularly in the context of so-called "living dinosaurs". Science writer Sharon A. Hill observes that the young Earth creationist segment of cryptozoology is "well-funded and able to conduct expeditions with a goal of finding a living dinosaur that they think would invalidate evolution." Anthropologist Jeb J. Card says: "Creationists have embraced cryptozoology and some cryptozoological expeditions are funded by and conducted by creationists hoping to disprove evolution." Young Earth creationists occasionally claim dinosaurs survived in Australia, and that Aboriginal legends of reptilian monsters are evidence of this, referring to what is known as Megalania (Varanus priscus). However, Megalania was a gigantic species of monitor lizard, not a dinosaur, as its discoverer, Richard Owen, realised that the skeletal remains were that of a lizard, not an archosaur. Some creationists believe Mokele-mbembe, a cryptid said to dwell deep in the Congo rainforest, may be a living sauropod, though the scientific consensus is that this is extremely unlikely.

In a 2019 issue of Skeptical Inquirer, science author Philip J. Senter details many 16th and 17th century hoaxes who constructed composite dragons, which Senter calls the "Piltdown Men of Creationism" stating that many young Earth creationists believe these hoaxes even though "the fakes don't even resemble the very animals the creationist authors claim they are". Other more recent hoaxes such as the Cardiff Giant, Silverbell artifacts, Burdick tracks and Acámbaro figures are still cited as proof of a young earth, even though some of the hoaxers confessed. Young Earth creationists according to Senter are quick to point out embarrassing forgeries that some scientists believed for years, such as the Piltdown Man. Senter continues, "it is also somewhat hypocritical, for the YEC literature is replete with cases in which its own authors have fallen for taxidermic 'dragon' hoaxes".

=== Geocentrism ===
There exists an even more radical Geocentric creationist view within Young Earth Creationism, which in addition to proposing that the Earth is around 6000 years old, argues that the geocentric view of cosmology, particularly the Tychonic model should be accepted, which seriously contradicts scientifically established data on the movement of the Earth. This view was proposed by some early Creationist literature, and as early as 1985 some in the Creation Research Society supported Geocentrism. Geocentrism has been associated with creationists such as Gerardus Bouw, Robert Sungenis and Walter Van der Kamp who founded the Tychonic society. It is primarily followed by a small segment of Protestant and Catholic fundamentalists alongside a few Orthodox Jews, but is fringe within even Creationism itself.

Both mainstream creationists and geocentrists agree that while the Bible is the only completely reliable source of information for knowledge on the natural world, they strongly differ on their understanding of scripture. While some creationists such as Kent Hovind initially had a neutral opinion of geocentrism, the majority of the creationist movement strongly rejected geocentrism, including major organizations such as Answers in Genesis, Institute for Creation Research and Creation Ministries International. These organizations avoid association with Geocentric movements, as they believe these movements to be harmful to Christianity.

=== Attitude towards science ===
Young Earth creationism is most famous for opposition to the theory of evolution, but believers also are on record opposing many measurements, facts, and principles in fields of physics and chemistry, and dating methods including radiometric dating, geology, astronomy, cosmology, and paleontology. Young Earth creationists do not accept any explanations for natural phenomena that deviate from a literal or plain reading of the Bible, whether it be the origins of biological diversity, the origins of life, the geological, atmospheric, and oceanic history of Earth, the origins of the Solar System and Earth, formation of the earliest chemical elements or the origins of the universe itself. This has led some young Earth creationists to criticize other creationist proposals such as intelligent design, for not taking a strong stand on the age of the Earth, special creation, or even the identity of the designer.

Young Earth creationists disagree with methodological naturalism, which is part of the scientific method. Instead, they assert that actions of God as described in the Bible occurred as written, and therefore only 'scientific evidence' that points to the Bible being correct can be accepted. See Creation–evolution controversy for a more complete discussion.

== Compared to other forms of creationism ==
As a position that developed out of the explicitly anti-intellectual side of the Fundamentalist–Modernist Controversy in the early twentieth century, there is no single unified nor consistent consensus on how creationism as a belief system ought to reconcile adherents' acceptance of biblical inerrancy with empirical facts of the Universe. Although young Earth creationism is one of the most stridently literalist positions taken among professed creationists, there are also examples of biblical literalist adherents to both geocentrism and a flat Earth. Conflicts between different kinds of creationists are rather common. Three in particular are of special relevance to YEC, being: Old Earth Creationism, Gap creationism, and the Omphalos hypothesis.

=== Old Earth creationism ===
Young Earth creationists reject old Earth creationism and day-age creationism on textual and theological grounds. In addition, they claim that scientific data in geology and astronomy point to a young Earth, against the consensus of the general scientific community.

Young Earth creationists generally hold that, when Genesis describes the creation of the Earth occurring over a period of days, this indicates normal-length 24-hour days, and cannot reasonably be interpreted otherwise. They agree that the Hebrew word for "day" (yôm) can refer to either a 24-hour day or a long or unspecified time; but argue that, whenever the latter interpretation is used, it includes a preposition defining the long or unspecified period. In the specific context of Genesis 1, since the days are both numbered and are referred to as "evening and morning", this can mean only normal-length days. Further, they argue that the 24-hour day is the only interpretation that makes sense of the Sabbath command in Exodus 20:8–11. YECs argue that it is a glaring exegetical fallacy to take a meaning from one context (yom referring to a long period of time in Genesis 1) and apply it to a completely different one (yom referring to normal-length days in Exodus 20).

Hebrew scholars reject the rule that yôm with a number or an "evening and morning" construct can only refer to 24-hour days. Hugh Ross pointed out that the earliest reference to this rule dates back to 1970s young Earth creationist literature and that no reference to it exists independent of the young Earth movement.

=== Gap creationism ===
The "gap theory" acknowledges a vast age for the universe, including the Earth and solar system, while asserting that life was created recently in six 24-hour days by divine fiat. Genesis 1 is thus interpreted literally, with an indefinite "gap" of time inserted between the first two verses. (Some gap theorists insert a "primordial creation" and Lucifer's rebellion into the gap.) Young Earth creationist organizations argue that gap theory is unscriptural, unscientific, and not necessary, in its various forms.

=== Omphalos hypothesis ===
Many young Earth creationists distinguish their own hypotheses from the "Omphalos hypothesis", today more commonly referred to as the apparent age concept, put forth by the naturalist and science writer Philip Henry Gosse. Omphalos was an unsuccessful mid-19th century attempt to reconcile creationism with geology. Gosse proposed that just as Adam had a navel (omphalos is Greek for navel), evidence of a gestation he never experienced, so also the Earth was created ex nihilo complete with evidence of a prehistoric past that never actually occurred. The Omphalos hypothesis allows for a young Earth without giving rise to any predictions that would contradict scientific findings of an old Earth. Although both logically unassailable and consistent with a literal reading of scripture, Omphalos was rejected at the time by scientists on the grounds that it was completely unfalsifiable and by theologians because it implied to them a deceitful God, which they found theologically unacceptable.

Today, in contrast to Gosse, young Earth creationists posit that not only is the Earth young but that the scientific data supports that view. However, the apparent age concept is still used in young Earth creationist literature. There are examples of young Earth creationists arguing that Adam did not have a navel.

== Criticism ==
Young Earth creationists adhere strongly to a concept of biblical inerrancy, and regard the Bible as divinely inspired and "infallible and completely authoritative on all matters with which they deal, free from error of any sort, scientific and historical as well as moral and theological".

Young Earth creationists also suggest that supporters of modern scientific understanding with which they disagree are primarily motivated by atheism. Critics reject this claim by pointing out that many supporters of evolutionary theory are religious believers, and that major religious groups, such as the Roman Catholic Church, the Eastern Orthodox Church, the Anglican Communion and mainline Protestant churches, believe that concepts such as physical cosmology, chemical origins of life, biological evolution, and geological fossil records do not imply a rejection of the scriptures. Critics also point out that workers in fields related to biology, chemistry, physics, or geosciences are not required to sign statements of belief in contemporary science comparable to the biblical inerrancy pledges required by creationist organizations, contrary to the creationist claim that scientists operate on an a priori disbelief in biblical principles.

Creationists also discount certain modern Christian theological positions, like those of French Jesuit priest, geologist and paleontologist Pierre Teilhard de Chardin, who saw that his work with evolutionary sciences actually confirmed and inspired his faith in the cosmic Christ; or those of Thomas Berry, a cultural historian and ecotheologian, that the cosmological 13-billion-year "Universe Story" provides all faiths and all traditions with a single account by which the divine has made its presence in the world.

Proponents of young Earth creationism are regularly accused of quote mining, the practice of isolating passages from academic texts that appear to support their claims, while deliberately excluding context and conclusions to the contrary. For example, scientists acknowledge that there are indeed a number of mysteries about the Universe left to be solved, and scientists actively working in the fields who identify inconsistencies or problems with extant models, when pressed, explicitly reject creationist interpretations. Theologians and philosophers have also criticized this "God of the gaps" viewpoint.

In defending against young Earth creationist attacks on "evolutionism" and "Darwinism", scientists and skeptics have offered rejoinders that every challenge made by proponents of YEC is either made in an unscientific fashion, or is readily explainable by science.

=== Theological considerations ===
Few modern theologians take the Genesis account of creation literally. Even many Christian evangelicals who reject the notion of purely naturalistic Darwinian evolution often treat the story as a nonliteral saga, as poetry, or as liturgical literature.

Genesis contains two accounts of the Creation: in chapter 1 man was created after the animals (Genesis 1:24–26), while in chapter 2 man was created (Genesis 2:7) before the animals (Genesis 2:19). Proponents of the Documentary hypothesis suggest that Genesis 1 was a litany from the Priestly source (possibly from an early Jewish liturgy), while Genesis 2 was assembled from older Jahwist material, holding that, for both stories to be a single account, Adam would have named all the animals, and God would have created Eve from his rib as a suitable mate, all within a single 24 hour period. Creationists responding to this point attribute the view to misunderstanding having arisen from poor translation of the tenses in Genesis 2 in contemporary translations of the Bible (e.g. compare "planted" and "had planted" in the King James Version and New International Version).

Some Christians assert that the Bible is free from error only in religious and moral matters, and that, where scientific or historic questions are concerned, the Bible should not be read literally. This position is held by a number of major denominations. For instance, in a publication entitled The Gift of Scripture, the Roman Catholic Church in England and Wales comments that, "We should not expect to find in Scripture full scientific accuracy or complete historical precision". The Bible is held to be true in passages relating to human salvation, but, "We should not expect total accuracy from the Bible in other, secular matters". While the Catholic Church teaches that the Bible's message is without error, it does not consider it always to be literal. By contrast, young Earth creationists contend that moral and spiritual matters in the Bible are intimately connected with its historical accuracy; in their view, the Bible stands or falls as a single indivisible block of 'knowledge'.

Christian and Jewish theology actually has a long story of not interpreting the Genesis creation narrative literally: already in the 2nd century CE, Christian theologian and apologist Origen wrote that it was inconceivable to consider Genesis literal history, while Augustine of Hippo (4th century CE) argued that God created everything in the universe in the same instant, and not in six days as a plain reading of Genesis would require; even earlier, 1st-century CE Jewish scholar Philo wrote that it would be a mistake to think that creation happened in six days or in any determinate amount of time.

Aside from the theological doubts voiced by other Christians, young Earth creationism also stands in opposition to the creation mythologies of other religions (both extant and extinct). Many of these make claims regarding the origin of the Universe and humanity that are completely incompatible with those of Christian creationists (and with one another). Marshaling support for the Judeo-Christian creation myth versus other creation myths after having rejected much of the scientific evidence is largely, then, done on the basis of accepting on faith the veracity of the biblical account rather than the alternative.

=== Scientific refutation ===
The overwhelming majority of scientists reject young Earth creationism. Around the start of the 19th century mainstream science abandoned the concept that the Earth was younger than millions of years. Measurements of archeological, astrophysical, biological, chemical, cosmological, and geological timescales differ from YEC's estimates of the Earth's age by up to five orders of magnitude (that is, by a factor of a hundred thousand times). Scientific estimates of the age of the earliest pottery discovered at 20,000 BCE, the oldest known trees before 9,400 BCE, ice cores up to 800,000 years old, and layers of silt deposit in Lake Suigetsu at 52,800 years old, are all significantly older than YEC estimate of the Earth's age. YEC's theories are further contradicted by scientists' ability to observe galaxies billions of light years away.

The scientific community generally regards claims that YEC has a scientific basis to be religiously motivated pseudoscience, because young Earth creationists only look for evidence to support their preexisting belief that the Bible is a literal description of the development of the universe. In 1997, a poll by the Gallup organization showed that only 5 percent of US adults with professional degrees in science took a young Earth creationist view. In the same poll, 40 percent of the same group said they believed that life, including humans, had evolved over millions of years, but that God guided this process, a view described as theistic evolution, while 55 percent held a view of "naturalistic evolution" in which no God took part in this process. Some scientists (such as Hugh Ross and Gerald Schroeder) who believe in creationism are known to subscribe to other forms, such as day-age creationism and progressive creationism, which posit an act of creation that took place millions or billions of years ago, with variations on the timing of the creation of mankind.

Chemist Paul Braterman has argued that young Earth creationism "bears all the hallmarks of a conspiracy theory" by "offering a complete parallel universe with its own organisations and rules of evidence, and claims that the scientific establishment promoting evolution is an arrogant and morally corrupt elite", adding that "This so-called elite supposedly conspires to monopolise academic employment and research grants. Its alleged objective is to deny divine authority, and the ultimate beneficiary and prime mover is Satan."

== Adhering church bodies ==
- Amish Mennonites
- Communion of Reformed Evangelical Churches
- Evangelical Lutheran Synod
- Lutheran Church – Missouri Synod
- Protestant Reformed Churches in America
- Seventh-day Adventist Church
- Wisconsin Evangelical Lutheran Synod

== See also ==
- Antediluvian
- Biblical cosmology
- Chronology of the Bible
- Chronology of the universe
- Cosmogony
- Cosmological argument
- Creator deity
- Generations of Noah
- Geoscience Research Institute
- Higher criticism
- History of creationism
- International Conference on Creationism
- Theism
