= Definition of religion =

The definition of religion is a controversial and complicated subject in religious studies with scholars failing to agree on any one definition. Oxford Dictionaries defines religion as the belief in and/or worship of a superhuman controlling power, especially a personal God or gods. Others, such as Wilfred Cantwell Smith, have tried to correct a perceived Western bias in the definition and study of religion. Thinkers such as Daniel Dubuisson have doubted that the term religion has any meaning outside of Western cultures, while others, such as Ernst Feil doubt that it has any specific, universal meaning even there.

== Competing definitions ==
Scholars have failed to agree on a definition of religion. There are however two general definition systems: the sociological/functional and the phenomenological/philosophical.

- Emile Durkheim defined religion as "a unified system of beliefs and practices relative to sacred things, that is to say things set apart and forbidden—beliefs and practices which unite into one single moral community called a church, all those who adhere to them."
- Max Lynn Stackhouse, defined religion as "a comprehensive worldview or 'metaphysical moral vision' that is accepted as binding because it is held to be in itself basically true and just even if all dimensions of it cannot be either fully confirmed or refuted".

Some jurisdictions refuse to classify specific religions as religions, arguing that they are instead heresies, even if they are widely viewed as a religion in the academic world.

=== Modern Western ===
Religion is a modern Western concept. Parallel concepts are not found in many current and past cultures; there is no equivalent term for religion in many languages. Scholars have found it difficult to develop a consistent definition, with some giving up on the possibility of a definition. Others argue that regardless of its definition, it is not appropriate to apply it to non-Western cultures.

An increasing number of scholars have expressed reservations about ever defining the essence of religion. They observe that the way we use the concept today is a particularly modern construct that would not have been understood through much of history and in many cultures outside the West (or even in the West until after the Peace of Westphalia). The MacMillan Encyclopedia of Religions states:

The very attempt to define religion, to find some distinctive or possibly unique essence or set of qualities that distinguish the religious from the remainder of human life, is primarily a Western concern. The attempt is a natural consequence of the Western speculative, intellectualistic, and scientific disposition. It is also the product of the dominant Western religious mode, what is called the Judeo-Christian climate or, more accurately, the theistic inheritance from Judaism, Christianity, and Islam. The theistic form of belief in this tradition, even when downgraded culturally, is formative of the dichotomous Western view of religion. That is, the basic structure of theism is essentially a distinction between a transcendent deity and all else, between the creator and his creation, between God and man.

The anthropologist Clifford Geertz defined religion as a

[…] system of symbols which acts to establish powerful, pervasive, and long-lasting moods and motivations in men by formulating conceptions of a general order of existence and clothing these conceptions with such an aura of factuality that the moods and motivations seem uniquely realistic."

Alluding perhaps to Tylor's "deeper motive", Geertz remarked that

[…] we have very little idea of how, in empirical terms, this particular miracle is accomplished. We just know that it is done, annually, weekly, daily, for some people almost hourly; and we have an enormous ethnographic literature to demonstrate it.

The theologian Antoine Vergote took the term supernatural simply to mean whatever transcends the powers of nature or human agency. He also emphasized the cultural reality of religion, which he defined as

[…] the entirety of the linguistic expressions, emotions and, actions and signs that refer to a supernatural being or supernatural beings.

Peter Mandaville and Paul James intended to get away from the modernist dualisms or dichotomous understandings of immanence/transcendence, spirituality/materialism, and sacredness/secularity. They define religion as

[…] a relatively-bounded system of beliefs, symbols and practices that addresses the nature of existence, and in which communion with others and Otherness is lived as if it both takes in and spiritually transcends socially-grounded ontologies of time, space, embodiment and knowing.

According to the MacMillan Encyclopedia of Religions, there is an experiential aspect to religion which can be found in almost every culture:

[…] almost every known culture [has] a depth dimension in cultural experiences […] toward some sort of ultimacy and transcendence that will provide norms and power for the rest of life. When more or less distinct patterns of behavior are built around this depth dimension in a culture, this structure constitutes religion in its historically recognizable form. Religion is the organization of life around the depth dimensions of experience—varied in form, completeness, and clarity in accordance with the environing culture.

=== Classical ===
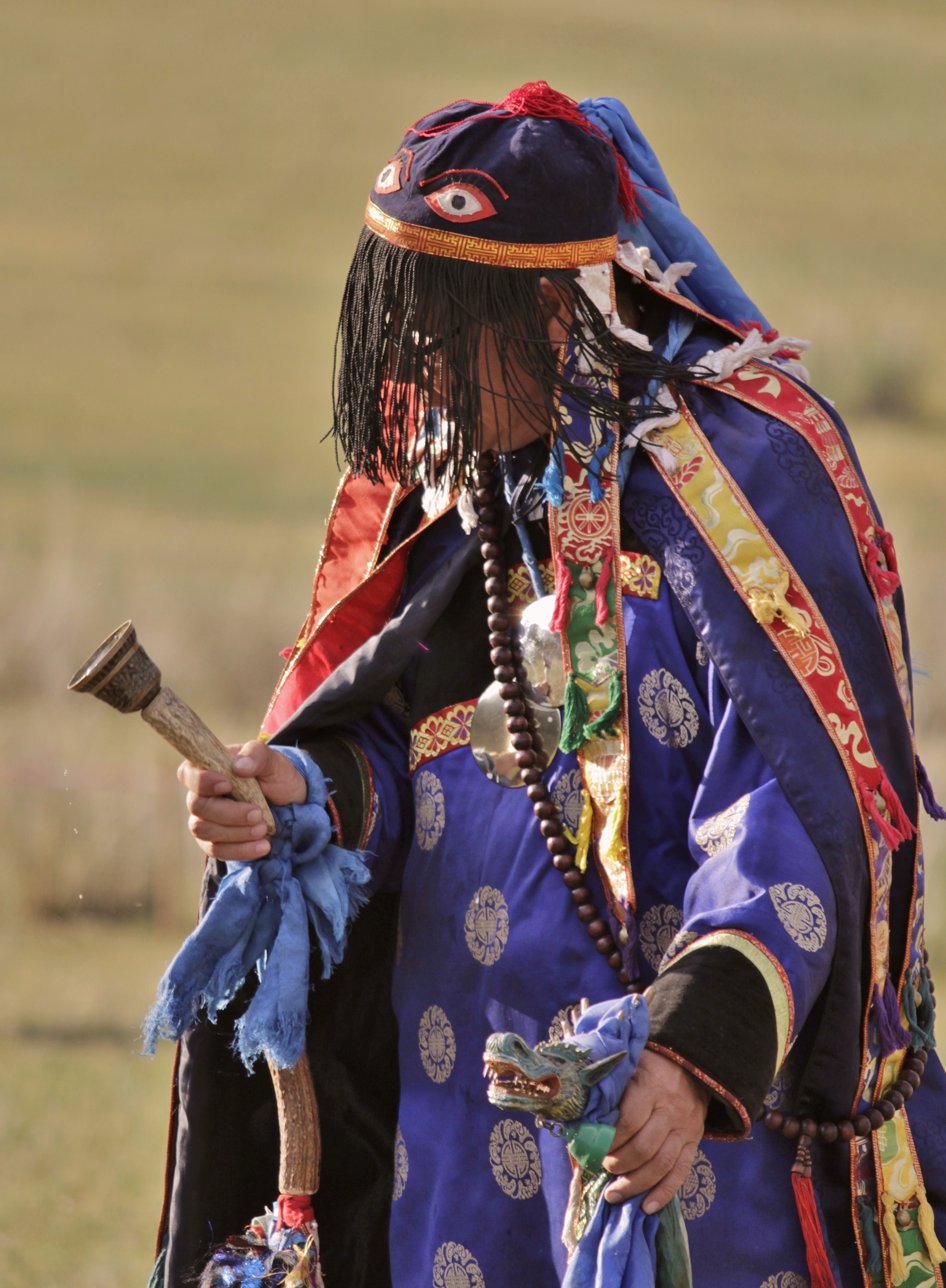
Budazhap Shiretorov (Будажап Цыреторов), the head shaman of the religious community Altan Serge (Алтан Сэргэ) in Buryatia.

Friedrich Schleiermacher in the late 18th century defined religion as das schlechthinnige Abhängigkeitsgefühl, commonly translated as "the feeling of absolute dependence".

His contemporary Georg Wilhelm Friedrich Hegel disagreed thoroughly, defining religion as "the Divine Spirit becoming conscious of Himself through the finite spirit."

Edward Burnett Tylor defined religion in 1871 as "the belief in spiritual beings". He argued that narrowing the definition to mean the belief in a supreme deity or judgment after death or idolatry and so on, would exclude many peoples from the category of religious, and thus "has the fault of identifying religion rather with particular developments than with the deeper motive which underlies them". He also argued that the belief in spiritual beings exists in all known societies.

In his book The Varieties of Religious Experience, the psychologist William James defined religion as "the feelings, acts, and experiences of individual men in their solitude, so far as they apprehend themselves to stand in relation to whatever they may consider the divine". By the term divine James meant "any object that is godlike, whether it be a concrete deity or not" to which the individual feels impelled to respond with solemnity and gravity.

The sociologist Émile Durkheim, in his seminal book The Elementary Forms of the Religious Life, defined religion as a "unified system of beliefs and practices relative to sacred things". By sacred things he meant things "set apart and forbidden—beliefs and practices which unite into one single moral community called a Church, all those who adhere to them". Sacred things are not, however, limited to gods or spirits. (Note: That is how, according to Durkheim, Buddhism is a religion. "In default of gods, Buddhism admits the existence of sacred things, namely, the four noble truths and the practices derived from them"Durkheim 1915) On the contrary, a sacred thing can be "a rock, a tree, a spring, a pebble, a piece of wood, a house, in a word, anything can be sacred". Religious beliefs, myths, dogmas and legends are the representations that express the nature of these sacred things, and the virtues and powers which are attributed to them.

Echoes of James' and Durkheim's definitions are to be found in the writings of, for example, Frederick Ferré who defined religion as "one's way of valuing most comprehensively and intensively". Similarly, for the theologian Paul Tillich, faith is "the state of being ultimately concerned", which "is itself religion. Religion is the substance, the ground, and the depth of man's spiritual life."

When religion is seen in terms of sacred, divine, intensive valuing, or ultimate concern, then it is possible to understand why scientific findings and philosophical criticisms (e.g., those made by Richard Dawkins) do not necessarily disturb its adherents.

== Religion as a modern Western construct ==
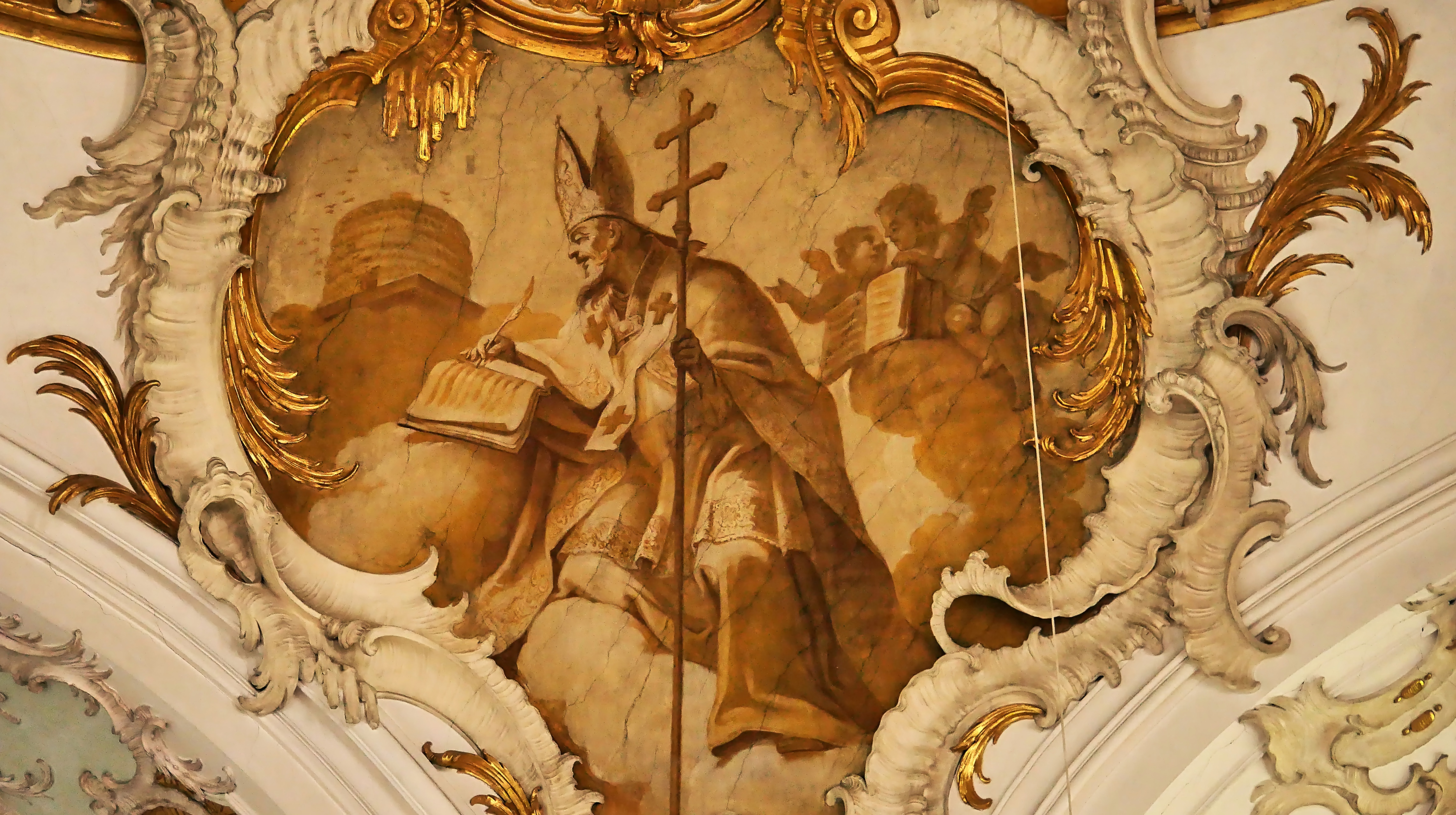
Fresco of St. Augustine of Hippo, Maria Steinbach. Saint Augustine was a Christian theologian and the bishop of Hippo Regius in north Africa and is viewed as one of the most important Church Fathers in Western Christianity for his writings. Among his most important works are The City of God, On Christian Doctrine and Confessions.

A number of scholars have pointed out that the terminology used in the study of religion in the West derives from Judeo-Christian tradition, and that the basic assumptions of religion as an analytical category are all Western in origin. This idea was first raised by Wilfred Cantwell Smith in his 1962 book, The Meaning and End of Religion. Among the main proponents of this theory of religion are Daniel Dubuisson, Timothy Fitzgerald, Talal Asad, and Jason Ānanda Josephson Storm. These social constructionists argue that religion is a modern concept that developed from Christianity and was then applied inappropriately to non-Western cultures.

While few would dispute that the concept of religion does have a historical genealogy, there is some disagreement about what the Western origin of the term has meant historically. Some such as Tomoko Masuzawa have felt that the equation of religion with Christianity diminished other traditions, especially in the study of comparative religions as it developed during the high point of Western imperialism. Others have felt that this sort of criticism overestimates the influence that Western academic thought had on the rest of the world.

Daniel Dubuisson, a French anthropologist, argues that the idea of religion has changed a lot over time and that one cannot fully understand its development by relying on consistent use of the term, which "tends to minimize or cancel out the role of history". "What the West and the history of religions in its wake have objectified under the name 'religion' is ... something quite unique, which could be appropriate only to itself and its own history." He notes that St. Augustine's definition of religio differed from the way we use the modern word religion.

Dubuisson prefers the term "cosmographic formation" to religion. Dubuisson says that, with the emergence of religion as a category separate from culture and society, there arose religious studies. The initial purpose of religious studies was to demonstrate the superiority of the living or universal European world view to the dead or ethnic religions scattered throughout the rest of the world, expanding the teleological project of Schleiermacher and Tiele to a worldwide ideal religiousness. Due to shifting theological currents, this was eventually supplanted by a liberal-ecumenical interest in searching for Western-style universal truths in every cultural tradition.

According to Timothy Fitzgerald, religion is not a universal feature of all cultures, but rather a particular idea that first developed in Europe under the influence of Christianity. Fitzgerald argues that from about the 4th century CE Western Europe and the rest of the world diverged. As Christianity became commonplace, the charismatic authority identified by Augustine, a quality we might today call religiousness, exerted a commanding influence at the local level. As the Catholic Church lost its dominance during the Protestant Reformation and Christianity became closely tied to political structures, religion was recast as the basis of national sovereignty, and religious identity gradually became a less universal sense of spirituality and more divisive, locally defined, and tied to nationality. It was at this point that religion was dissociated from universal beliefs and moved closer to dogma in both meaning and practice. However, there was not yet the idea of dogma as a personal choice, only of established churches. With the Enlightenment religion lost its attachment to nationality, says Fitzgerald, but rather than becoming a universal social attitude, it now became a personal feeling or emotion.

Talal Asad later refined this notion by showing that many assumptions about religion derive specifically from post-Enlightenment Christianity. Asad argues that before the word religion came into common usage, Christianity was a disciplina, a rule just like that of the Roman Empire. This idea can be found in the writings of St. Augustine (354–430). Christianity was then a power structure opposing and superseding human institutions, a literal Kingdom of Heaven. It was the discipline taught by one's family, school, church, and city authorities, rather than something calling one to self-discipline through symbols.

These ideas are developed by S. N. Balagangadhara. In the Age of Enlightenment, Balagangadhara argues that the idea of Christianity as the purest expression of spirituality was supplanted by the concept of religion as a worldwide practice. This caused such ideas as religious freedom, a reexamination of classical philosophy as an alternative to Christian thought, and more radically Deism among intellectuals such as Voltaire. Much like Christianity, the idea of religious freedom was exported around the world as a civilizing technique, even to regions such as India that had never treated spirituality as a matter of political identity.

In The Invention of Religion in Japan, Josephson Storm argued that while the concept of religion was Christian in its early formulation, non-Europeans (such as the Japanese) did not just acquiesce and passively accept the term's meaning. Instead they worked to interpret religion (and its boundaries) strategically to meet their own agendas and staged these new meanings for a global audience. In nineteenth century Japan, Buddhism was radically transformed from a pre-modern philosophy of natural law into a religion, as Japanese leaders worked to address domestic and international political concerns. The European encounter with other cultures therefore led to a partial de-Christianization of the category religion. Hence religion has come to refer to a confused collection of traditions with no possible coherent definition.

In more recent work, Storm has sought both to generalize and to move beyond the critique of the category of religion using what he terms a metamodern perspective. Storm argues that the problems with the category of religion reflect broader ways different concepts in the human sciences may be deconstructed; in particular, Storm analogizes the debate about the definition of religion to classificatory disputes about art. In turn, developing a theory of social kinds influenced by philosophy of biology, Storm argues that both the concept of religion and individual religions should be analyzed as "property clusters" that temporarily gain stability according to an "anchoring process." For this reason, Storm proposes studying both the concept of religion and individual religions by identifying causal processes that worked in multiple directions, rejecting both essentialism and oversimplified critiques of the definition of religion as a Western imposition.

George Lindbeck, a Lutheran and a postliberal theologian (but not a social constructionist), says that religion does not refer to belief in God or a transcendent Absolute, but rather to "a kind of cultural and/or linguistic framework or medium that shapes the entirety of life and thought ... it is similar to an idiom that makes possible the description of realities, the formulation of beliefs, and the experiencing of inner attitudes, feelings, and sentiments."

== See also ==
- Belief
- Outline of religion
- Philosophy of religion
- Sociology of religion
- Secular shrine theory
- State Shinto

== Bibliography ==
- Asad, Talal (1993). Genealogies of Religion. Baltimore: Johns Hopkins Univ. Press.
- Asad, Talal (2003). Formations of the Secular: Christianity, Islam, Modernity. Stanford, CA: Stanford.
- Balagangadhara, S. N. (1994). The Heathen in His Blindness... New York: Brill Academic Publishers.
- Bergunder, Michael (2014). "What is Religion? The Unexplained Subject Matter of Religious Studies". Method & Theory in the Study of Religion. 26 (3): 246–286. doi:10.1163/15700682-12341320.
- Droogers, André "Defining Religion: A Social Science Approach", The Oxford Handbook of the Sociology of Religion, ed. Peter B. Clarke. Oxford: Oxford University Press, 2009, pp. 263–279.
- Dubuisson, Daniel (2003). The Western Construction of Religion: Myths, Knowledge, and Ideology. Johns Hopkins University Press. ISBN 978-0-8018-7320-1.
- Dubuisson, Daniel (2007). "Exporting the Local: Recent Perspectives on 'Religion' as a Cultural Category". Religion Compass. 1 (6): 787–800. doi:10.1111/j.1749-8171.2007.00049.x.
- Dawes, Gregory; Maclaurin, James, eds. (2013). A New Science of Religion. Routledge.
- Doe, Norman (2011). Law and Religion in Europe: A Comparative Introduction.
- Durkheim, Emile (1915). The Elementary Forms of the Religious Life. London: George Allen & Unwin.
- Feil, Ernst (2000). On the Concept of Religion. Global Academic Publishing.
- Fitzgerald, Timothy (2007). Discourse on Civility and Barbarity. Oxford University Press.
- Geertz, Clifford (1993). "Religion as a cultural system". The interpretation of cultures: selected essays, Geertz, Clifford (PDF). London: Fontana Press. pp. 87–125. (originally published in 1966)
- Greil, Arthur L. & Bromley, David G., eds. Defining Religion: Investigating the Boundaries between the Sacred and Secular. Amsterdam: JAI, 2003.
- James, William (1902). The Varieties of Religious Experience. A Study in Human Nature. Longmans, Green, and Co.
- Hamilton, Malcolm. The Sociology of Religion: Theoretical and Comparative Perspectives, 2nd edn. London–NY: Routledge, 2001 (1st edn. 1995), pp. 12–21.
- Idinopulos, Thomas A. & Wilson, Brian C., eds. What Is Religion?: Origins, Definitions, and Explanations. Leiden–Boston: Brill, 1998.
  - Wilson, Brian C. "From the Lexical to the Polythetic: A Brief History of the Definition of Religion", pp. 141–162.
- Josephson, Jason Ānanda (2012). The Invention of Religion in Japan. Chicago, IL: University of Chicago Press.
- Kunin, Seth Daniel. Religion: The Modern Theories. Edinburgh University Press, 2003.
- Lindbeck, George A. (1984). Nature of Doctrine. Louisville, KY: Westminster/John Knox Press.
- Martin, Craig (2009). "Delimiting Religion". Method and Theory in the Study of Religion. 21 (2): 157–176. doi:10.1163/157006809x431015.
- Masuzawa, Tomoko (2005). The Invention of world religions: Or, How European universalism was preserved in the language of pluralism. Chicago, IL: University of Chicago Press. ISBN 978-0-226-50989-1.
- Minahan, James (2002). Encyclopedia of the Stateless Nations. Westport, Conn.: Greenwood Press.
- Moojan Momen. The Phenomenon of Religion: A Thematic Approach. Oxford: Oneworld, 1999.
- Nelson, Robert (2010). New Holy Wars. Penn State University Press.
- Oman, Doug (2013). "Defining Religion and Spirituality". In Paloutzian, Raymond; Park, Crystal L. (eds.). Handbook of the psychology of religion and spirituality (2nd ed.). New York: Guilford. pp. 23–47. ISBN 978-1-4625-1006-1.
- Pennington, Brian Kemble (2005). Was Hinduism Invented?. New York: Oxford University Press. ISBN 978-0-19-516655-2.
- Platvoet, Jan G. & Molendijk, Arie L., eds. The Pragmatics of Defining Religion: Contexts, Concepts and Contests. Leiden–Boston: Brill, 1999.
- Saler, Benson (1993). Conceptualizing religion: Immanent anthropologists, transcendent natives, and unbounded categories (1st ed.). E.J. Brill. ISBN 978-90-04-09585-4. OCLC 760377656.
- Schaffalitzky de Muckadell, Caroline (2014). "On Essentialism and Real Definitions of Religion". Journal of the American Academy of Religion. 82 (2): 495–520. doi:10.1093/jaarel/lfu015.
- Smith, Wilfred Cantwell (1991) [1962]. The Meaning and End of Religion. Fortress Press.
- Michael Stausberg & Steven Engler. "Definition", The Oxford Handbook of the Study of Religion, eds. Michael Stausberg & Steven Engler. Oxford: Oxford University Press, 2016, pp. 9–32.
- Storm, Jason Josephson (2021). Metamodernism: The Future of Theory. Chicago: University of Chicago Press. ISBN 978-0-226-78665-0.
- Taves, Ann (2009). Religious Experience Reconsidered: A Building-Block Approach to the Study of Religion and other Special Things. Princeton University Press.
