= Donald A. Yerxa =

American historian (born 1950)

- Born: July 19, 1950 (age 76)
- Education: Eastern Nazarene College, University of Maine
- Employer: Boston University
- Known for: Editor, Historian
- Title: Director, Senior Editor
- Website: http://www.enc.edu/history/faculty.html

Donald A. Yerxa (born July 19, 1950) is an American author, editor, and historian.

== Biography ==
Yerxa received his bachelor's degree in history from the Eastern Nazarene College in 1972 and a master's degree (1974) and Ph.D. (1982) from the University of Maine on a university fellowship. He was a director of The Historical Society (THS) at Boston University and a senior editor of Historically Speaking, published by the Johns Hopkins University Press.

Yerxa is the former chair of the History Department at his alma mater, the Eastern Nazarene College, where he taught from 1977 to 2014, and launched the history department's distinguished lecture series in the 1990s. He was editor of the Conference on Faith and History's journal Fides et Historia from 2011 to 2020. He was a guest co-editor for the European Review's, forum on the Scientific Revolution, and was a contributing editor for Books and Culture magazine. He was a frequent contributor to the Research News & Opportunities in Science and Theology publication for the John Templeton Foundation (JTF) and has been a multiple grant recipient.

== Published works ==
Yerxa has written scores of articles, review essays, book reviews, and encyclopedia entries for a number of publications. He has also conducted over one hundred published interviews of prominent historians and scholars from other disciplines. He is the author of three books, two on naval history: Admirals and Empire, and The Burning of Falmouth, and Species of Origins: America’s Search for a Creation Story with coauthor Karl Giberson. Admirals was described as "solidly researched, clearly and economically written, and intelligently conceived... a useful synthesis filling a gap in the existing literature," Species of Origins was widely reviewed as a uniquely even-handed and concise contribution to the scholarship on the creation–evolution controversy in the United States. Galileo scholar William Shea lauded the account as the "best-written and most perceptive of the current accounts available," while author Edward Larson described it as the "next best thing for those of us not enrolled in their courses." Professor of science Michael Ruse described it as “a simply invaluable primer on the subject that should be made compulsory reading for all who have ever thought on science-and-religion ... I can think of no better place to start into the debate about origins — creationism or evolution — than with this book.” It has been the subject of and catalyst for various discussions, conferences, and other books.

Yerxa has also edited seven volumes in the Historians in Conversation series for the University of South Carolina Press. And he has also two edited other volumes: British Abolitionism, Moral Progress, and Big Questions in History (University of South Carolina Press, 2012) and Religion and Innovation: Antagonists or Partners (Bloomsbury, 2016).
