= Randall J. Stephens =

American historian

- Born: 1973 (age 52–53)

Academic background
- Education: Mid-America Nazarene College (BA); Emporia State University (MA); Nazarene Theological Seminary; University of Florida (PhD)

Academic work
- Discipline: Historian
- Sub-discipline: American religious history
- Institutions: Eastern Nazarene College; Northumbria University; University of Oslo

Randall J. Stephens (born 1973) is an editor and historian of American religion.

== Career ==
Stephens is a Professor of American and British Studies at the University of Oslo. From 2004 to 2012 he was an Assistant and Associate Professor of History at Eastern Nazarene College in Quincy, and from 2012 to 2018 he was a Reader and Associate Professor of History and American Studies at Northumbria University, in Newcastle, England. He served as editor of the Journal of Southern Religion from 2006 to 2010, and from 2005 to 2013 he was an editor of Historically Speaking published by Johns Hopkins University Press, based out of Boston University. From 2011 to 2016 he was also an associate editor of Fides et Historia. Stephens has been named a Top Young Historian by the History News Network (HNN). He has written for The New York Times, The Washington Post, The Christian Century, the Independent, Salon, the Conversation, the Immanent Frame, Religion Dispatches, and The Atlantic. In 2011–2012, he was a Fulbright Roving Scholar in Norway. In 2013, he was named a Distinguished Lecturer by the Organization of American Historians.

== Education ==
He received his Ph.D. in American History, under the direction of Bertram Wyatt-Brown, from the University of Florida. Stephens' dissertation explored the roots of holiness and Pentecostalism in the American South. It won the St. George Tucker Society's prize for best dissertation in Southern Studies and the University of Florida History Department’s Richard Milbauer dissertation award. Stephens also holds a Master's in Theological Studies from Nazarene Theological Seminary, a Master's in History from Emporia State University, and a bachelor's degree from Mid-America Nazarene College.

== Published works ==
Stephens is the author of The Fire Spreads: Holiness and Pentecostalism in the American South (Harvard University Press). This book won Stephens the Smith-Wynkoop Book Award from the Wesleyan Theological Society and received praise from TLS, Publishers Weekly and the Atlantic. In 2011 the Belknap Press of Harvard University Press published his book, co-authored with science-and-religion scholar Karl Giberson, titled The Anointed: Evangelical Truth in a Secular Age. His third book, The Devil's Music: How Christians Inspired, Condemned, and Embraced Rock 'n' Roll, was published by Harvard University Press in 2018. He is the editor of Recent Trends in Religious History, part of the "Historians in Conversation Series: Understanding the Past," with the University of South Carolina Press. He has authored chapters for volumes published by the University of Kentucky Press, Oxford University Press, Columbia University Press (the Bibliographic editor for The Columbia Guide to Religion in American History), the University of South Carolina Press, Cambridge University Press, the University of Florida Press, and the University of Alabama Press.
