= International Society for Science and Religion =

International scholarly organization for religion and science

The International Society for Science and Religion (ISSR) is an international learned society and research organisation that promotes scholarly study of the relationships between the natural sciences and the world's religious traditions. Founded in 2002 after a four-day conference in Granada, Spain, the Society elects Fellows through peer nomination and brings together natural scientists, historians, philosophers, theologians and educators to support interdisciplinary learning and research in an international and multi-faith context.

ISSR's inaugural President was the theoretical physicist and Anglican priest John Polkinghorne, who was succeeded by the cosmologist George Ellis; both received the Templeton Prize, an early indication of the calibre of the Society's leadership. The Society is governed by an executive committee chaired by a President elected from among the Fellowship, and its day-to-day administration is led by an Executive Secretary and assistant director. Members hold the post-nominal letters FISSR (Fellow of the International Society for Science and Religion); the inaugural cohort of 97 founding Fellows included five Fellows of the Royal Society.

The Society's principal activities are research projects funded by major foundations, an annual or biennial international conference, publication programmes (including the ISSR Library and an annual international Book Prize), public statements on issues at the science-religion interface, and the curation of the Boyle Lectures on Science and Religion, which it has co-organised with the London church of St Mary-le-Bow since the series' modern revival in 2004. Although headquartered in the United Kingdom, registered in England as a charity, ISSR's Fellowship is global, drawing scholars from Europe, the Americas, Africa, the Middle East and Asia.

ISSR has issued public statements on contentious questions at the science-religion boundary, most notably a 2008 statement on intelligent design, which the Society concluded was "neither sound science nor good theology."

== History ==
=== Foundation and the Granada conference ===
The Society was established in 2002 from the express intention of John Templeton in the wake of the 9/11 attacks. His John Templeton Foundation created the legal and operational framework which bore the Society. ISSR took shape after a four-day inaugural conference held in Granada, Spain - a city which, as the Society notes on its own publications, "until the late 15th century was the centre of peaceful discourse between scholars of Judaism, Christianity and Islam." The choice of Granada reflected an explicit aspiration that the new Society engage the sciences in dialogue with multiple religious traditions rather than with Christianity alone.

=== Founding fellowship ===
The first cohort of Fellows numbered at 97 and included five Fellows of the Royal Society. The early Fellowship was multi-faith from the outset, and the founding contributors to the Society's first edited volume, Why the Science and Religion Dialogue Matters (Watts and Dutton, eds, 2006), included contributors John Polkinghorne, George Ellis, Holmes Rolston III and Fraser Watts writing from Christian perspectives; Carl Feit on Judaism; Munawar Anees on Islam; B. V. Subbarayappa on Hinduism; Trinh Xuan Thuan on Buddhism; and Heup Young Kim on Asian Christianity.

=== Subsequent development ===
After the Granada conference, the Society held a sequence of major international meetings. A 2004 conference in Boston, "Creation: Probability and Law," culminated in a public lecture by three Templeton Prize-winning Fellows. A 2006 Cambridge conference, "Understanding Humans in a Scientific Age," gave rise to the edited volume Human Identity at the Intersection of Science, Technology and Religion (Murphy and Knight, Ashgate, 2010). In 2009 the Society convened "Evolution, Religion and Suffering" at the University of Cambridge; in 2010 it marked the eightieth birthday of its founding President with a "God and Physics" conference at St Anne's College and the Clarendon Laboratory, at the University of Oxford. Subsequent meetings were held in Sharjah (2011, jointly with the British Council and the American University of Sharjah), Loccum (2012), Baltimore (2013), Vienna (2015, with Sigmund Freud University), Puebla (2017, with Latin-American partners), Oxford (2017, with the Ian Ramsey Centre), Lyon and Pretoria (2018), and through joint programming with the American Academy of Religion in the United States, which continues today and shared on the ISSR YouTube channel.

The COVID-19 pandemic prompted the Society to develop digital formats for its public lectures and conferences. From the 2021 Boyle Lecture onward, under the management of the assistant director, Anthony K Nairn, recordings have been released through the ISSR YouTube channel and followed by live online discussion panels with the Lecturer, Respondent, and an expert panel.

== Mission and aims ==
The Society describes itself as "dedicated to advancing education through interdisciplinary learning and research in the fields of science and religion, broadly understood." In a statement on the Society's homepage, the current President, theologian Niels Henrik Gregersen, characterises ISSR's purpose as "to be a scholarly society that promotes rigorous research on and balanced understandings of two central cultural forces of yesterday and today," noting that Fellows examine the science-religion relationship "from the perspective of many different disciplines, from physics and biology to psychology and the social sciences onwards to theology and philosophy." The Society's stated aim is "to include in our membership the leading figures around the world concerned with science and religion, and to advance the exploration of their interface for the benefit of all."

== Governance ==
=== Structure ===
ISSR is led by a President, elected from among the Fellowship, and an executive committee. The Society's day-to-day operations are administered by an Executive Secretary, Fraser Watts, and the assistant director, Anthony K Nairn.

=== Current officers (as of 2026) ===
The Society's officers, drawn from its public Officers page, are listed below.

==== Leadership ====
1. President - Niels Henrik Gregersen
2. Vice-president - Edward Larson
3. Programs Officer - Nancy Howell

==== Executive ====
1. Ron Cole-Turner
2. Jeffrey Schloss
3. Shoaib Malik
4. Berry Billingsley
5. Noah Efron
6. Ignacio Silva
7. Kate Rigby
8. Bethany Sollereder
9. Josh Reeves

=== Past presidents ===
1. John Polkinghorne (founding President)
2. George Ellis
3. Sir Brian Heap
4. John Hedley Brooke (2008—2011)
5. Michael J. Reiss
6. Niels Henrik Gregersen (current)

=== Policies ===
The Society published a Code of Conduct and is, as of early 2026, developing further policies on research integrity and misconduct, data protection, risk management, whistleblowing, anti-fraud and bribery, and travel and subsistence. The executive committee undertakes to review these policies every two years.

== Fellowship ==
=== Election and post-nominal letters ===
Election to Fellow of the International Society for Science and Religion is by nomination only. Successful nominees become entitled to use the post-nominal letters FISSR upon completion of the ISSR nomination. The society also recognises a senior category of honorary fellows, who use the post-nominal HonFISSR.

=== Nomination criteria ===
The Society's published criteria recognise four pathways to nomination: significant contributions to science-and-religion scholarship; excellence in one of the constituent disciplines combined with sustained engagement in science-religion dialogue; organisational and entrepreneurial work in the field; and outstanding promise demonstrated by early-career scholars.

=== Size, disciplinary and geographic distribution ===
ISSR has nearly 450 Fellows across the globe. Members are drawn from natural sciences (e.g. physics, astronomy, biology, neuroscience), psychology and the social sciences, history and philosophy of science, philosophy, theology and religious studies, and education research. The Society notes geographic representation including South Korea, India, Hong Kong, Japan, the United Arab Emirates, Israel, Brazil, Argentina, Europe, the United States, the United Kingdom, and more. Although many founders worked from a Christian background, the Fellowship has from the outset included all faith traditions and non-belief frameworks, including Buddhist, Hindu, Jewish, Muslim and atheist scholars.

=== Honorary fellows ===
ISSR currently has twelve honorary fellows, several of which are Templeton Prize laureates and senior figures from international science and theology areas of research.

Examples include:

- Francisco Ayala
- John Hedley Brooke
- Francis S. Collins
- Marcelo Gleiser
- Martin Rees
- Michael Reiss
- Holmes Rolston III

=== Deceased fellows ===
The Society maintains a record of deceased Fellows. Among them are the physicist Ian Barbour, widely regarded as a founder of the modern science-and-religion field; the historian of astronomy Owen Gingerich (Harvard University); the sociologist Peter Berger (Boston University); the cosmologist John D. Barrow (Cambridge); the climate scientist Sir John Houghton, founding co-chair of the Intergovernmental Panel on Climate Change Working Group I; the physicist of nuclear and complex matter Tom McLeish (Durham and York); the philosopher of physics Bernard d'Espagnat; the geneticist R. J. ("Sam") Berry (UCL); the statistician David Bartholomew (LSE); the historian of science David Lindberg; the Catholic theologian Denis Edwards; and the Pamplona-based natural philosopher Mariano Artigas, among others.

=== Notable currently active fellows (selection) ===
- Denis Alexander
- John Hedley Brooke
- Nancy Cartwright
- Philip Clayton
- Andrew Davison
- Celia E. Deane-Drummond
- Ilia Delio
- Marius Dorobantu
- Robin Dunbar
- John H. Evans
- Robert Geraci
- Ursula Goodenough
- John F. Haught
- Terence Keel
- Robert Lawrence Kuhn
- Joanna Leidenhag
- Shoaib Malik
- Alister McGrath
- Nancey Murphy
- Arthur Petersen
- Robert Pollack
- Robert John Russell
- Jennifer Wiseman

== Activities and programmes ==
=== The Boyle Lectures ===
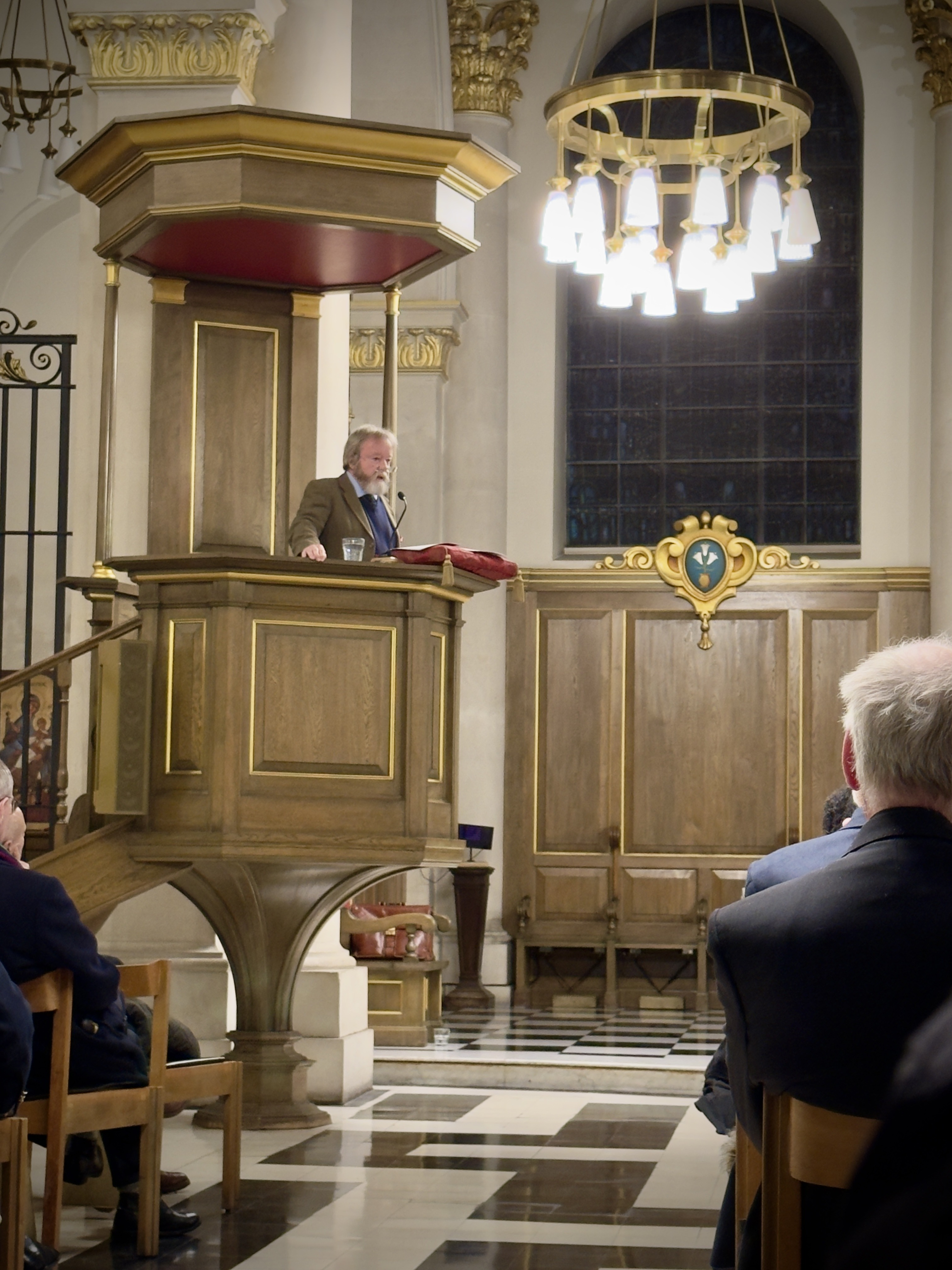
Iain McGilchrist delivering the 2026 Boyle Lecture at St Mary-le-Bow Church

Since 2004 ISSR has been integrally involved in the modern Boyle Lectures on Science and Religion, held annually at the Christopher Wren church of St Mary-le-Bow on Cheapside in the City of London. The original Boyle Lectures were a series of sermons delivered at several London and Westminster churches following their endowment in 1692 by the natural philosopher Robert Boyle; that original series ran until around 1730, after which only sporadic Boyle Lectures were given.

The modern Lectures are administered by the Board of the Boyle Lectures together with the Rector and Churchwardens of St Mary-le-Bow, with ISSR taking the central role in management and operation. The format consists of a Lecture delivered by a prominent figure in the sciences or in religion, followed by a Response from a figure of equal standing. Since the 2021 Lecture by Tom McLeish, delivered during the COVID-19 pandemic, ISSR has hosted the "Digital Boyle Lecture" on YouTube, followed by a live online discussion panel led by the ISSR President.

The lecturers since the revival have been as follows.

Year	Lecturer	Title
2004	John F. Haught	Darwin, Design and the Promise of Nature
2005	Simon Conway Morris	Darwin's Compass: How Evolution Discovers the Song of Creation
2006	Philip Clayton	The Emergence of Spirit: From Complexity to Anthropology to Theology
2007	John D. Barrow	Cosmology of Ultimate Concern
2008	Malcolm Jeeves	Psychologising and Neurologising about Religion: Facts, Fallacies and the Future
2009	Keith Ward	Misusing Darwin: The Materialist Conspiracy in Evolutionary Biology
2010	John Hedley Brooke	The Legacy of Robert Boyle - Then and Now
2011	Jurgen Moltmann	Is the World Unfinished? On Interactions between Science and Theology in the Concepts of Nature, Time and the Future
2012	Celia Deane-Drummond	Christ and Evolution: A Drama of Wisdom?
2013	John Polkinghorne	Science and Religion in Dialogue
2014	Alister McGrath	New Atheism - New Apologetics: The Use of Science in Recent Christian Apologetic Writings
2015	Russell Re Manning	Natural Theology Revisited (Again)
2016	Sarah Coakley	Natural Theology in a Changed Key? Evolution, Cooperation, and the God Question
2017	Robert J. Russell	Theological Influences in Scientific Research Programmes: Natural Theology In Reverse
2018	Mark Harris	Apocalypses Now: Modern Science and Biblical Miracles
2019	Michael Reiss	Science, Religion and Ethics
2020	Christopher Cook	Mental Health and the Gospel
2021	Tom McLeish	The Rediscovery of Contemplation Through Science
2022	Christopher Southgate (response by Andrew Davison)	God and a World of Natural Evil: Theology and Science in Hard Conversation
2023	Rowan Williams	Attending to Attention
2024	David Fergusson	Is it 'natural' to believe in God?
2025	Antje Jackelen, Archbishop Emerita of Uppsala (response by Arthur Petersen)	Science, Technology, Theology and Spirituality - A Necessary Partnership?
2026	Dr Iain McGilchrist	God, the Brain, and the nature of Truth

=== Annual conference and symposia ===
The Society has convened a series of international conferences since its founding, typically held biennially in summer, with regional meetings in the United States timed to the American Academy of Religion's annual meeting. Recent themes have included "Artificial and Spiritual Intelligence" (Cambridge, 2023) and "Ecology between Religions and Sciences: Minds and Bodies in Nature" (Swindon, 2025), the latter prompted by the Society's adoption of ecology and the environment as a new priority research area. Earlier joint conferences have been mounted with the European Society for the Study of Science and Theology (in Lyon, 2018, and Madrid, 2021) and with the Ian Ramsey Centre at the University of Oxford (2017).

=== Conference outputs ===
A characteristic output of an ISSR conference is an edited book or journal special issue. Conference-derived publications include:

Title	Editor(s)	Publisher / journal	Year
Why the Science and Religion Dialogue Matters	F. Watts & K. Dutton	Templeton Press	2006
Creation, Law and Probability	F. Watts (ed.)	Ashgate	2008
Human Identity at the Intersection of Science, Technology and Religion	N. Murphy & C. Knight	Ashgate	2008
Responses to Darwin in the Religious Traditions	J. H. Brooke (ed.)	Zygon 46(2)	2011
Science and Religion around the World	J. H. Brooke & R. L. Numbers	Oxford University Press	2011
God and the Scientist: Exploring the Work of John Polkinghorne	F. Watts & C. Knight	Ashgate	2012
Embodied Cognition and Religion	F. Watts (ed.)	Zygon 48(3)	2013
Evolution, Religion and Cognitive Science	F. Watts & L. Turner	Oxford University Press	2014
Science and Religion: Issues and Trends	S. Khalili & F. Watts	Open Theology 1	2015

=== The ISSR Library ===
A flagship publication initiative is the ISSR Library, a curated foundational collection of 250 books drawn "from all important areas and disciplines as well as key international and intercultural voices" in the field of science and religion. The titles are selected by drawing on the collective expertise of the Society's Fellowship and listed at issrlibrary.org.

=== ISSR Annual Book Prize ===
Since 2020 the Society has awarded an annual international Book Prize for "exceptional texts written in the field of science and religion." Three awards of GBP 500 are made each year for the best academic, the best general-audience, and the best professional / educator book. The prize can be split between co-authors where applicable. Eligible titles must have been published within the preceding two years, books in any language are accepted, and self-nomination is permitted. The winner of the Prizes are as follows:

==== 2025 ====
Academic category: Emily Qureshi-Hurst, Salvation in the Block Universe: Time, Tillich, and Transformation (Cambridge University Press, 2024)

General readership: Francis Collins, The Road to Wisdom: On Truth, Science, Faith and Trust (Little Brown & Worthy Books, 2024)

Professionals and educators: Beth Singler, Religion and Artificial Intelligence: An Introduction (Routledge, 2024)

==== 2024 ====
Academic category: Peter N. Jordan, Naturalism in the Christian Imagination: Providence and Causality in Early Modern England (Cambridge University Press, 2022)

General readership: Philip Goff, Why? The Purpose of the Universe (Oxford University Press, 2023)

Professionals and educators: Nicholas Spencer, Magisteria: The Entangled Histories of Science & Religion (Oneworld, 2023)

==== 2023 ====
Academic category: Jonathan Topham, Reading the Book of Nature: How Eight Bestsellers Reconnected Christianity and the Sciences on the Eve of the Victorian Age (University of Chicago Press, 2022)

General readership: Andrew Briggs and Michael Reiss, Human Flourishing: Scientific Insight and Spiritual Wisdom in Uncertain Times (Oxford University Press, 2021)

Professionals and educators: Donovan O. Schaefer, Wild Experiment: Feeling Science and Secularism after Darwin (Duke University Press, 2022)

==== 2022 ====
Academic category: Shoaib Ahmed Malik, Islam and Evolution: Al-Ghazali and the Modern Evolutionary Paradigm (Routledge, 2022)

General readership: John Lardas Modern, Neuromatic: or, A Particular History of Religion and the Brain (University of Chicago Press, 2021)

Professionals and educators: Calvin Mercer and Tracy Trothen, Religion and the Technological Future: An Introduction to Biohacking, Artificial Intelligence and Transhumanism (Palgrave Macmillan, 2022)

==== 2021 ====
Tom Aetchner, Media and Science-Religion Conflict (Routledge, 2020)

Ariel Glucklich, The Joy of Religion: Exploring the Nature of Pleasure in the Spiritual Life (Cambridge University Press, 2020)

James W. Jones, Living Religion: Embodiment, Theology and the Possibility of a Spiritual Sense (Oxford University Press, 2019)

==== 2020 ====
Agustin Fuentes, Why We Believe: Evolution and the Human Way of Being (Yale University Press, 2019)

Silke Gülker, Transzendenz in der Wissenschaft. Studien in der Stammzellforschung in Deutschland und in den USA (Ergon, 2019)

Christopher White, Other Worlds: Spirituality and the Search for Invisible Dimensions (Harvard University Press, 2018)

=== YouTube and "ISSR In Conversation" ===
The Society maintains a YouTube channel through which it publishes the Digital Boyle Lecture series, conference keynote recordings, project events, and discussion programming.

=== Statements and position papers ===
ISSR publishes occasional statements on contested questions at the science-religion interface. The most widely cited is the Society's February 2008 ISSR Statement on the Concept of "Intelligent Design", which concluded that intelligent design "is neither sound science nor good theology" and which received broad coverage in religious-affairs media. More recent statements have addressed the Society's annual Book Prize, conferences and calls for papers.

== Projects and grants ==
The Society has hosted or led a sequence of major research projects, predominantly funded by Templeton-family foundations.

=== Repose, Insight, Activity: A Trinity of Spiritual Exercises (SORSE) ===
The Society's flagship current project is "Repose, Insight, Activity: A Trinity of Spiritual Exercises," delivered through ISSR's wider programme on The Science of Religious and Spiritual Exercises (SORSE). It is funded by the Templeton World Charity Foundation (grant TWCF 2023–32537). The Principal Investigator is Fraser Watts, with collaborating partners include Harris Wiseman, Coventry Cathedral, the Guild of Health, and the Centre for Science and Faith in Copenhagen. The project examines three categories of spiritual practice - physical activity (yoga, tai chi, qigong), sensory absorption (plainsong chanting), and conceptual cognition (the "Wonder" exercise) - drawing on Philip Barnard's Interacting Cognitive Subsystems framework.

=== Understanding spiritual intelligence ===
This project, funded by the Templeton World Charity Foundation's Diverse Intelligences initiative and led from October 2020 by Yorick Wilks and William Clocksin on the artificial intelligence side and Rowan Williams and Fraser Watts on the religion / theology side, investigated how "human intelligence is deployed in distinctive ways in spiritual and religious life." It generated five research strands ranging from computational modelling of contemplative attention through religious-language analytics to an "artificial spiritual companion" software prototype (Affinity, 2022). A Cambridge Companion on religion and AI, edited by Fraser Watts and Beth Singler, and YouTube outputs.

=== Religion & the social brain ===
Beginning in April 2017 with funding from the Templeton Religion Trust (grant TRT 0153), this project drew on Robin Dunbar's Social Brain Hypothesis to test the proposition that religion arose chiefly from embodied ritual practice - including trance dance and endorphin release - rather than from cognition alone. Research strands included a newly built Hunter-Gatherer Religion Database covering 85 historical societies, field studies of endorphin markers and social bonding in Christian, Afro-Brazilian and secular services, and double-blind endorphin-blocker trials using Naltrexone. The project found that social bonding decreased significantly under endorphin blockade. Outputs include a conference with keynote lectures by Robin Dunbar, James W. Jones and Celia Deane-Drummond, all posted to YouTube.

=== The new biology ===
Funded by the Templeton World Charity Foundation (grant TWCF 0129), this project, co-led by Michael Reiss as Principal Investigator and Michael Ruse as Co-Investigator, with Fraser Watts as project co-ordinator, addressed the philosophical, theological and educational implications of contemporary holistic and systemic biology. Workshops were held in October 2015 and September 2016. Outputs included seven peer-reviewed articles in Zygon (2017), an educational survey instrument, twelve lesson plans (six in religious education and six in biology), and a forthcoming book by Reiss and Ruse to be published by Harvard University Press. A partnership with the UCL Institute of Education supported the educational sub-grant.

=== Human nature & embodied cognition ===
This earlier John Templeton Foundation-funded project ran from April 2011 with Fraser Watts as Principal Investigator and Leon Turner as Senior Research Associate, joined by Daniel Weiss (Cambridge), Mark Williams (Oxford Mindfulness Centre), James W. Jones and John Teske. The project examined embodied-cognition perspectives on religious thought across Buddhist, Jewish and Christian traditions, arguing that embodied cognition offers theological pathways between dualism and physicalist reductionism. Outputs included a 2012 Loccum conference, a special issue of Zygon (September 2013), and the monographs I Am Who I Am (Turner) and Embodied Spirituality (Watts).

=== ISSR Latin American libraries ===
Funded by the John Templeton Foundation, this initiative distributes 30 book collections in Spanish and Portuguese to Latin American higher-education institutions - including seminaries of any denomination - to provide scholars with access to the latest science-and-religion literature in their own languages. Application rounds closed on 15 February and 15 August 2022.

=== The library project ===
The ISSR Library Project produced a foundational 250-title collection in the field of science and religion, curated by the Fellowship; the catalogue is hosted at issrlibrary.org.

== Partnerships and affiliations ==
ISSR's institutional partners and affiliated organisations span funders, churches, learned societies and universities. Principal among them are:

- John Templeton Foundation, Templeton World Charity Foundation and Templeton Religion Trust - the Society's principal grant-makers since its inception, having funded the Society's establishment in 2002 and the bulk of its subsequent project portfolio.
- St Mary-le-Bow Church, City of London - joint host of the Boyle Lectures on Science and Religion since 2004, with ISSR taking the leading role on the Board of the Boyle Lectures.
- University of Cambridge - the Society's earlier central office was based at St Edmund's College, Cambridge.
- European Society for the Study of Science and Theology (ESSSAT) - joint conferences in Lyon (2018) and Madrid (delayed from 2020 to 2021).
- Ian Ramsey Centre for Science and Religion (University of Oxford) - joint conference at St Anne's College, Oxford (2017).
- American Academy of Religion (AAR) - multi-year sessions at AAR annual meetings.
- British Council and American University of Sharjah - joint "Belief in Dialogue" conference (Sharjah, 2011).
- Sigmund Freud University, Vienna - joint conference, 2015.
- University of South Africa and the Southern African Science and Religion Forum (SASRF) - joint conference, Pretoria, 2018.
- UPAEP (Universidad Popular Autonoma del Estado de Puebla) and Fundacion DECYR (La Plata) - IX Latin-American Conference on Science and Religion, Puebla, 2017.
- UCL Institute of Education - partner on The New Biology project's educational research strand.
- Coventry Cathedral, the Guild of Health, and the Centre for Science and Faith, Copenhagen - partners on the current SORSE project.
- Centro de Estudios en Ciencia y Religion (UPAEP) - partner on Latin-American library distribution work.

== Reception and influence ==
The Society's public profile rests on three pillars: the international standing of its elected Fellowship; the longevity and prestige of the Boyle Lectures, of which it is the principal modern steward; and its participation in major media-covered debates at the science-religion interface. The 2008 Statement on Intelligent Design attracted broad coverage in faith- and policy-oriented media, including the British religious-affairs publication Ekklesia, which reported the Society's conclusion that intelligent design is "neither sound science nor good theology" under the headline "Leading science and theology scholars reject 'intelligent design'." The 2025 award of the Society's Book Prize in the general-readership category to Francis S. Collins for The Road to Wisdom drew attention to the Society's prize within the broader public conversation about science and religion.

The Society's edited volumes - published by Oxford University Press, Ashgate, the Templeton Press and Cambridge Scholars Press, and its special issues of Zygon: Journal of Religion and Science and Open Theology represent the field's most visible recent collective scholarship.

== See also ==
- Science and religion
- Ian Ramsey Centre for Science and Religion
- Faraday Institute for Science and Religion
- European Society for the Study of Science and Theology
- Zygon: Journal of Religion and Science
- Templeton Prize
- Boyle Lectures
- Issues in Science and Religion by Ian Barbour
