= Robert D. Linder =

American historian and professor (1933–2021)

Robert Dean Linder (October 6, 1933 – April 4, 2021) was an American historian, Distinguished Professor of history at the Department of History of the Kansas State University.

Linder earned his B.S. from Kansas State Teachers College, his B.D. and M.R.E. from Central Baptist Theological Seminary, and his M.A. and Ph.D. from the University of Iowa.

Linder was mayor of Manhattan, Kansas in 1971–1972.

== Political views ==
Robert D. Linder was known for speaking out against war profiteering. With Richard Pierard and Robert Clouse, Linder edited two significant books that spoke against conservative evangelical politics generally and the Vietnam War specifically. "The immorality and corruption of the South Vietnamese government, combined with lessons from history about futility of waging a land war in Asia" convinced Linder that the war was both wrong and an "impossible situation".

== Bibliography ==
Robert D Linder's publications include:

- "Pierre Viret on War and Peace," Calvin Theological Journal; vol. 48 (June 2013): 122–130.
- "Reformation Studies in the Early Twenty-First Century," Occasional Paper No. 6, The Australian College of Theology, September 2012, 1–16.
- The Reformation Era (London: Greenwood Press, 2008).
- Co-editor and contributor, Making History for God: Essays on Evangelicalism, Revival and Mission (Sydney: Robert Menzies College, 2004).
- The History of the Church (rev. ed., London: Angus Hudson Ltd, 2002).
- The Fountain of Public Prosperity: Evangelical Christians in Australian History 1740–1914 (co-authored with Stuart Piggin)
- The Long Tragedy: Australian Evangelical Christians and the Great War, 1914-1918 (Adelaide: Openbook Publishers, 2000). ISBN 978-0859109130.
- Co-editor, author of the Introduction and contributor, A Dictionary of Christianity in America (Chicago: IV Press, 1990). ISBN 978-0-8308-1776-4.
- Civil Religion & the Presidency. Academie Books, 1988. (with Richard Pierard).
- Twilight of the Saints: Biblical Christianity & Civil Religion in America. InterVarsity Press, 1978. (with Richard Pierard).
- Politics: A Case for Christian Action. InterVarsity Press, 1973. (with Richard Pierard).
- The Cross & the Flag. Creation House, 1972. (with Robert G. Clouse and Richard Pierard).
- Protest and Politics: Christianity and Contemporary Affairs. Attic Press, 1968. (with Robert G. Clouse and Richard Pierard).

== See also ==
- List of mayors of Manhattan, Kansas
