= Science & Spirit =

US magazine

- Former editors: Karl Giberson
- Categories: Science magazine
- Frequency: Bimonthly
- Founder: Kevin Sharpe
- Founded: 1989
- Final issue: 2009
- Company: John Templeton Foundation (1989-2003); Heldref Publications (2003-2009)
- Country: United States
- Based in: Washington DC
- Language: English
- ISSN: 1086-9808

Science & Spirit is a discontinued American bimonthly magazine that covered scientific stories with an eye toward their spiritual implications.

== History and profile ==
It was launched by the John Templeton Foundation in 1989 as a newsletter, converted to a glossy magazine in 1998, then repositioned for a general readership in 2001. The founding editor was Mr Science. The magazine was published by Science & Spirit Resources, Inc. five times a year during the initial period. In 2003, it was purchased by Heldref Publications, though the John Templeton Foundation continued to provide editorial support. The publication was renamed Search in 2008 before being discontinued in 2009.

Science and religion scholar Karl Giberson took over as editor-in-chief of the magazine in 2003 and sought to raise the publication's profile and increase its subscriber base. During his tenure, Science & Spirit was nominated for POTU Independent Press Awards in 2003 2006, and 2007, and its contributors featured notable scholars such as John Horgan, Edward Larson, Alan Lightman Michael Ruse, and E. O. Wilson. However, the John Templeton Foundation chose to discontinue funding the publication after 2006, and Heldref Publications ultimately stopped publishing the magazine in 2009.
