= Richard Pierard =

American historian (1934–2025)

Richard V. Pierard
- Born: May 29, 1934; Chicago, Illinois, U.S.
- Died: February 24, 2025 (aged 90); Asheville, North Carolina, U.S.
- Education: California State University–Los Angeles (B.A., M.A. History); University of Iowa (Ph.D. Modern European History, 1964)
- Occupation: Historian · Professor · Evangelical critic
- Years active: 1964–2006
- Organizations: Indiana State University; Gordon College; Conference on Faith and History; Evangelical Theological Society; Baptist World Alliance Heritage Commission
- Known for: Critiques of evangelicalism and civil religion; contributions to Baptist and American religious historiography
- Notable work: Protest and Politics: Christianity and Contemporary Affairs (with Linder & Clouse, 1968); Twilight of the Saints: Biblical Christianity and Civil Religion in America (1978); Civil Religion & the Presidency (with Linder, 1988); Two Kingdoms: The Church and Culture Through the Ages (1993)
- Spouse: Charlene Burdett (m. 1957)
- Children: Two

Richard Victor Pierard (May 29, 1934 – February 24, 2025) was an American historian and professor at Indiana State University whose work addressed evangelicalism, civil religion, Baptist history, and Christianity in public life.

== Early life and education ==
Richard Victor Pierard was born on May 29, 1934 in Chicago, Illinois, and raised in Richland, Washington. His parents were Jack P. and Diana F. Pierard. After serving in the United States Army from 1954–1956, he completed his undergraduate degree in history at California State University–Los Angeles (CSULA) in 1958 and obtained an MA in history at CSULA a year later. He earned a PhD in modern European history from the University of Iowa in 1964. At Iowa, he met fellow evangelical graduate students Robert D. Linder and Robert G. Clouse. The three collaborated on several books during the 1960s and 1970s.

== Academic career ==
In 1964, Pierard began teaching modern European history at Indiana State University. He remained at Indiana State until his retirement in 2000. Afterward, he became a scholar in residence and the Stephen Phillips Professor of History at Gordon College in Wenham, Massachusetts, until his second retirement in 2006.

Pierard was a founding member of the Conference on Faith and History and served as its secretary-treasurer from 1967 to 2004. Pierard was also a member of the International Association for Mission Studies, the American Historical Association, and the Evangelical Theological Society, serving as president of the latter in 1985.

Pierard also was a visiting professor at various institutions, including Regent College, Fuller Theological Seminary, the University of Otago in New Zealand, and the South Asia Institute of Advanced Christian Studies. Additionally, he was a research fellow at the University of Aberdeen and a Fulbright professor at the University of Frankfurt and the University of Halle.

He also served as a Democratic Party precinct committeeman, a board member of Evangelicals for Social Action, and an advisory committee member for Americans United for Separation of Church and State.

In addition, Pierard received a Fulbright scholarship at the University of Hamburg (1962-63) and the Terre Award for Outstanding Community Service in Religion (1991).

== Influence ==
In 1968, Pierard, Clouse, and Linder published Protest and Politics: Christianity and Contemporary Affairs, which examined evangelical responses to contemporary political and social issues.

Pierard was also one of the signers of the 1973 Chicago Declaration of Evangelical Social Concern, which called on evangelicals to engage with social and economic justice issues. In the same year, he coauthored Politics: A Case for Christian Action with Linder, a handbook aimed at Christian university students.

Pierard wrote extensively about evangelicalism and civil religion in the United States. His coauthored works with Linder include Twilight of the Saints: Biblical Christianity and Civil Religion in the United States (1978) and Civil Religion and the Presidency (1988), which provided historical case studies on the topic. He also wrote on the history of Christianity, particularly its influence on society and role in American culture.

Two Kingdoms: The Church and Culture Through the Ages, coauthored with Robert G. Clouse and Edwin M. Yamauchi, surveyed the relationship between Christianity and Western culture across two millennia, including discussions of war, economic change, gender roles, and secularization. Doug Bandow in Christianity Today called the book a "valuable guide" to Christian heritage, and Frederick Norris in the International Bulletin of Missionary Research noted its importance for its conservative Protestant perspective.

In The American Church Experience: A Concise History, written with Thomas A. Askew, Pierard examined the history of evangelicalism in the United States, including its development and its involvement in social and political issues. Ronald Flowers praised the book for its clarity, balance, and thorough treatment of American Christianity, and David Torbett highlighted its accessibility for clergy, scholars, and general readers. Henry Warner Bowden questioned its broad definition of evangelicalism but also described it as "competent, workmanlike, fair, and well balanced."

== Later work and Baptist involvement ==
From the 1980s onward, Pierard increasingly published on global Christianity and Baptist history. An American Baptist layperson, he served on the Baptist World Alliance Baptist Heritage and Identity Commission, which sought to document Baptist history worldwide.

Pierard was a vocal critic of many Baptists whose actions he saw as inconsistent with Baptist historical principles, frequently criticizing the Southern Baptist Convention. According to Liam Atchison, Pierard's scholarship and commentary on evangelicalism and Baptist identity made him a significant influence in evangelical academia.

== Personal life ==
Pierard was married in 1957 to Charlene Burdett, a librarian, and had two children. He lived for many years in Hendersonville, North Carolina after his retirement from teaching.

== Death ==
Pierard died on February 24, 2025 in Asheville, North Carolina.

== Select bibliography ==
- Protest and Politics: Christianity and Contemporary Affairs. Attic Press, 1968. (with Robert G. Clouse and Robert D. Linder).
- The Unequal Yoke: Evangelical Christianity and Political Conservatism. Lippincott, 1970.
- The Cross & the Flag. Creation House, 1972. (with Robert G. Clouse and Robert D. Linder).
- Politics: A Case for Christian Action. InterVarsity Press, 1973. (with Robert D. Linder).
- Twilight of the Saints: Biblical Christianity & Civil Religion in America. InterVarsity Press, 1978. (with Robert D. Linder).
- Civil Religion & the Presidency. Academie Books, 1988. (with Robert D. Linder).
- Two Kingdoms: The Church and Culture through the Ages. Moody Press, 1993. (with Robert G. Clouse and Edwin M. Yamauchi).
- The Revolution of the Candles: Christians in the Revolution of the German Democratic Republic. Mercer University Press, 1996. (with Jörg Swoboda).
- The New Millennium Manual: A Once and Future Guide. Baker Books, 1999. (with Robert G. Clouse).
- Baptists Together in Christ 1905-2005: A Hundred-Year History of the Baptist World Alliance. Samford University Press, 2005.
- The American Church Experience: A Concise History. Wipf and Stock Publishers, 2008. (with Thomas A. Askew).
- Global Evangelicalism: Theology, History and Culture in Regional Perspective. InterVarsity Press, 2014. (with Donald M. Lewis).
