= Karl W. Giberson =

Canadian physicist and scholar (born 1957)

Karl Giberson
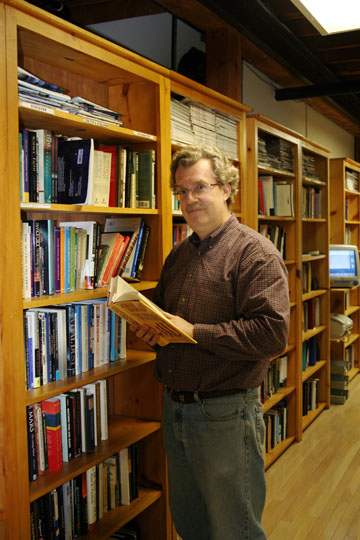
- Giberson in 2006
- Born: May 13, 1957 (age 69); Bath, New Brunswick, Canada
- Education: Eastern Nazarene College, Rice University
- Scientific career
- Fields: Physics, Theology
- Workplaces: Eastern Nazarene College, Stonehill College
- Doctoral advisor: Barry Dunning
- Website: http://www.karlgiberson.com

Karl Willard Giberson (born May 13, 1957) is a Canadian physicist, scholar, and author, specializing in the creation–evolution debate. He has held a teaching post since 1984, written several books, and been a member of various academic and scientific organizations. He formerly served as vice president of the BioLogos Foundation.

== Education ==
Giberson holds two bachelor's degrees (in philosophy and in physics/math) from Eastern Nazarene College, and both a master's degree and a PhD in physics from Rice University.

== Career ==
Giberson was a member of the faculty at his alma mater, Eastern Nazarene College, from 1984 to 2011. In that time, he taught courses on physics, astronomy, and science and religion, as well as directing the Honors Scholar Program. His strong support for evolution made him increasingly controversial and played a role in his departure in 2011.

Giberson is also a fellow of the American Scientific Affiliation (ASA). He co-directed the Venice Summer School on Science and Religion, and has lectured on science and religion at Oxford University, the Ettore Majorana Foundation and Centre for Scientific Culture in Sicily, and various colleges and universities in the United States. In 2006, he was invited to speak at the Vatican on "America's Ongoing Hostility to Darwinism" and at the Harvard Club of New York City in 2008.

In early 2009, Giberson became the Executive Vice President of The BioLogos Foundation, founded by Francis Collins. He served briefly as president before leaving the foundation in 2011 to further pursue his passion for writing.

In 2012, Giberson became a faculty member at Stonehill College in Easton, Massachusetts, where he is a scholar-in-residence in science and religion.

In 2013, Giberson was elected to the International Society for Science and Religion (ISSR).

== Published works ==
Giberson is a contributing editor to Books & Culture, where he has published many essays on science. He was the founding editor of Science & Theology News, the leading publication in the field until it ceased publication in 2006, and editor-in-chief of Science & Spirit from 2003 to 2006 for the John Templeton Foundation.

Giberson has published over two hundred articles, reviews, and essays, both technical and popular. In addition to blogging regularly at the Huffington Post, Giberson has written for The New York Times, Salon.com, Discover, Perspectives on Science & Faith, CNN.com, Quarterly Review of Biology, Weekly Standard, Christian History, Christianity Today, Zygon, USA Today and other publications. He has appeared on many radio shows including NPR's Talk of the Nation.

His essay "Say it Ain't So: America's Ongoing Hostility to Religion" appears in the college reader What Matters in America.

=== Books ===
- Worlds Apart: The Unholy War between Religion and Science, (Church of the Nazarene and Beacon Hill Press, 1993) has, despite controversy, been used at various Nazarene and other evangelical colleges to counter Christian Fundamentalist approaches to "origins".
- Species of Origins: America’s Search for a Creation Story (Rowman & Littlefield Publishers, 2002), coauthored with Don Yerxa, garnered recognition as one of the most balanced treatments of the creation–evolution controversy in print. America's leading scholar of creationism, Ronald Numbers, described it as "accessible, accurate, and even-handed." It is used as a textbook and has been translated into Polish for an inclusion in a contemporary philosophy series.
- The Oracles of Science: Celebrity Scientists Versus God and Religion (Oxford University Press, 2006), co-authored with Spanish philosopher Mariano Artigas, examines the purported "abuse of science" in the service of secularism by six scientists of this generation: Carl Sagan, Stephen Jay Gould, E.O. Wilson, Richard Dawkins, Steven Weinberg, and Stephen Hawking. The book has been translated into Italian, Spanish and Polish.
- Saving Darwin: How to be a Christian and Believe in Evolution (HarperOne, 2008), was recognized by the Washington Post Book World as "One of the best books of 2008."
- The Language of Science and Faith: Straight Answers to Genuine Questions (InterVarsity Press, 2011), coauthored with Francis Collins, aims to show Christians why they need not reject science nor God.
- Quantum Leap: How John Polkinghorne Found God in Science and Religion (Lion UK, 2011), coauthored with Dean Nelson, examines the science-and-religion relationship through the lens of the life of physicist and Anglican priest John Polkinghorne.
- The Anointed: Evangelical Truth in a Secular Age (Harvard University Press, 2011) coauthored with Randall J. Stephens, explores how intellectual authority is applied and misapplied in Evangelicalism. The authors wrote an op-ed for The New York Times summarizing some of the issues that the book raises.
- The Wonder of the Universe: Hints of God in Our Fine-Tuned World (IVP Books, 2012), is an exploration of the religious resonances of our modern understanding of cosmology.
- Seven Glorious Days: A Scientist Retells the Genesis Creation Story (Paraclete Press, 2012), explores what the Biblical creation story would look like if it were written within the framework of modern science.
- Saving the Original Sinner: How Christians Have Used the Bible's First Man to Oppress, Inspire, and Make Sense of the World (Beacon Press, 2015), explains how the idea of the Biblical Adam has evolved throughout the ages and explores the influence that the fall of Adam has had on Western ideas. Giberson contends that the attempts of Evangelical Christians to preserve a literal interpretation of the Biblical creation story have contributed to them becoming intellectually isolated in a variety of fields.
