= The Space of Religion =

2023 non-fiction book

The Space of Religion: Temple, State, and Buddhist Communities in Modern China
- Author: Yoshiko Ashiwa and David L. Wank
- Publisher: Columbia University Press
- Publication date: 2023
- ISBN: 978-0-231-19735-9
- OCLC: 1355223989

The Space of Religion: Temple, State, and Buddhist Communities in Modern China is a non-fiction book written by Yoshiko Ashiwa and David L. Wank. It was published in 2023 by Columbia University Press as part of their Sheng Yen Series in Chinese Buddhism. The book has received considerable scholarly acclaim. In 2024, it was a Finalist for the Award for Excellence in the Study of Religion in Analytical-Descriptive Studies conferred by the American Academy of Religion; and was awarded Honorable Mention, Francis L.K. Hsu Book Prize by the Society for East Asian Anthropology.

== General references ==
- Bianchi, Ester (2024-04-02). "The space of religion. Temple, state, and Buddhist communities in modern China: by Yoshiko Ashiwa and David L. Wank, New York: Columbia University Press, 2023, ISBN: 9780231197342, 440 pages (ppK)". Politics, Religion & Ideology. 25 (2): 313–316. doi:10.1080/21567689.2024.2349412. ISSN 2156-7689.
- Chadwin, Joseph (June 2024). "THE SPACE OF RELIGION: TEMPLE, STATE, AND BUDDHIST COMMUNITIES IN MODERN CHINA. By YoshikoAshiwa and David L.Wank. New York: Columbia University Press, 2023. Pp. xxii + 416. Hardback, $140.00; Paperback, $35.00". Religious Studies Review. 50 (2): 402–402. doi:10.1111/rsr.17126. ISSN 0319-485X.
- Chang, Kuei-min (May 2024). "The Space of Religion: Temple, State, and Buddhist Communities in Modern China Yoshiko Ashiwa and David L. Wank. New York: Columbia University Press, 2023. 440 pp. $35.00; £30.00 (pbk). ISBN 9780231197359". The China Quarterly. 258: 587–588. doi:10.1017/S0305741024000377. ISSN 0305-7410.
- Lin, Xiangyi (October 2024). "The Space of Religion: Temple, State, and Buddhist Communities in Modern China: by Yoshiko Ashiwa and David L. Wank, New York, Columbia University Press, 2023, xvi+416 pp., US$35.00 (paperback) ISBN 978023 119735 9". Religion. 54 (4): 754–757. doi:10.1080/0048721X.2024.2355065. ISSN 0048-721X.
- Nichols, Brian (2024-07-01). ": The Space of Religion: Temple, State, and Buddhist Communities in Modern China". The China Journal. 92: 160–162. doi:10.1086/730605. ISSN 1324-9347.
- Osburg, John (2025-04-07). "The Space of Religion: Temple, State, and Buddhist Communities in Modern China. By Yoshiko Ashiwa and David L. Wank". Journal of Church and State. 67 (2). doi:10.1093/jcs/csaf012. ISSN 2040-4867.
