= Science, Reason and Faith Group =

Group of university teachers in Spain

- Grupo Ciencia, Razón y Fe
- Formation: 2002; 24 years ago
- Founder: Mariano Artigas, Juan Luis Lorda, Antonio Pardo, Carlos Pérez, Francisco Gallardo and Santiago Collado
- Founded at: (Spain) Pamplona, Navarra
- Fields: Religious studies
- Official language: English
- Director: Javier Sánchez Cañizares
- Website: CRYF

The group Science, Reason and Faith (CRYF, standing for Ciencia, Razón y Fe in Spanish) is formed by teachers at the University of Navarra. Its purpose is to promote the interdisciplinary study of issues related to science, philosophy and religion. The activities of the group cover three closely related areas: research, teaching and public engagement.

== History of the group ==
The beginning of the CRYF group dates back to the informal conversations that, at the end of the 20th century, professors Mariano Artigas († 2006) and Carlos Pérez († 2005) maintained about interdisciplinary questions and public debates concerning the relationship between science and faith.

In 2002, circumstances were favorable for the creation of the group. Its founding members were professors Mariano Artigas, Juan Luis Lorda, Antonio Pardo, Carlos Perez, Francisco Gallardo and Santiago Collado. Since its inception, in addition to other teachers from the University of Navarra, the group has incorporated prestigious intellectuals and experts on the topics of interest as collaborating members: Evandro Agazzi, William Shea, Juan Arana and Tito Arecchi are some of the present collaborators.

Professor Artigas was appointed the first director of the group, a position he held until his death. The contribution of his intellectual output, which the group has inherited as his legacy, could be summarized as having contributed to unify and highlight the relationship between science and religion. In this endeavor, it is important not to reduce thought to mere scientific rationality, where science is understood as empirical or experimental science. The name of the group expresses this conviction: science, reason and faith. The CRYF is currently considered one of the centers that has contributed most to exploring the common ground shared by science, philosophy and theology in southern Europe.

The CRYF has received funding from the Templeton Foundation twice. In 2006, for the project entitled "The Human Singularity: The Origin, Nature, and Destiny of the Human Being" and in 2011, in order to set up the "Mariano Artigas Memorial Lectures". The Mariano Artigas Lectures are held every two years in October and have a two-fold purpose: to honor the figure of Professor Artigas and to recognize the work done by the invited lecturer in the field of the relations between science and religion. Previous speakers have been William Shea in 2011, Karl Giberson in 2013 and Giuseppe Tanzella-Nitti in 2015. In 2017, the Lecture was entrusted to Spanish philosopher Juan Arana.

At the beginning of 2007, after the death of Mariano Artigas, the professor of Physics, Héctor Mancini replaced him as head of the group until the beginning of 2010. During the period 2010-2016 the director was the neuroscientist, philosopher and priest José Manuel Giménez Amaya. Since the beginning of 2016, this position is held by the physicist, theologian and priest Javier Sánchez Cañizares.

== Interests and objectives ==
Broadly speaking, the CRYF group is interested in discussing the big issues from the perspective of the dialogue between science, reason and faith. Specifically, the main topics of interest are the following:

- Origin of man, origin of life and origin of the universe
- Nature and causes of evolution
- Mind-brain relationship
- Relations between science and truth
- Relations between science and religion
- Order, complexity and purpose
- Classic science-faith debates (Galileo case) and current ones (creationism and evolutionism)

More specific goals of the group are: to promote among its members research and publications on the topics of interest; to develop lessons and teaching materials for intra- and extra-mural education; to make available, through the Internet, an archive of documents on the areas of interest that could be useful as teaching material and for outreach activities; and to promote the organization of activities, collaborations and scientific meetings that can help achieve the goals of the group.

== Activities and some outcomes ==
The CRYF group organizes monthly open seminars with invited speakers, followed by a discussion in which academics from various areas of expertise (such as theology, physics, medicine, philosophy and biology) exchange ideas and opinions. These seminars may also have the format of a round table or a workshop, and they are uploaded to the YouTube channel of the University of Navarra. One activity that deserves special mention was the workshop organized by the CRYF in collaboration with the "Thomas More Institute" of London in 2009, to study the contributions of Mariano Artigas. The presentations of that meeting were later collected and published in the book "Science and Faith Within Reason".

In collaboration with the Nicolaus Copernicus University of Torun (Poland), the CRYF group publishes the interdisciplinary scientific journal "Scientia et Fides" twice a year. This peer-reviewed open-access magazine publishes original articles addressing in a rigorous way the relationships between science and religion from different perspectives. The second issue of 2016 was a special number commemorating the tenth anniversary of the death of Mariano Artigas.

With regard to teaching, the CRYF group teaches three courses on issues related to science and religion at the University of Navarra. It also collaborates regularly with the Higher Institute of Religious Sciences of the same university. The members of the CRYF are available to give seminars or conferences on the topics of interest to any institution requesting it. Several schools, cultural foundations and universities across Spain, Europe and Latin America have already benefited from this collaboration.

== Bibliography ==
- Giménez-Amaya, José Manuel, "Mariano Artigas (1938–2006). Testimony of some meetings and brief reflections on the Research Group ‘Science, Reason and Faith’ (CRYF) of the University of Navarra", Scientia et fides, vol. IV, n. 2 (2016), pp. 41–55.
- Navarro, Jaume, Science and Faith within Reason: Reality, Creation, Life and Design, Routledge, Londres, 2011, 248 pp.
- Oviedo, Lluis; Garre, Álvaro, "The Interaction between Religion and Science in Catholic Southern Europe (Italy, Spain and Portugal)", Zygon, vol. 50, no. 1 (2015), pp. 172–193.
- Shea, William R., The Galileo Affair. What theology could learn from scientists, Pamplona, October 18, 2011,
- Udías Vallina, Agustín, Ciencia y religión: dos visiones del mundo, Sal Terrae, Santander, 2010, 424 pp.
