= The Myth of Disenchantment =

2017 book by Jason Josephson Storm

The Myth of Disenchantment: Magic, Modernity, and the Birth of the Human Sciences
- First edition
- Author: Jason Josephson Storm
- Language: English
- Subject: religious studies; intellectual history; magic
- Publisher: University of Chicago Press
- Publication date: 2017
- Publication place: United States
- Media type: Print
- Pages: 400
- ISBN: 9780226403229

The Myth of Disenchantment: Magic, Modernity, and the Birth of the Human Sciences is a 2017 book by Jason Josephson Storm, professor of religion at Williams College. The book challenges mainstream sociological conceptions of disenchantment on both empirical and theoretical grounds. In making this argument, The Myth of Disenchantment uses intellectual historical methods to reinterpret several theorists of disenchantment, including James George Frazer, Max Weber, and the Frankfurt School.

The Myth of Disenchantment received largely positive reviews in academic journals, and scholars in a variety of subfields of religious studies have drawn on its arguments. The book also attracted interest in semi-popular and amateur venues, with Storm discussing some of its central arguments in web articles and podcasts.

== Background ==
In graduate school, Storm received training in continental philosophy and critical theory, traditions that are cited and discussed in The Myth of Disenchantment. Storm's earlier work, including his 2012 book The Invention of Religion in Japan, extensively discussed questions of theory in religious studies and European intellectual history, especially in the early modern period.

According to the book's preface, Storm decided to write the book partly to challenge Eurocentric accounts of disenchantment that saw Europe as fundamentally different from other cultures because it was uniquely disenchanted.

Storm published academic articles anticipating some of the main arguments of The Myth of Disenchantment in J19 and History of Religions.

== Synopsis ==
The first chapter of the book presents empirical and statistical data arguing that a widespread loss of belief in magic has not occurred in the Western world. Storm notes that disenchantment is not correlated with secularization and belief in some form of magic or the paranormal persists across most religious, educational, and age divisions. Storm argues that these data challenge theoretical attempts to rigidly distinguish the course of European history from the history of other regions.

The subsequent chapters challenge commonplace narratives about disenchantment in intellectual history. Storm argues that formative thinkers of the Scientific Revolution including Isaac Newton, Francis Bacon, and Giordano Bruno did not see their projects as disenchanted.

In the book's third chapter, Storm examines the roots of the myth of disenchantment in German Romanticism. Storm argues that figures such as Friedrich Schiller described disenchantment in mythic terms and traces the origin of concerns about disenchantment to the Pantheism controversy. Moreover, figures such as Friedrich Hölderlin actually anticipated a form of re-enchantment.

Storm goes on to examine the connections between Spiritualism, the Theosophical Society, and early 20th-century scholarship on religion. He notes the parallels between Max Müller's research and Éliphas Lévi's magical treatment of the history of religions, as well as Müller's interest in Hermeticism. He also shows the connections between linguistics, scholarship on religion, and the ideas of Helena Blavatsky.

The book explores the relationship between other modern philosophers and contemporary belief in magic, including Kant's Dreams of a Spirit-Seer and Sigmund Freud's interest in telepathy. Storm discusses James George Frazer's similarities to Neoplatonism and the influence of Frazer's project upon Aleister Crowley, suggesting Frazer's account of magic was not fully disenchanted. In the chapter on Frazer, Storm also notes that narratives of the decline of magic have parallels in folklore that describes the departure of fairies.

The final body chapter of the book offers a new interpretation of Max Weber and his theories of rationalization and disenchantment. Storm notes Weber's interest in mysticism and familiarity with modern esoteric movements through his presence at the Monte Verità community. In light of Weber's familiarity with modern occultism, Storm suggests that his conception of disenchantment in fact refers to magic's sequesterization, rationalization, and professionalization, not its disappearance.

In addition to exposing disenchantment as a "myth" in the sense of a false narrative, The Myth of Disenchantment argues that disenchantment has come to function as a "regulative ideal," which leads people to disavow belief in magic and act as though Western society is disenchanted even though disenchantment has not come to pass.

== Popularization ==
While written primarily for an academic audience, The Myth of Disenchantment has also been discussed in semi-popular, popular, and amateur venues. Storm published web articles summarizing arguments from the book in aeon.co, The Immanent Frame, and The New Atlantis.

Storm also discussed the book in interviews with magazines, websites, and podcasts, some of which were aimed at a general audience. These included interviews with the magazine Dreamflesh, with the Marginalia podcast for the Los Angeles Review of Books, and with the Oregon Humanities Center at the University of Oregon.

== Reception ==
=== Reviews ===
The Myth of Disenchantment has been favorably reviewed in several academic publications, including Magic, Ritual, and Witchcraft, Fides et Historia, the Journal of the American Academy of Religion, and Philosophy in Review.

Writing in History of Religions, Hugh Urban called The Myth of Disenchantment "a powerful book that forces us to rethink many of our basic assumptions in the modern history of ideas", although he argued that Storm could have more closely examined the relationship between modern enchantment and capitalism.

In a review aimed at more general audiences for the magazine First Things, Peter J. Leithart praised the book and discussed some of its relevance for Christian readers, even though the book was written without a specific religious audience in mind.

=== Scholarship drawing on The Myth of Disenchantment ===
A 2019 doctoral dissertation has engaged extensively with the arguments in The Myth of Disenchantment, recognizing their significance but seeking to more deeply examine the connection between enchantment and European colonialism. A 2018 dissertation on secularization also drew on the distinction between secularization and disenchantment articulated in The Myth of Disenchantment.

Matthew Melvin-Koushki, a scholar of Islam and Islamic occultism, has cited The Myth of Disenchantment to challenge orientalizing accounts of magic in the Islamic world.

The Christian theologian Alister McGrath has also drawn on the arguments in The Myth of Disenchantment.
