= Jason Josephson Storm =

American academic, philosopher, social scientist, and author

Jason Ānanda Josephson Storm
- Born: Jason Ānanda Josephson
- Other names: Jason Storm; Jason Josephson-Storm
- Relatives: Felicitas Goodman (grandmother)
- Awards: Distinguished Book Award, Society for the Scientific Study of Religion, 2013 Award for Excellence in the Study of Religion, American Academy of Religion-– Constructive-Reflective Studies, 2022

Academic background
- Education: MTS, Harvard Divinity School, PhD Stanford University
- Alma mater: Stanford University
- Thesis: Taming Demons: The Anti-Superstition Campaign and the Invention of Religion in Japan (1853–1920) (2006)
- Academic advisors: Carl Bielefeldt; Bernard Faure; Helen Hardacre

Academic work
- Discipline: Religious studies; philosophy
- Sub-discipline: East Asian religions; theory in religious studies; European intellectual history; secularization theory, Religion and Science
- School or tradition: postcolonialism; Critical Religion; Continental Philosophy; East Asian Philosophy
- Notable works: The Invention of Religion in Japan (2012); The Myth of Disenchantment (2017)
- Notable ideas: Disenchantment is a myth; hierarchical inclusion and exclusive similarity; reflexive religious studies; trinary of superstition, secularism, and religion
- Website: Faculty profile

Jason Ānanda Josephson Storm (né Josephson) is an American academic, philosopher, social scientist, and author. He is currently Professor in the Department of Religion and chair in Science and Technology Studies at Williams College. He also holds affiliated positions in Asian studies and Comparative Literature at Williams College. Storm's research traces how religion and science have been constructed across Europe and East Asia, focusing on the period 1600 to the present, while his philosophical work engages questions of knowledge, power, and meaning. His more recent work has discussed disenchantment and philosophy of social science.

Storm has written four books and over thirty academic essays in English. He has also published articles in French and Japanese, and translated academic essays and primary sources from Japanese to English. His first book, The Invention of Religion in Japan, earned the 2013 "Distinguished Book Award" from the Society for the Scientific Study of Religion and was a finalist for the American Academy of Religion's "Best First Book" award in the History of Religions. His third book, Metamodernism: The Future of Theory, won the 2022 award for Excellence in the Study of Religion (Constructive-Reflexive Studies) by the American Academy of Religion. Benjamin G. Robinson, a scholar of religion and race, has described Storm's work as "seminal."

== Education ==
Storm earned a Master of Theological Studies degree from Harvard Divinity School in 2001. He earned a PhD in Religious Studies from Stanford University in 2006, where he studied Japanese religions under Bernard Faure, Carl Bielefeldt, and Helen Hardacre. During this time, he also researched Continental philosophy, especially post-structuralism. He was a visiting student at St Antony's College, Oxford in the 2004 academic year. Storm's doctoral dissertation was entitled "Taming Demons: The Anti-Superstition Campaign and the Invention of Religion in Japan (1853–1920)".

== Research ==
=== Japanese religions ===
Much of Storm's early writing on Japanese religions built on his doctoral research. This writing particularly examined how the categories of religion, superstition, and science came to be constructed in Meiji-era Japan. For example, the paper "When Buddhism became a 'Religion'," one of Storm's most cited papers according to Google Scholar, examined the categorization of different aspects of traditional Japanese Buddhism as religion or superstition in the work of Inoue Enryō.

In his 2012 book The Invention of Religion in Japan, Storm expanded this argument to examine how Japanese thinkers in the Meiji era adopted Western categories of religion, science, and superstition. Storm examined the origins of State Shinto in this light. The book also examined the confluence of Japanese religious thought, political theory, science, and philology in movements such as the Kokugaku.

Kevin Schilbrack has associated The Invention of Religion in Japan with "Critical Religion" or the "critical study of religion", an approach in religious studies that challenges the stability of religion as an analytical category. Other thinkers in this movement include Talal Asad and Russell T. McCutcheon. Within this field, The Invention of Religion in Japan draws on insights from postcolonial theory and has been connected to Edward Said's Orientalism and Richard King's Orientalism and Religion. At the same time, Storm complicates Said's thesis, noting in particular that Japanese scholars adapted the concept of religion to their own ends and contributed to orientalist scholarship to position Japan as a culturally and intellectually dominant force in East Asia, including over Korea during Japan's colonization of the region.

In his book introducing different concepts of religion, Benjamin Schewel claimed that Storm's work in The Invention of Religion in Japan made "major conceptual contributions" to what Schewel terms the "Construct Narrative" of the definition of religion.

Other ideas developed in The Invention of Religion in Japan have been applied more broadly in religious studies. For instance, the ideas of hierarchical inclusion and exclusive similarity, which Storm coined to describe Japanese methods of conceiving religious difference, have been applied in research on South Asian religions.

=== Magic and disenchantment ===
Storm's 2017 book The Myth of Disenchantment challenged the validity of the thesis of disenchantment in the social sciences. The book argues that social-scientific data do not support the idea of a widespread loss of belief in magic in the West. The book distinguishes between secularization and disenchantment as theoretical and sociological phenomena and argues that they have not been correlated in European history. According to Storm, these data challenge traditional definitions of modernity. Storm argues that disenchantment has come to serve as a myth in the sense of a "regulative ideal" that impacts human behavior and leads people to act as though disenchantment has occurred, even though it has not.

In addition to its sociological critique of the reality of disenchantment, The Myth of Disenchantment offered new intellectual-historical interpretations of sociological theorists commonly associated with disenchantment. The book argued that many of these thinkers, including Max Weber, James George Frazer, and Sigmund Freud, engaged with mysticism and the occult. For this reason, Storm argues, accounts of disenchantment derived from the work of these figures may need to be revised. In The Myth of Disenchantment and other academic articles, Storm also argued for a close connection between Western esotericism and the origin of religious studies as a discipline.

Around the time of The Myth of Disenchantment's publication, Storm discussed the thesis and main arguments of the book in articles for aeon.co and The Immanent Frame as well as through interviews with magazines and podcasts.

=== Theory ===
Storm has written on broader questions of epistemology and theory in religious studies. Some of his work in this field seeks to extend and generalize concepts developed in The Invention of Religion in Japan.

Building on ideas in his 2012 book, Storm has developed a trinaristic approach to examining the relationship between secularism, superstition, and religion that he argues is applicable more generally. This trinary contrasts to earlier social-scientific accounts of secularization, which tend to presuppose a binary between religion and secularism. According to Storm, the trinaristic formulation may allow for a more refined theorization of secularism, secularization, and modernity. Brill's Method & Theory in the Study of Religion devoted an issue to further discussing and applying Storm's idea in other subfields of religious studies.

Storm has also been a proponent of what he calls "Reflexive Religious Studies," inspired by the "reflexive sociology" of Pierre Bourdieu and Loïc Wacquant, which describes sociology itself in sociological terms. Reflexive Religious Studies addresses the way that "that academic social science produces feedback in culture in such a way that it produces greater coherence in the social sphere that it then studies." More specifically Reflexive Religious Studies "examine[s] those societies in which the category “religion" and its entangled differentiations (e.g., the distinction between religion and the secular) have begun to function as concepts" and it describes how the academic study of religion "actually reverberates in the religious field, revitalizing and even producing religions."

In a 2020 article for Method & Theory in the Study of Religion, Storm applied analytic philosophy of science to critique attempts to model the methods of religious studies on the natural sciences. There Storm also discussed his plans to develop a new approach to the social sciences that he terms metamodernism. This fed into his 2021 monograph, Metamodernism: The Future of Theory.

== Reception ==
The Myth of Disenchantment has been favorably reviewed in several academic publications, including Magic, Ritual, and Witchcraft, Fides et Historia, and the Journal of the American Academy of Religion.

Writing in History of Religions, Hugh Urban called The Myth of Disenchantment "a powerful book that forces us to rethink many of our basic assumptions in the modern history of ideas", although he argued that Storm could have more closely examined the relationship between modern enchantment and capitalism.

The Invention of Religion in Japan was a finalist best first book in the History of Religion at the American Academy of Religion and it won a distinguished book of the year award from the Society for the Scientific Study of Religion. It has also been favorably reviewed in Numen, the Journal of Japanese Studies, Religious Studies Review, and the Journal for the Scientific Study of Religion, among other academic publications.

A 2019 doctoral dissertation has engaged extensively with the arguments in The Myth of Disenchantment, recognizing their significance but seeking to more deeply examine the connection between enchantment and European colonialism. Matthew Melvin-Koushki, a scholar of Islam and Islamic occultism, has also cited The Myth of Disenchantment to challenge orientalizing accounts of magic in the Islamic world.

The 2017 annual AAR-SBL meeting in Boston included an "Author Meets Critics" panel devoted to The Myth of Disenchantment.

There have been multiple journal round-tables dedicated to Metamodernism: The Future of Theory (2021). Writing for Religious Studies Review, philosopher of religion, Kevin Schilbrack referred to it as "a powerhouse intervention in theorizing in the human sciences." It has also been favoribly reviewed in American Literary History, Philosophy Now, and elsewhere. Ultimately, Metamodernism won the prestigious book award for "Award for Excellence in the Study of Religion" (Constructive Reflexive Studies) from the American Academy of Religion with the jury describing it as a "theoretical tour de force."

His newest book, The Genealogy of Genealogy: Nietzsche, Foucault, and the Coils of Critical History, has been positivity received by specialists in continental philosophy. Stuart Elden, for instance, describing it as "An important contribution," and stating that "I thoroughly recommend the book to anyone interested in Foucault and Nietzsche, and I think it will have a lot to say to debates about historical methodology in the humanities and social sciences." While Enrico Beltramini writing for H-History-and-Theory, described it as "An intellectual tour de force."

== Bibliography ==
=== Books ===
- Josephson, Jason Ānanda (2012). The Invention of Religion in Japan. Chicago: University of Chicago Press. ISBN 978-0226412344.
- Josephson Storm, Jason (2017). The Myth of Disenchantment: Magic, Modernity, and the Birth of the Human Sciences. Chicago: University of Chicago Press. ISBN 978-0-226-40336-6.
- Josephson Storm, Jason Ānanda (2021). Metamodernism: The Future of Theory. Chicago: University of Chicago Press. ISBN 978-0-226-60229-5
- Josephson Storm, Jason Ānanda (2026). The Genealogy of Genealogy: Nietzsche, Foucault, and the Coils of Critical History. Chicago: University of Chicago Press. ISBN 978-0-226-84731-3

=== Select journal articles in English ===
- Josephson, Jason Ānanda (2006). "When Buddhism Became a "Religion": Religion and Superstition in the Writings of Inoue Enryō". Japanese Journal of Religious Studies. 33 (1): 143–168. JSTOR 30233795.
- Josephson, Jason Ānanda (2013). "God's Shadow: Occluded Possibilities in the Genealogy of "Religion"". History of Religions. 52 (4): 309–339. doi:10.1086/669644. S2CID 170485577.
- Josephson, Jason Ānanda (Spring 2015). "Specters of Reason: Kantian Things and the Fragile Terrors of Philosophy". J19: The Journal of Nineteenth-Century Americanists. 3 (1): 204–211. doi:10.1353/jnc.2015.0011. S2CID 159590336.
- Josephson Storm, Jason Ānanda (January 2, 2018). "The Superstition, Secularism, and Religion Trinary: Or Re-Theorizing Secularism". Method & Theory in the Study of Religion. 30 (1): 1–20. doi:10.1163/15700682-12341409.
- Josephson Storm, Jason Ânanda (July 28, 2020). "Revolutionizing the Human Sciences: A Response to Wiebe". Method & Theory in the Study of Religion. 33: 82–88. doi:10.1163/15700682-12341498. S2CID 225408949.
