= Edwin M. Yamauchi =

American historian, Christian apologist, editor (born 1937)

- Born: Edwin Masao Yamauchi; 1937 (age 88–89); Hilo, Hawaii, U.S.
- Occupations: Historian, Christian apologist, editor
- Years active: Current
- Spouse: Kimie Honda Yamauchi

Academic background
- Education: University of Hawaii

Academic work
- Discipline: Historicity of the Gospels

Edwin Masao Yamauchi (born 1937 in Hilo, Hawaii) is a Japanese-American historian, (Protestant) Christian apologist, editor and academic. He is professor emeritus of history at Miami University, where he taught from 1969 until 2005. He is married to Kimie Yamauchi (née Honda).

== Education and career ==
Yamauchi began language studies at the University of Hawaii but then transferred his candidacy to studying Biblical languages at Shelton College, Ringwood, New Jersey, and received his B.A. degree there. He then enrolled in Mediterranean studies for his Master of Arts degree at Brandeis University, and then pursued studies in Mandaean Gnostic texts as part of his Ph.D. dissertation at Brandeis University.

At Brandeis he studied under the late Cyrus H. Gordon, and expanded his linguistic studies in ancient near eastern languages, which included Hebrew, Aramaic, Akkadian, Ugaritic, Arabic, Syriac, and Coptic. In all he has immersed himself in 22 different languages. Yamauchi taught for a time at Shelton College, before becoming an assistant professor of history at Rutgers University. He then received his professorial appointment at Miami University.

Yamauchi's areas of expertise include: Ancient History, Old Testament, New Testament, Early Church History, Gnosticism, and Biblical Archaeology. He has been awarded eight fellowships, contributed chapters to several books, articles in reference works, and has published 80 essays in 37 scholarly journals. He has been a member and officer of the Institute for Biblical Research, an organization of scholars devoted to the research of the Bible.

Yamauchi has also contributed essays to various reference works in biblical studies and Christian history, and written commentaries on the books of Ezra and Nehemiah in the Expositor's Bible Commentary series that was edited by Frank Gaebelein. Yamauchi contributed the notes on Ezra and Nehemiah in the NIV Study Bible.

Other areas where Yamauchi has written include the social and cultural history of first century Christianity, the relevance of the discovery of the Dead Sea Scrolls for New Testament studies, the primary source value of Josephus' writings, and the role of the Magi in both ancient Persia and in the nativity narrative of the Gospel of Matthew. Yamauchi has written several books and essays on ancient gnosticism. He has been highly critical of scholars, such as Rudolf Bultmann, who have used third and fourth century AD Gnostic texts as primary evidence for the existence of pre-Christian gnosticism.

In the 1970s he was a prominent critic of the late Morton Smith's interpretation of an apocryphal text known as the Secret Gospel of Mark. Yamauchi revisited the corpus of Smith's writings on the topics of the lost gospels and Jesus as a magician-healer in his lengthy essay on magic and miracles (1986). Yamauchi faulted Smith's work on several points. One problem Yamauchi found was Smith's anachronistic use of third, fourth and fifth century AD Greek magical papyri sources in his reinterpretation of Christ as a magus-magician. He argued that Smith's "penchant for parallels with the life of Apollonius by Philostratus" was "historically anachronistic".

== Religious beliefs ==
Though he was raised as a Buddhist, Yamauchi was educated at Iolani, an Episcopal school. He was first exposed to evangelicalism in 1952, after being invited to attend Kalihi Union Church by a classmate. In his senior high school year Yamauchi studied at a rural school and worked at a missionary farm known as the Christian Youth Center. He is a founding member of the Oxford Bible Fellowship church in Oxford, Ohio. He was a supporter of the Inter Varsity Christian Fellowship throughout his career, and particularly at the campus of Miami University. He has contributed popular articles to periodicals such as the Christianity Today magazine on the resurrection of Christ and in response to controversial claims made about the Dead Sea Scrolls.

Yamauchi was featured in the widely read Christian apologetic work The Case for Christ by Lee Strobel. He has given presentations on the Easter story to such universities as Cornell, Yale, and Princeton. He has also appeared in various television documentaries concerning the life of Christ. Based on an interview, there is a biographical article in The Grains of Rice: Cincinnati Chapter Japanese American Citizens League, September 2001.

== Select bibliography ==
- Africa and Africans in Antiquity (editor; East Lansing: Michigan State University Press, 2001; ISBN 0-87013-507-4
- Africa and the Bible (Grand Rapids: Baker, 2004). ISBN 0-8010-2686-5
- An Asian American Ancient Historian and Biblical Scholar (Eugene, OR: Wipf and Stock, 2024). ISBN 979-8-3852-1160-9
- Archaeology and the Bible (with Donald J. Wiseman) (Grand Rapids: Zondervan, 1979). ISBN 0-310-38341-2
- The Archaeology of New Testament Cities in Western Asia Minor (Grand Rapids: Baker, 1980). ISBN 0-8010-9915-3
- "A Secret Gospel of Jesus as 'Magus'? A Review of the Recent Works of Morton Smith," Christian Scholar's Review, 4/3 (1975): 238–251.
- Chronos, Kairos, Christos: Nativity and Chronological Studies Presented to Jack Finegan (co-edited with Jerry Vardaman) (Winona Lake: Eisenbruans, 1989). ISBN 0-931464-50-1
- Composition and Cooroboration in Classical and Biblical Studies (Philadelphia: Presbyterian and Reformed Publishing, 1966).
- "The Descent of Ishtar, The Fall of Sophia, and the Jewish Roots of Gnosticism," Tyndale Bulletin, 29 (1978): 143–175.
- Foes From The Northern Frontier (Grand Rapids: Baker, 1982). ISBN 0-8010-9918-8
- Gnostic Ethics and Mandaean Origins (Cambridge, MA: Harvard University Press, 1970).
- Greece and Babylon (Grand Rapids: Baker, 1967).
- Harper's World of the New Testament (San Francisco: Harper & Row, 1981). ISBN 0-06-069708-3
- "Immanuel Velikovsky's Catastrophic History," Journal of the American Scientific Affiliation, 25/4 (December 1973): 134–139.
- "Jewish Gnosticism? The Prologue of John, Mandaean Parallels and the Trimorphic Protennoia," in Studies in Gnosticism and Hellenistic Religions, R. van den Broek and M. J. Vermaseren, eds. (Leiden: E. J. Brill, 1981): 467–497.
- "Josephus and the Scriptures" Fides et Historia, 13/1 (Fall 1980): 42–63.
- "Magic or Miracle? Diseases, Demons and Exorcisms," in Gospel Perspectives Vol. 6: The Miracles of Jesus, David Wenham and Craig Blomberg, eds. (Sheffield: JSOT Press, 1986): 89–183.
- Mandaic Incantation Texts (New Haven: American Oriental Society, 1967).
- Peoples of the Old Testament World, (co-edited with Alfred J. Hoerth and Gerald L. Mattingly) (Grand Rapids: Baker, 1994) ISBN 0-8010-4383-2
- Persia and the Bible (Grand Rapids: Baker, 1990). ISBN 0-8010-9899-8
- Pre-Christian Gnosticism: A Survey of the Proposed Evidences (Grand Rapids: William B. Eerdmans, 1973) ISBN 0-8028-3429-9 (Revised edition, Grand Rapids: Baker, 1983) ISBN 0-8010-9919-6
- "Pre-Christian Gnosticism in the Nag Hammadi Texts?" Church History, 48 (1979): 129–141.
- "The Present Status of Mandaean Studies," Journal of Near Eastern Studies, 25 (1966): 88–96.
- The Stones and The Scriptures (Philadelphia: J. B. Lippincott, 1972) ISBN 0-87981-002-5
- The Story of the Church (with Robert G. Clouse and Richard V. Pierard) (Chicago: Moody Press, 2002) ISBN 0-8024-2481-3
- "Tammuz and the Bible," Journal of Biblical Literature, 84 (1965): 283–290.
- Two Kingdoms: The Church and Culture Through the Ages (with Robert G. Clouse and Richard V. Pierard) (Chicago: Moody Press, 1993). ISBN 0-8024-8590-1
- Ramm's View of Scripture ... at Best a Compromise in The Outlook, Vol. 5, Issue 4, 1955.
- Is Theistic Evolution in Accord with the Christian Conception of the Origin of Things? in The Outlook, Vol. 11, Issue 8, 1962.
- Problems of Radiocarbon Dating and of Cultural Diffusion in Pre-history, in Journal of the American Scientific Affiliation, (March 1975): 25–31

== Reviews ==
- Molefi K. Asante, "Africa and Africans in Antiquity (review)", Research in African Literatures, 34/3, (Fall 2003): pp. 178–182.
- Grant LeMarquand, Africa and the Bible, Anglican Theological Review, Fall 2005
