= Stuart Piggin =

Australian historian

Stuart Piggin is an Australian historian of Christianity. He is director of the Centre for the History of Christian Thought and Experience at Macquarie University. According to Rebecca Abbott, writing for Eternity, Piggin has been "rewriting our nation's history" with the aim of putting "Christianity back into Australia's past."

Piggin studied at the University of Sydney, the University of London, and the Melbourne College of Divinity. He taught at the University of Wollongong and the University of Sydney from 1974 to 1990. Piggin then served as Master of Robert Menzies College from 1990 to 2004. In 2004, a Festschrift was published in his honour: Making History for God: Essays on Evangelicalism, Revival and Mission: In Honour of Stuart Piggin, Master of Robert Menzies College, 1990-2004. He is a Fellow of the Royal Historical Society.

Piggin wrote Evangelical Christianity in Australia: Spirit, Word and Work (Oxford University Press, 1996). The Fountain of Public Prosperity: Evangelical Christians in Australian History 1740–1914 (co-authored with Robert Linder) won Australian Christian Book of the Year in 2019.

Piggin received an honorary Doctor of Theology degree from the Australian College of Theology in 2023.
