= Ilia Delio =

American Catholic nun and scientist

Sister Ilia Delio O.S.F.

Personal details
- Born: Newark, New Jersey, U.S.
- Denomination: Roman Catholic
- Occupation: Franciscan sister; university professor; author; scientist
- Education: DeSales University (BS); Seton Hall University (MS); Rutgers University (PhD); Fordham University (MA, PhD)

Ilia Delio, OSF is an American Franciscan sister, theologian, author, and academic. In 2026, she retired from the Josephine C. Connelly Endowed Chair of Theology at Villanova University. She currently serves as executive director of the World Institute for Science, Religion and Culture (formerly the Center for Christogenesis), which she founded as an online educational resource. It builds upon the vision of Teilhard de Chardin and the integration of science, religion and technology.

== Education ==
Delio earned a Bachelor of Science degree in biology at DeSales University (then Allentown College) and a master's degree in biology at Seton Hall University. She completed a doctorate in pharmacology at Rutgers University, New Jersey Medical School. Delio specialized in neuropharmacology and focused on neuromuscular disease. She gave up a postdoctoral fellowship at Johns Hopkins University in research on Alzheimer's disease, in order to enter a Carmelite monastery. She later joined a Franciscan community. After Delio entered the Franciscans, she enrolled at Rutgers University for a postdoctoral fellowship in neurotoxicology, where she researched heavy metal toxicity and nerve damage.

During her formation period in the Franciscan community, Delio attended Fordham University, earning a master's degree in theology and a doctorate in historical theology.

== Career ==
After graduation from Fordham, she taught science and religion at Trinity College in Hartford, Connecticut. She then served as Professor and Chair of Spirituality Studies at Washington Theological Union for 12 years, where she taught Franciscan theology and spirituality, science and religion, and the history of Christianity. Delio then accepted a post as a Senior Research Fellow at Georgetown University's Woodstock Theological Center, focusing on science, religion and technology. After Woodstock closed in June 2013, she became the Haub Director of Catholic Studies at Georgetown University, before moving to Villanova. Delio speaks both nationally and internationally on topics such as quantum physics, artificial intelligence, evolution, and the importance and relevance of these fields for Christianity. She is the recipient of a Templeton Course Award in Science and Religion and holds four honorary degrees from Saint Francis University (Loretto, PA), Sacred Heart University (Fairfield, CT), Catholic Theological Union (Chicago, IL), and Holy Family University (Philadelphia, PA). She is a Fellow of the International Society for Science and Religion. She also serves on the Board of Innovation for the Institute for Advanced Studies at Goethe University, Frankfurt, Germany, and is a Fellow of the Institute for the Study of Science and Religion (UK).

== Books ==
Delio's 27 books include The Hours of the Universe: Reflections on God, Science and the Human Journey, which won a 2022 Nautilus Book Award (gold), and The Unbearable Wholeness of Being: God, Evolution, and the Power of Love, winner of the 2014 Nautilus Award (silver) and a Catholic Press Association Book Award. Selected other books include Care for Creation: A Franciscan Spirituality of the Earth (Catholic Press Book Award 2010), The Emergent Christ: Exploring the Meaning of Catholic in an Evolutionary Universe (Catholic Press Book Award 2013), and Making All Things New: Catholicity, Cosmology and Consciousness. The latter was nominated for the 2017 Grawemeyer Award at the University of Louisville. It was also a finalist for the United Kingdom’s 2019 Michael Ramsey Prize for theological writing. Many of her books have been translated into such languages as Spanish, Italian, German, Portuguese, and Polish.

In 2015 Delio launched a new Orbis Books series as its general editor, Catholicity in an Evolving Universe. There are ten books in the series as of 2023.

Her thinking and writing considers artificial Intelligence and religion, relational holism, panpsychism, evolution, human becoming, and theogenesis. Her most recent books include The Christian Mutation: Reclaiming the God of Jesus (Orbis, 2026); Whitehead and Teilhard: From Organism to Omega (Orbis, 2025); and The Not-Yet God: Carl Jung, Teilhard de Chardin and the Relational Whole (Orbis, 2023).
