= Robert Clouse (academic) =

American religion academic (1931–2016)

Robert G. Clouse
- Born: August 26, 1931; Mansfield, Ohio, U.S.
- Died: May 8, 2016 (aged 84); Terre Haute, Indiana, U.S.
- Education: Bryan College (B.A. History, 1954); Grace Theological Seminary (B.D., 1957); University of Iowa (M.A. 1960; Ph.D. 1963)
- Occupation: Historian · Religious studies scholar · Educator · Pastor
- Years active: 1956–2016
- Organizations: Indiana State University; Conference on Faith and History (founding member)
- Known for: Leading expert in Christian eschatology; longtime professor at Indiana State University
- Notable work: The Meaning of the Millennium (1977); Two Kingdoms: The Church and Culture Through the Ages (1993, with Pierard & Yamauchi)
- Spouse: Bonnidell Barrows (m. 1955–2016)
- Children: Two

Robert G. Clouse (August 26, 1931 – May 8, 2016) was an American religious academic who was a professor at Indiana State University, Terre Haute, Indiana.

== Education and career ==
Robert G. Clouse was born in Mansfield, Ohio on August 26, 1931. He began his education at Ashland College and received his BA in history from Bryan College. He earned his BD from Grace Theological Seminary in 1957. Clouse was awarded his MA in 1960 and PhD in 1963 from the University of Iowa.

Clouse taught history at several colleges and universities, spending the bulk of his career at Indiana State University. He was visiting professor at the University of Illinois, Indiana University, and Juniata College, where he was the J. Omar Good Visiting Professor of Christianity.

In addition to his academic career, Clouse served as pastor of several Grace Brethren Church congregations in both Iowa and Illinois. He also led the congregation of the Brethren Church in Clay City, Indiana.

Clouse was considered a leading expert in millennial thought and eschatological studies, having presented over 18 major lectures, and written more than 5 books on the subject. His The Meaning of the Millennium (1977) was a best seller. His most recent book, The End of Days, published by Sky Light Paths in 2007, explores apocalyptic literature, Biblical and Hebrew scriptures, writings of the Church Fathers and radical movements throughout history. Included is an assessment of current popular literature on the subject, including The Late Great Planet Earth, and the Left Behind series.

In addition to his millennial studies, Clouse contributed articles and chapters in numerous books on Christian Church history, Renaissance and Reformation history, and war and peace studies. His most important work as a historian of Christianity was Two Kingdoms: The Church and Culture Through the Ages (1993), which he coauthored with Richard V. Pierard and Edwin Yamauchi. He was the author or coauthor of Puritans, the Millennium and the Future of Israel (1970), The Cross and the Flag (1972), The Church in an Age of Orthodoxy and Enlightenment (1980), War, Four Christian Views (1981) and Women in Ministry, Four Views (1989).

Clouse was a founder of the Conference on Faith and History, member of the editorial board of the Brethren Encyclopedia, and contributing editor of the New Twentieth Century Encyclopedia of Religious Knowledge. He wrote and presented papers on a variety of subjects throughout the US and in Europe.

== Personal life ==
Having received a heart transplant in 1985 when the procedure was still considered quite risky, Clouse worked for organ transplant groups to encourage donation. His case was widely publicized in religious, as well as medical publications.

Clouse served Indiana State University in a variety of positions, including President of the Faculty Senate on four occasions. He received the ISU Faculty Distinguished Service Award in 2000, and the Creativity and Research Award in 1986. He was a member of the Board of Directors of the Eugene V. Debs Foundation and received the Indiana Heart Association Life Achievement Award in 1987.

Clouse died on May 8, 2016, at the age of 84.

== Select bibliography ==
- The Meaning of the Millennium, editor and contributor. (Downers Grove, IL: Intervarsity Press, 1977). Translated into German, Portuguese, Chinese, Spanish, and Korean
- Streams of Civilization, Vol II, co-author Richard Pierard. (Milford, Michigan: Mott Media, 1980)
- The Church in an Age of Orthodoxy and Enlightenment 1600–1800. (St. Louis: Concordia Publishing House, 1980)
- War. Four Christian Views, editor and contributor. (Downers Grove, IL: Intervarsity Press, 1989). Translated into German
- Women in Ministry, Four Views, editor with Bonidell Clouse and contributor. (Downers Grove, IL: Intervarsity Press, 1989). Translated into Portuguese and Chinese.
- Two Kingdoms, The Church and Culture through the Ages, co-authors Richard Pierard and Edwin Yamauchi. (Chicago: Moody Press, 1993).
- The End of Days: Essential Selections from Apocalyptic Texts Annotated and Explained. (Woodstock, VT: SkyLight Paths Publishing, 2007)
- “Johann Heinrich Alsted & English Millennialism”, The Harvard Theological Review 62 (Spring, 1969), pp 189–201.
- “Robert Owen and the Millennialist Tradition”, Robert Owen's American Legacy, ed. Donald Pitzer (Indianapolis: Indiana Historical Society, 1972), pp. 43–56.
- “John Napier and Apocalyptic Thought”, The Sixteenth Century Journal Vol. V No. 1 (April, 1974), pp. 101–114.
- “Freud’s Psychohistory of Leonardo da Vinci: A Matter of Being Right or Left”, The Journal of Interdisciplinary History, Vol. XIII No. 1 (Summer, 1982), pp. 3–16.
- “The New Christian Right, America and the Kingdom of God”, Christian Scholar's Review, Vol. XII, No. 1 (1983), pp. 3–16.
- “Premillennialist Christology, Nonresistance, and the Believer’s Church”, Restoration Quarterly 28 (Fall, 1986).
- “The Millennium that Survived the Fifth Monarchy Men”, ed. J. Friedman, Regnum, Religio et Ratio (Kirksville, MO: Sixteenth Century Publishers, 1987), pp. 9–30.
- “A Little Victory over Death, Reflections on Organ Transplants”, Christianity Today 32, 5 (March, 1988) pp. 17–23. Reprinted as “I Have Another Man’s Heart”, Catholic Digest 52, 9 pp. 40–45.
- “The Church of the Brethren and World War I: The Goshen Statement”, Mennonite Life Vol 45, No. 4 (December, 1990), pp. 29–36.
- “The Christian Hope: A History of the Interpretation of the Millennium”, New Testament Essays in Honor of Homer A. Kent, Jr., ed. Gary T. Meadors (Winona Lake, IN: BMH Books, 1991), pp. 203–219.
- “Slavery, Pacifism and War”, Nonviolent America, History Through the Eyes of Peace, ed. L. Hawkley & J.C. Juhnke (North Newton, KS: Mennonite Press, 1993), pp. 82–90.
- “Herbert Butterfield”, Historians of the Christian Tradition: Their Methodology and Influence on Western Thought, ed. M. Bauman & M.I. Klauber (Nashville: Broadman and Holman Publishers, 1995), pp. 519–531.
- “Evangelicalism Before and After the Scopes Trial”, Creation of an Evolving Controversy: A Symposium on the 70th Anniversary of the Scopes Trial (Dayton, TN: Bryan College, 1996), pp. 11–16.
- “Diversity, Christianity, and Higher Education”, Should God Get Tenure? Essays on Religion and Higher Education, ed. D.W. Gill (Grand Rapids: William B. Eerdmans, 1997), pp. 103–115.
- “Scholarship as Prophecy: The Beloved City of Johann Heinrich Alsted”, Habent sua fata libelli, Books Have Their Own Destiny (Kirksville, MO: Thomas Jefferson University Press, 1998), pp. 27–38.
- “Prophecy for the People: The Significance of the Eschatology of Hal Lindsey for the Believers Church”, Apocalypticism and Millennialism, Shaping a Believers Church Eschatology for the Twenty-First Century, ed. Loren L. Johns (Scottdale, PA: Herald Press, 2000), pp. 342–353.
