= Religion (journal) =

- Discipline: Religious studies
- Language: English
- Edited by: Michael Stausberg; Steven Engler

Publication details
- History: 1971–present
- Publisher: Routledge (United Kingdom)
- Frequency: Quarterly

Standard abbreviations
- ISO 4: Religion

Indexing
- ISSN: 0048-721X (print); 1096-1151 (web)
- LCCN: 76615899
- OCLC no.: 186359943

Links
- Journal homepage

Religion is a peer-reviewed academic journal in the field of religious studies, edited by the religion academic scholars Michael Stausberg and Steven Engler. It was founded in 1971, with close ties to the Religious Studies program at the University of Lancaster. That program was founded and chaired by Ninian Smart, and he served as the chairman of the first editorial board. Four companies have published the journal over the years: Oriel Press (1971–72), Routledge & Kegan Paul (1973–80), Academic Press (1981–2000), Elsevier (2001–2010), and currently Routledge.

Religion publishes academic work on all issues of Religious Studies, including the history, literature, thought, practise, material culture, and institutions of particular religious traditions from a variety of perspectives such as social scientific, humanistic, cognitive, economical, geographical, etc. (but excluding work that falls purely within the areas of theology or philosophy of religion). The journal has European and North-American editors (currently Michael Stausberg and Steven Engler) and a multi-national editorial board.

== Abstracting and indexing ==
The journal is abstracted in: Arts & Humanities Citation Index, ATLA (American Theological Library Association), International Bibliography of the Social Sciences, Dietrich's Index Philosophicus, Academic Search, Current Abstracts, Humanities International Index, New Testament Abstracts, Old Testament Abstracts, SocINDEX, TOC Premier, SCOPUS, Gale, Humanities Index, Russian Academy of Sciences Bibliographies, ProQuest, Current Contents.

== See also ==
- List of humanities journals
