= Terence Keel =

American author

- Known for: The Coroner's Silence: Death Records and the Hidden Victims of Police Violence (Beacon Press, 2025), Divine Variations: How Christian Thought Became Racial Science (Stanford University Press, 2018)

Academic background
- Education: Xavier University of Louisiana (BA); Harvard Divinity School (MA); Harvard Graduate School of Arts and Sciences (PhD)

Academic work
- Institutions: University of California, Los Angeles
- Website: Official website

Terence Keel is an American author and full professor at University of California, Los Angeles, holding dual-appointments within the Institute for Society and Genetics and the Department of African American Studies.

== Early life ==
Terence Keel was born in Sacramento, California. He attended Laguna Creek High School in Elk Grove, CA and was raised in a Black Pentecostal church in south Sacramento.

== Career ==
Keel earned a Bachelor of Arts in theology from Xavier University of Louisiana. At Xavier he became a student in the department of Theology which introduced him to liberation theology and the works of James Cone, Albert J. Raboteau, and Charles H. Long. He then attended Harvard Divinity School, earning a Masters of Theological Studies in 2005. In 2012 Keel received a PhD from the Committee on the Study of Religion at Harvard Graduate School of Arts and Sciences where he worked with Janet Browne, Amy Hollywood, Evelyn Higginbotham, and Noah Feldman. As a doctoral student Keel earned awards from the National Science Foundation, the Social Science Research Council, and the Charles Warren Center for American Studies.

In 2012 Keel joined the faculty at UC Santa Barbara where he was appointed in the Department of Black Studies and the Department of History. Keel would eventually become Vice Chair in the Department of History. In 2018 Keel became the first Black Studies professor to earn the Harold J. Plous Award, the highest honor given to a junior faculty at UC Santa Barbara in recognition for extraordinary scholarship, teaching, and campus service. During that same year Keel published Divine Variations: How Christian Thought Became Racial Science with Standard University Press. Keel argues that the persistence of race in the fields of anthropology, medicine, and biology is the result of enduring beliefs and value commitments that stem from the religious, intellectual, and political history of Europe and America. Divine Variations won the 2021 Iris Book Award and was the winner of the 2018 Choice Award for Outstanding Academic Title, sponsored by the American Library Association.

Keel left UC Santa Barbara in 2018 to join UCLA, where he was appointed to the Department of African American Studies and the UCLA Institute for Society & Genetics. He regularly teaches courses on the history of scientific racism, contemporary issues in public health, the interplay of science and religion, and posthumanism. During the 2020–2021 academic year, Keel was the associate director of the Ralph J. Bunche Center for African American Studies and also associate director of Critical Theory in the Center for the Study of Racism, Social Justice and Health in the UCLA Fielding School of Public Health. Keel currently serves as the Advisor for Structural Competency and Innovation for the Standardized Patient Program in the David Geffen School of Medicine at UCLA.

Keel founded the BioCritical Studies (BCS) Lab at UCLA to investigate how vulnerable people embody legal, political, and economic conditions that shorten life. In his BCS Lab, Keel studies law enforcement related death in the United States and the practices of the medical examiner-coroner system. Keel’s BCS lab has collaborated with the Los Angeles-based social justice organization Dignity and Power Now, Dr. Lauren Brown of the University of Southern California, Professor Aziza Ahmed of Boston University School of Law, and the legal nonprofit Civil Rights Corps, founded by Alec Karakatsanis.

In 2023, Keel’s lab co-authored a report analyzing aggregate data on 180 deaths inside 10 jail facilities in the state of Maryland. The report was featured in an investigative story by The Washington Post.

In 2025, Keel published The Coroner's Silence: Death Records and the Hidden Victims of Police Violence with Beacon Press. The book is a groundbreaking investigation revealing how coroners and forensic systems often obscure state-sanctioned violence, exposing systemic failures that shield law enforcement from accountability for in-custody deaths. It was named a finalist for the 2026 PROSE Award in Legal Studies and Criminology.

Keel’s work in Los Angeles has been covered by ABC News Live, Spectrum News, LAist, Los Angeles Daily News, and Los Angeles Public Press, among others.

== Awards ==
- Harold J. Plous Award (2017)
- 2021 Iris Book Award
- Luskin Center for History and Policy Award.
- Robert Wood Johnson Interdisciplinary Research Award 2021-2023
- National Institute of Health, National Library of Medicine Research Award 2022-2025
- Finalist for the 2026 PROSE Award in Legal Studies and Criminology.

== Books ==
- The Coroner's Silence: Death Records and the Hidden Victims of Police Violence (Boston, MA: Beacon Press, 2025).
- Divine Variations: How Christian Thought Became Racial Science (Stanford, CA: Stanford University Press, 2018).
- Critical Approaches to Science and Religion ed. Myrna Perez, Terence Keel, and Ahmed Ragab, (New York, NY: Columbia University Press, 2022)
