= The Conference on Faith and History =

Christian organization for history

The Conference on Faith and History (CFH) is an organization for Christians working in the historical profession. It was founded in 1967 by a group of evangelical Christian historians who had been meeting for several years for fellowship and an interest in discussing the relationship between faith and history. The CFH meets biennially during the fall of even years for a scholarly conference.

== Activities ==
The CFH has added a student conference. Each winter the CFH gathers for a breakfast session including a themed panel during the annual meeting of the American Historical Association, of which it is an affiliate. The CFH publishes a biannual journal entitled Fides et Historia, which contains scholarly articles on religious history, various issues surrounding the relationship between Christian faith and historical study, and book reviews of interest to the membership. The organization is overseen by a board of directors elected by the membership, which includes a president and vice-president. The administration of the CFH membership is run by the history department at Huntington University in Huntington, Indiana.

== Constitution ==
The original constitution adopted at Greenville College in Greenville, Illinois in the fall of 1967, listed the purpose of the CFH as the following: 1) "To encourage evangelical Christian scholars to explore the relationship of their faith to historical studies"; 2) "To provide a forum for discussion of philosophies of history and to survey current scholarship and foster research in the general area of faith and history"; and 3) "To establish more effective means of interaction between historians associated with religiously oriented and non-sectarian institutions of higher learning."
