= Oxford Handbook of the Study of Religion =

2016 book on the study of religion

The Oxford Handbook of the Study of Religion
- First edition
- Author: Michael Stausberg & Steven Engler
- Language: English
- Subject: Religious studies
- Publisher: Oxford Univ. Press
- Publication date: 2016
- ISBN: 9780198729570
- OCLC: 967944615

The Oxford Handbook of the Study of Religion is a scholarly book about the academic study of religion. Edited by Michael Stausberg and Steven Engler, the book was published in the United Kingdom in 2016. The book has been reviewed in professional journals.
