= Michael Reiss =

British bioethicist, educator, and priest (born 1960)

Michael J. Reiss FRSA FRSB (born 1960) is a British bioethicist, educator, journalist, and Anglican priest. Reiss is professor of science education at the Institute of Education, University College London, where he is assistant director, research and development.

== Family ==
Reiss's father was an obstetrician; his mother, a midwife. His father was Jewish; his mother, an agnostic. Reiss had a secular upbringing in north London.

== Career ==
He began his career as a schoolteacher at Hills Road Sixth Form College, Cambridge in 1983. In 1989, he became a lecturer and tutor in the Department of Education at the University of Cambridge. At the age of 29, Reiss began training for ministry in the Church of England with the East Anglian Ministerial Training Course: he was ordained in the Church of England as a deacon in 1990 and as a priest in 1991. For many years, he led the Sunday service in his local village near Cambridge. He was a senior lecturer at Cambridge until 1998, then reader in education and bioethics until 2000. From 2003, he was chief executive of the Science Learning Centre in London.

From 2006 to 2008, he was director of education at the Royal Society, a position he resigned on 16 September 2008, following protests about his views on tackling creationism when teaching evolution in schools, which the Royal Society said were "open to misinterpretation".

Reiss works in the fields of science education, bioethics, and sex education. He has a special interest in the ethical implications of genetic engineering. He was formerly head of the School of Mathematics, Science, and Technology at the Institute of Education, University College London. In science education, he currently directs projects funded by the Department for Children, Schools and Families, including a longitudinal, ethnographic study of pupils' learning, currently in its eleventh year.

Reiss is a frequent consultant to the Royal Society, the Qualifications and Curriculum Authority, the Training and Development Agency for Schools (formerly known as the Teacher Training Agency or the TTA) and other organisations. He serves on the editorial board of the International Journal of Science Education. He was a specialist adviser to the House of Lords Select Committee on Animals in Scientific Procedures, 2001–02, and is a member of the Farm Animal Welfare Council.

As early as November 2006, Reiss suggested that, rather than dismissing creationism as a "misconception," teachers should take the time to explain why creationism had no scientific basis. In September 2008, his views were presented in some media reports as lending support to teaching creationism as a legitimate point of view; however both he and the Royal Society later stated that this was a misrepresentation. Reiss stressed that the topic should not be taught as science, but rather should be construed as a cultural "Worldview." Reiss argued that it was more effective to engage with pupils' ideas about creationism, rather than to obstruct discussion with those who do not accept the scientific version of the evolution of species.

In July 2009, he led a number of the UK's most senior scientists in writing to the Schools Secretary Ed Balls to complain that Ofsted's proposed new curriculum for primary schools did not mention evolution.

In 2010 Reiss debated Michael Behe on the topic of Intelligent Design.

In 2022, he was elected a member of the Academia Europaea.
