= Michael Stausberg =

German scholar on religion (born 1966)

Michael Stausberg (born 28 April 1966) is a German scholar on religion.

He was born in Köln. He studied in Bonn, Tübingen, Bergen and Rome. He is now a professor at the University of Bergen, Norway.

Apart from Zoroastrianism, Zoroastrian priesthood in contemporary India and related topics, Stausberg's interests encompass the history and terminology of the scientific study of religion, ritual & ritual theory, and religion & modern tourism.

In 2012 he was elected fellow of the Norwegian Academy of Science and Letters.

== Academic career ==
He received his M.A. from University of Bonn in 1991 and received his Dr. phil. from University of Bonn in 1995. He became a Docent at the University of Uppsala in 2000 and became a Privat Dozent at the University of Heidelberg in 2003. Between 1992-1995 he had the Graduiertenkolleg Scholarship for „Interkulturelle religiöse bzw. religionsgeschichtliche Studien“ (University of Bonn). Between 1996-2000 he had the Feodor Lynen Scholarship of the Alexander von Humboldt-Stiftung (University of Uppsala).

He became Professor in the scientific study of religion at the University of Bergen in 2004. Between 2005-2007 he was Director for the scientific study of religion at the University of Berge.

== Selected bibliography ==
- Riter och ritteorier. Religionshistoriska diskussioner och teoretiska ansatser (2002)
- Die Religion Zarathushtras. Geschichte - Gegenwart - Rituale. 3 Volumes, Stuttgart: Kohlhammer Verlag
  - Volume 1, 2002, ISBN 3-17-017118-6
  - Volume 2, 2002, ISBN 3-17-017119-4
  - Volume 3, 2004, ISBN 3-17-017120-8
- Zoroastrian Rituals in Context (2004) (ed.)
- Zarathustra und seine Religion (2005)
- Theorizing Rituals (2006/7) (co-editor)
- Contemporary Theories of Religion (2009) (ed.)
- Religion and Tourism (2010)
- Defining Magic: A Reader (co-editor)
- Routledge Handbook of Research Methods in the Study of Religion. (2014) (ed.)
- The Wiley Blackwell Companion to Zoroastrianism (2015) (co-editor)
- Oxford Handbook of the Study of Religion (2016) (co-editor)
- 21st Century Theories of Religion (2025)
- Theories of Religion (1966-2024): A Critical Primer (2026)

== Other academic activities ==
- Co-editor (with Steven Engler) of the journal Religion
- Co-editor (with Gustavo Benavides) of the book-series Religion and Reason: Theory in the Study of Religion (Walter de Gruyter)
