= Steven Engler (religion scholar) =

Canadian scholar (born 1962)

- Born: Steven Joseph Engler; 1962 (age 63–64); British Columbia, Canada

Academic background
- Education: University of British Columbia; University of Toronto; Concordia University
- Thesis: The Devil's Poor and the Invisible City (1998)
- Doctoral advisor: Michel Despland

Academic work
- Discipline: Religious studies
- Institutions: Mount Royal University
- Main interests: Christianity in Latin America; religion in Brazil; theories of religion
- Website: stevenengler.ca

Steven Joseph Engler (born 1962) is a Canadian scholar of religion, Professor at Mount Royal University, collaborating Professor in the Graduate Program in Religious Studies at the Pontifical Catholic University of São Paulo (Brazil), and affiliate Professor in the Department of Religion at Concordia University.

Engler is the co-editor of leading journals and book series in the field of religious studies. In his work, he has analyzed major publications of the field and the academic landscape of religious studies in Latin America. His research focuses on Christianity in Latin America, especially Brazil, and on related religions such as Kardecism and Umbanda. His work on theories of religion engages semantic holism, a philosophical position in the area of semantics. Engler is fluent in English and Portuguese, along with being intermediate in French, Spanish, and Italian.

== Biography ==
Engler was born and raised in the interior of British Columbia. He received a Bachelor of Arts degree in philosophy from the University of British Columbia in 1986; a Master of Arts degree in philosophy from the University of Toronto in 1989; and a Doctor of Philosophy degree in religion from Concordia University in 1999.

When he was 15 years old he travelled to Brazil as an exchange student.

== Professional activities ==
- Co-editor (with Michael Stausberg) of the journal Religion.
- Co-editor (with Michael Stausberg) of the Oxford Handbook of the Study of Religion
- Co-editor (with Bettina E. Schmidt) of Handbook of Contemporary Religions in Brazil (Brill)
- Co-editor (with Michael Stausberg) of The Routledge Handbook of Research Methods in the Study of Religion
- Co-editor of the Numen book series, Studies in the History of Religions (Brill).
- Co-editor of the Religion in the Americas book series (Brill).
- Editor of the NAASR book series Key Thinkers in the Study of Religion (Routledge).
- Member of the editorial board of the Brazilian journal Horizonte
