= Robert Menzies College =

Residential college at Macquarie University

- Macquarie University
- Location: 136 Herring Road, North Ryde NSW, Sydney
- Coordinates: 33°46′39″S 151°07′00″E
- Motto: Vera Cogitate
- Established: 1972
- Named for: Sir Robert Menzies
- Status: Anglican college
- Master: Peter Davis
- Residents: 312
- Website: Robert Menzies College

Robert Menzies College (RMC) is an Anglican residential college of Macquarie University. Established in 1972, the college was named after former Prime Minister Sir Robert Menzies. Its Latin motto is Vera Cogitate, and the college's stated mission is "Forming the person, transforming the world."

For the first 40 years of its history, RMC was home to around 200 students in four interconnected buildings. With the addition of a new state of the art building in 2012 Robert Menzies College now accommodates a maximum of 312 residents. As of 2013, six permanent staff members live on site at RMC, including the Master, the Dean, and the Anglican Chaplain to Macquarie University.

The current master of RMC is Peter Davis, a specialist in residential colleges and a former lecturer in theology. Stuart Piggin served as Master from 1990 to 2004.

RMC is an Anglican college and it hosts a chapel on its grounds. The chapel is the home of Trinity Chapel Macquarie, an evangelical Christian congregation. Members of RMC are not expected to be Christians—in fact most are not, and they are not required to attend religious services. Members do, however, agree to abide by certain community standards while on RMC premises, such as not consuming alcohol.
