= Mariano Artigas =

Spanish physicist

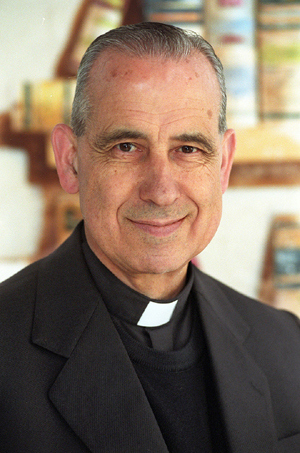
Mariano Artigas

Mariano Artigas (1938–2006) was a Spanish physicist, philosopher, and theologian. He wrote The Mind of the Universe: Understanding Science and Religion and fifteen other books on science and religion.

He was a member of the European Society for the Study of Science and Theology and the Académie Internationale de Philosophie des Sciences. He was Consultor of the Pontifical Council for Dialogue with Non-Believers.

In 2002, jointly with other professors, he created the Science, Reason and Faith Research Group (CRYF), based in the University of Navarra, where he taught. The aim of the group is to promote the interdisciplinary study of issues where science, philosophy and theology intertwine.

He held Ph.D.s in physics, philosophy, and theology.

He was ordained a priest on 9 August 1964, and incardinated to the Opus Dei prelature. He was the Dean of the Ecclesiastical Faculty of Philosophy for the University of Navarre from 1988 to 1998.

== Works ==
Professor Artigas published more than 150 articles based on the relationship of science, philosophy, and theology.

His book The Mind of the Universe, Understanding Science and Religion received good reviews, among which is that of Contemporary Physics: Artigas "has raised the level of the contemporary debate on the relations between science and religion and provided a sure guide to their complexities. He seems to have read almost every book on the subject, and gives judicious and sympathetic accounts even of views he does not share. As a scientist himself, he does full justice to the value of science and to the subtleties of the scientific method."

His other well-known works in English are:

- Oracles of Science: Celebrity Scientists versus God and Religion – with Karl Giberson (December 28, 2006)
- Galileo Observed: Science and the Politics of Belief – with William R. Shea (October 6, 2006)
- Knowing Things for Sure: Science and Truth – with Alan McCone (July 28, 2006)
- Negotiating Darwin: The Vatican Confronts Evolution, 1877–1902 (Medicine, Science, and Religion in Historical Context) – with Thomas F. Glick and Rafael A. Martínez (August 17, 2006)
