= Historically Speaking (journal) =

Academic journal

- Discipline: History
- Language: English
- Edited by: Joseph S. Lucas, Donald A. Yerxa, and Randall Stephens

Publication details
- History: 1999-2014
- Publisher: Johns Hopkins University Press (United States)
- Frequency: 5/year

Standard abbreviations
- ISO 4: Hist. Speak.

Indexing
- ISSN: 1941-4188 (print); 1944-6438 (web)
- OCLC no.: 44903985

Links
- Journal homepage; Online archive; Online access

Historically Speaking was an academic journal and the official bulletin of The Historical Society in Boston, Massachusetts. It stopped publication in 2014. Prior to that it was published five times per year by the Johns Hopkins University Press.
