= Fides et Historia =

- Language: English
- Edited by: Elesha Coffman

Publication details
- History: 1968–present
- Publisher: The Conference on Faith and History
- Frequency: Semi-annually

Standard abbreviations
- ISO 4: Fides Hist.

Indexing
- ISSN: 0884-5379
- OCLC no.: 643815799

Links
- Journal homepage

Fides et Historia is a semi-annual peer-reviewed academic journal concerning the "intersection of Christian faith and historical inquiry". It is published by The Conference on Faith and History. It is edited by Elesha Coffman.

== Additional Reading ==
Tucker, John Mark. 2005. “Fides et Historia: Christian Sources for the Professional Contributions of Donald G. Davis, Jr.” Libraries & Culture 40 (3): 460–74.
