= James B. Stump =

American author and philosopher

James B. Stump (born 1969) is an American philosopher, author, and podcast host. He is Vice President of Programs at BioLogos and host of their podcast Language of God. Formerly, he was a professor of philosophy and the chief academic officer at Bethel University (Indiana). In recognition of his contributions to the field of science and religion, Stump was elected as a fellow to the International Society for Science and Religion in 2020.

== Career ==
Stump earned a B.A. in Science Education from Bethel University (Indiana) in 1991, then taught at Kabala Rupp Memorial School in Sierra Leone, West Africa. He went to graduate school for philosophy in 1993, earning an M.A. from Northern Illinois University in 1995 and a Ph.D. from Boston University in 2000.

He started teaching at Bethel University in 1998, helping to create a new philosophy program. He was chosen by students and faculty as "Professor of the Year" for 2002-03. In the fall of 2003 he was asked to fill in as the chief academic officer, then assigned to the role permanently in 2004 as Vice President for Academic Services. Stump was elected to the first class of the South Bend Regional Chamber's 40 Under 40, which recognizes the career achievements of young professionals.

After resigning from the administration and returning to the teaching faculty in 2008, Stump founded an honors group for students called B.U.I.L.D. (Bethel Undergraduate Intellectual Leadership Development) with the goal to "infect the rest of the campus with intellectual awareness." In 2013 he accepted a part-time position with BioLogos as their content manager, splitting his time between the two organizations. In 2015 he had to resign from Bethel University because of a conflict over evolutionary theory and has worked full-time at BioLogos since then.

== Controversy Over Evolution ==
Bethel University was founded by the Missionary Church, a denomination that asserts a historical Adam and Eve who were "created by a direct act of God as recorded in Genesis and not by a process of evolution." After the arrival of new president Gregg Chenoweth in 2013, a series of meetings began between faculty, administrators, board members, pastors, and denominational leadership about creation and evolution. After more than 30 of these meetings, the Bethel Board of Trustees adopted a new statement on June 9, 2015, prohibiting Bethel faculty members from holding leadership positions, advocating for or having contracts with groups that do not agree with the University's corporate beliefs on human origins. In a statement about the new policy, Stump said he decided to resign and pursue alternate work rather than bringing tension to the Bethel community.

The story was covered by Inside Higher Ed, The Daily Beast, The Christian Post, and numerous independent sources.

== Books ==
- Christian Thought: A Historical Introduction (Routledge, 2010; 2nd edition 2017) co-authored with Chad V. Meister.
- The Blackwell Companion to Science and Christianity (Wiley-Blackwell, 2012), co-edited with Alan G. Padgett.
- How I Changed My Mind About Evolution (InterVarsity Press, 2016) co-edited with Kathryn Applegate.
- Science and Christianity: An Introduction to the Issues (Wiley-Blackwell, 2017).
- Old Earth or Evolutionary Creation: Discussing Origins with Reasons to Believe and BioLogos (InterVarsity Press, 2017) co-edited with Ken Keathley and Joe Aguirre.
- Four Views on Creation, Evolution, and Intelligent Design" (Zondervan, 2017). Features contributions by Ken Ham, Hugh Ross, Deborah Haarsma, and Stephen Meyer.
- Five Views on Original Sin and the Fall (InterVarsity Press, 2020), co-edited with Chad Meister. Features contributions by Hans Madueme, Oliver Crisp, Joel B. Green, Andrew Louth, and Tatha Wiley.
- The Sacred Chain: How Understanding Evolution Leads to Deeper Faith (HarperOne, 2024).
