= Praveen Sethupathy =

American geneticist

Praveen Sethupathy is an American geneticist, science author and journalist. He is a professor of physiological genomics and Chair of the Department of Biomedical Sciences at the Cornell University. He currently serves as one of the board directors at The BioLogos Foundation where he holds discussions on the relationship between science and religion.

== Education ==
Sethupathy received his BA degree from Cornell University and a PhD in genomics from the University of Pennsylvania. He completed his post-doctoral fellowship at the National Human Genome Research Institute under the direction of the then Director of National Institutes of Health Dr. Francis Collins, after which he moved to the University of North Carolina at Chapel Hill as an assistant professor in the Department of Genetics in 2011. He was selected by Genome Technology as one of the nation's top 25 rising young investigators in genomics in that same year. He was recruited to Cornell University, where he became a frequent research collaboration with Nicolas Buchon.

== Career ==
=== Science ===
Sethupathy currently leads a research lab which is focused on genome-scale and molecular approaches to understanding physiology and human disease. He researches microRNA and the broader genetic factors related to diabetes, Crohn's disease, fibrolamellar carcinoma (a rare type of liver cancer), short-term memory, diabetes, and gut epithelium.

=== Professor ===
Sethupathy returned to the Cornell University as an Associate Professor where he studied. He teaches courses on various scientific topics such as stem cells, cancer and animal physiology. He also holds courses on the relationship between science and religion (particularly concerning Christianity), evolution theory and how to reconcile it with faith.

=== Journalism ===
Sethupathy is a science journalist and the author of more than 140 peer reviewed publications in various scientific journals such as PNAS, Cell, Science, etc. He also reviews various journals and has reviewed than 50 journals. Additionally, he has received several awards. He is also a writer on science and religion and has advocated for compatibility between science and religion in his various works, frequently making publications for The BioLogos Foundation. He also advocates against various pseudoscientific topics and has made various publications debunking them.

== Personal life ==
Sethupathy is a Christian. He currently serves as a board director at The BioLogos Foundation, which is an organization that promotes harmony between science and religion. He believes in evolutionary creationism (also called theistic evolution) and considers there to be no conflicts between science and religion. He has also served on the advisory board of the Dialogue on Science, Ethics, and Religion in the American Association for the Advancement of Science (AAAS) and has also spoken in the Veritas Forum.

== See also ==
- The BioLogos Foundation
- Relationship between science and religion
- Theistic evolution
