= Deistic evolution =

Belief that evolution was set in motion by a deist god

Deistic evolution is a position in the origins debate which involves accepting the scientific evidence for evolution and age of the universe whilst advocating the view that a Deistic God created the universe but has not interfered since. The position is a counterpoint to theistic evolution and is endorsed by those who believe in Deism, and accept the scientific consensus on evolution. Various views on Deistic evolution:

In Christian Theology, by Millard J. Erickson, 2013, it is written: "deistic evolution is perhaps the best way to describe one variety of what is generally called theistic evolution." He describes it as the belief that God "began the process of evolution, producing the first matter and implanting within the creation the laws of its development has followed." Following the establishment of this process, this Creator then "withdrew from active involvement with the world, becoming, so to speak, Creator Emeritus."

God is the Creator, the ultimate cause, but evolution is the means, the proximate cause. Thus, except for its view of the very beginning of matter, deistic evolution is identical to naturalistic evolution, for it denies that there is any direct activity by a personal God during the ongoing creative process. Deistic evolution has little difficulty with the scientific data. There is a definite conflict, however, between deism's view of an absentee God and the biblical picture of a God who has been involved in a whole series of creative acts. In particular, both Genesis accounts of the origin of human beings indicate that God definitely and distinctly willed and acted to bring them into existence. In addition, deistic evolution conflicts with the scriptural doctrine of providence, according to which God is personally and intimately concerned with and involved in what is going on in the specific events within his entire creation.

The psychologist Steve Stewart-Williams, in his book Darwin, God and the Meaning of Life (2010), states:

Deistic evolutionists hold that God created the universe and the laws of nature... but that once the ball was rolling, he ceased to intervene in the day-today running of the world or in the course of natural law. God was like the ether after Einstein: he no longer had any role to play in the universe.

Stewart-Williams further writes that deistic evolution strips God of what most religious believers consider central. Any deistic God is not around for prayers, miracles, or to intervene in people's lives, and that because of this, it is unpopular with monotheistic religions.

Deistic Evolution adheres to the concept of some form of God, but denies any personal God. A recent defender of deistic evolution was Michael Anthony Corey, author of the book Back to Darwin: The Scientific Case for Deistic Evolution (1994).

Some scholars have written that Charles Darwin was an advocate of deistic evolution.

Deistic evolution is similarly the operative idea in Pandeism, which has been counted amongst the handful of spiritual beliefs which "are compatible with modern science." and specifically wherein it is noted that "pandeistic belief systems .... [present] the inclusion of God as the ever unfolding expression of a complex universe with an identifiable beginning but no teleological direction necessarily present."

== Theistic predeterminism ==
Deistic evolution is not the same as theistic evolution, yet they are sometimes confused. The difference rests on the difference between a theistic God that is interested in, if not actively involved in, the outcome of his creation and humanity specifically and a deistic god that is either disinterested in the outcome, and holds no special place for humanity, or will not intervene. Often, there is no discernible difference between the two positions—the choice of terminology has more to do with the believer and her or his need for a God, than fitting into a mostly arbitrary dictionary or academic definition.

== Criticism from Christian Creationists ==
Deistic evolution has been criticized by Christian creationists as being incompatible with Christianity since it contradicts a literal reading of the Bible, and more importantly, leaves no role for the "Christian personal God".

M. J. Erickson wrote that deistic evolution is in conflict with the scriptural doctrine of providence, according to which "God is personally and intimately concerned with and involved in what is going on in the specific events within his entire creation."

Charles P. Grannan wrote in 1894, "Another baseless assumption of negative critics is that the general principles of Atheistic and Deistic evolution, admitted by many scientists to account for the origin of the various species of plants and animals, should also be applied to explain the origin of the Christian religion."

Charles Wesley Rishell criticized the concept in 1899, comparing it to the notion (false, in his view), that gravity was a property of matter instead of a continued action of God:

If evolution is God's method of creating he is still at work. Theistic Deism and evolution is possible, but deistic evolution is a contradiction in terms. Again, it is all a mere supposition that God created the world and endowed it with forces which will of necessity work out his will. It is impossible for us to say that God put forth energy in the beginning and then ceased. It is, to say the least, as probable that gravitation is a divine force constantly exerted on matter in a certain way as that it is a divine force deposited in matter once for all.

The Roman Catholic Church disagrees with the doctrine of deistic evolution. In November 2005, Pope Benedict addressed a general audience of 25,000 in St. Peter's Square:

When the Pontiff finished his address, he put his papers to one side and commented on the thought of St. Basil the Great, a Doctor of the Church, who said that some, "deceived by the atheism they bear within them, imagined the universe deprived of a guide and order, at the mercy of chance. I believe the words of this fourth-century Father are of amazing timeliness," said Benedict XVI. "How many are these 'some' today? Deceived by atheism, they believe and try to demonstrate that it is scientific to think that everything lacks a guide and order."

== Science ==
Deistic evolution does not oppose or contradict evolution or come into conflict with science as it says that a God started the process and then left it to natural processes. However, deism is still a religious philosophy.

Stewart-Williams wrote regarding deistic evolution and science:

Deistic evolution eliminates any immediate conflict between science and belief in God. Anyone who believes that God's role was merely to create the laws of nature can accept the scientific worldview in its totality; they simply add the proviso that 'God did it' - i.e., that God is responsible for the world that science describes.

There is considerable room for this "god of the gaps" view, since scientific observation is entirely unable to shed any light on what happened during the Planck epoch, the earliest 10^{−43} seconds in the history of the universe. All development since this initial creative act merely follows laws and principles which He created:

- God created the universe, perhaps using the "big bang" about 15,000 million years ago as his method. He set up basic laws to govern the running of the universe, and then left the scene entirely. God has not been seen since. The earth coalesced about 4 or 5 thousand million years ago without any input from God. Later, elementary life forms formed, which evolved into the animals and plant life that we see today through purely natural forces. It is essentially identical to naturalistic evolution, except that it reserves one action for God: that of initially creating the matter of the universe. This belief is common among Deists.
- Although the term is rarely heard, deistic evolution is perhaps the best way to describe one variety of what is generally called theistic evolution. This is the view that God began the process of evolution, producing the first matter and implanting within the creation the laws which its development has followed. Thus, he programmed the process. Then he withdrew from active involvement with the world, becoming, so to speak, Creator emeritus. The progress of the created order is free of direct influence by God. He is the Creator of everything, but only the first living form was directly created. All the rest of God's creating has been done indirectly. God is the Creator, the ultimate cause, but evolution is the means, the proximate cause. Thus, except for its view of the very beginning of matter, deistic evolution is identical to naturalistic evolution, for it denies that there is any direct activity by a personal God during the ongoing creative process.

== See also ==
- Big Bang
- Rejection of evolution by religious groups
- Evolution and the Catholic Church
- Biological evolution
- Evolutionary Creationism
