= Deborah Haarsma =

American astrophysicist, science activist, and philosopher of religion (born 1969)

- Born: Deborah Joy Becker; June 24, 1969 (age 57); Minneapolis, Minnesota, U.S.
- Education: Bethel University; MIT
- Known for: Promotion of evolutionary creationism, criticism of anti-evolutionist creationism, advocacy of harmony between science and religion
- Scientific career
- Fields: Astrophysics
- Workplaces: Bethel University in St. Paul, Minnesota (student); Calvin College (former professor); BioLogos (former president)

Deborah Haarsma (born June 24, 1969) is an American astrophysicist, philosopher of religion and science author and activist. She is the former president of BioLogos, a Christian advocacy organization promoting evolutionary creationism and discourse on science and religion. She contributes to the intersection of modern science and Christian faith, engaging in discussions about conflicts.

== Education and academic career ==
Haarsma studied at the Bethel University in St. Paul, Minnesota where she completed her undergraduate work in physics and music. Haarsma then pursued her doctoral studies in astrophysics at the Massachusetts Institute of Technology (MIT) where she got her PhD.

Haarsma joined the faculty of Calvin University, where she served as a professor and chair of the physics and astronomy departments. In 2013, she became president of The BioLogos Foundation. She stepped down from her presidency at the end of 2024.

== Activism ==
Haarsma advocates for scientific literacy and harmony between science and religion. She has voiced support for the acceptance of the scientific consensus and what the consensus agrees with such as the age of Earth being about 4.5 billion years old, age of universe being about 13.8 billion years old, and the theory of evolution. Haarsma promotes theistic evolution.

=== COVID-19 ===
Haarsma strongly supported outbreak restrictions during the COVID-19 pandemic. She strongly promoted COVID vaccine and was involved in debunking COVID-19 misinformation. She also alongside other members of BioLogos published the statement A Christian Statement on Science for Pandemic Times which was signed by more than 2500 people including Philip Yancey, N.T. Wright, David French, and Walter Kim.

=== Theistic evolution and intelligent design ===
Haarsma has defended theistic evolutionism against both atheists and theists who argue it to be incompatible with science and theology, respectively. She sharply criticized the book Theistic Evolution: A Scientific, Philosophical, and Theological Critique published by Crossway and written by members related to the Discovery Institute. In an article on BioLogos criticizing the book, she strongly criticized the Intelligent Design movement and its goals. Haarsma stated that she "indeed" believed in something that is technically an "Intelligent Designer". However, she believed that the "designer" "designs" through the natural processes of evolution and is the first cause of it, while evolution is only secondary to the "designer". She stated that she believes that evolution occurs by natural selection (and other things included in Neo-Darwinism), but considers God's providence to be an additional factor. She believes that evolution occurs by chance and God is the one who set or determined these chances.

=== Biologos ===
During her presidency at BioLogos, Haarsma commented on the Bill Nye–Ken Ham debate, which had been criticized for giving attention to Answers in Genesis (an organization that promotes young Earth creationism) and for fueling the creation-evolution controversy. Haarsma and other members of BioLogos said "We expect that we'll agree with most of what Bill Nye will say about the science of evolution. Fossils, genetics, and other disciplines give compelling evidence that all life on earth is related and developed over a very long time through natural processes. But we're also brothers and sisters in Christ with Ken Ham. We believe that Jesus is the Son of God, that he died for our sins and rose from the dead, and that the Bible is the authoritative word of God." She, alongside others, also stated "that one of the lasting effects of this debate will be to further alienate Christianity from science in the public consciousness."

== Personal life ==
Haarsma is a Christian. She believes in theistic evolution which she prefers to call "evolutionary creationism". She believes that God interacts with and sustains the world and has rejected accusations of deism. Haarsma believes in miracles. She has rejected accusations of "philosophical naturalism", stating that she only supports "methodological naturalism".

== Selected publications ==
- Origins: A Reformed Look at Creation, Design, and Evolution. Faith Alive Christian Resources. 2007. ISBN 9781592552276.
- Origins: Christian Perspectives on Creation, Evolution, and Intelligent Design (Revised ed.). Faith Alive Christian Resources. 2011. ISBN 9781592555734.
- How I Changed My Mind About Evolution: Evangelicals Reflect on Faith and Science. IVP Academic. 2016. ISBN 9780830852901. (contributor)
- Four Views on Creation, Evolution, and Intelligent Design. HarperCollins Christian Publishing. 2017. ISBN 9780310080978. (contributor)
- Baby Dinosaurs on the Ark?: The Bible and Modern Science and the Trouble of Making It All Fit. William B. Eerdmans Publishing Company. 2021. ISBN 9780802879448. (co-author)
