= Hominization =

Academic term for the process of becoming human

Hominization, also called anthropogenesis, refers to the process of becoming human, and is used in somewhat different contexts in the fields of paleontology and paleoanthropology, archaeology, philosophy, theology, and mythography. In the latter three fields, the alternative term anthropogony has also been used. Both anthropogenesis and anthropogony sometimes instead refer to the related subject of human evolution.

== Paleontology ==
As of 2013, paleoanthropologists tend to regard the search for a precise point of hominization as somewhat irrelevant, seeing the process as gradual. Anatomically modern humans (AMH, or AMHS) developed within the species Homo sapiens about 200,000 years ago.

Many thinkers have attempted to explain hominization – from Classical times through Hobbes, Rousseau, Hegel, and Engels, who wrote an essay on The Part Played by Labour in the Transition from Ape to Man. The contemporary study of hominization in archeology often looks for signs that mark out human habitations from pre-human forms: for example, the use of grave goods.

== Philosophy and theology ==
In ancient philosophy, "hominization" referred to the ensoulment of the human fetus. When the soul is said to enter the fetus at some time later than conception, this is sometimes called "delayed hominization", as in the Aristotelian belief in ensoulment 40 days after conception.

In the context of modern theistic evolution, "hominization" refers to the theory that there was a point at which a population of hominids who had (or may have) evolved by a process of evolution acquired souls and thus (with their descendants) became fully human in theological terms. This group might be restricted to Adam and Eve, or indeed to Mitochondrial Eve, although versions of the theory allow for larger populations. The point at which this occurred should essentially be the same as in paleoanthropology and archeology, but theological discussion of the matter tends to concentrate on the theoretical. The term "special transformism" refers to theories of a divine intervention of some sort, achieving hominization.

The process and means by which hominization occurs is a key problem in theistic evolutionary thought, at least for the Abrahamic religions, for which the belief that animals do not have souls but humans do is a core teaching. Scientific accounts of the origin of the universe, origin of life, and subsequent evolution of pre-human life forms may not cause any difficulty (helped by the reluctance of science itself to say anything about what preceded the Big Bang) but the need to reconcile religious and scientific views of hominization and account for the addition of a soul to humans remains a problem. Several 19th-century theologians attempted specific solutions, including the Catholics John Augustine Zahm and St. George Jackson Mivart, but tended to come under attack from both the theological and biological camps. 20th-century thinking has tended to avoid proposing precise mechanisms.

Origin myths of humanity and of particular peoples are a frequent hominization-related subject of study within mythography, folkloristics, and comparative religion.

== See also ==
- Anthropogeny
- Evolution of human intelligence
- Evolutionary anthropology
- Evolutionary neuroscience
- Human evolution
- Dawn of Humanity – a 2015 PBS film
- List of human evolution fossils
