= The Creationists =

1993 book by Ronald Numbers

The Creationists: From Scientific Creationism to Intelligent Design
- Cover of the first edition
- Author: Ronald Numbers
- Language: English
- Subject: Creationism
- Publisher: University of California Press
- Publication date: 1993
- Publication place: United States
- Media type: Print (Hardcover and Paperback)
- Pages: 624
- ISBN: 0-520-08393-8

The Creationists: From Scientific Creationism to Intelligent Design is a history of the origins of anti-evolutionism by Ronald Numbers. First published in 1992 as The Creationists: The Evolution of Scientific Creationism, a revised and expanded edition was published under the current title in 2006.

The book has been described as "probably the most definitive history of anti-evolutionism". It has received generally favorable reviews from both the academic and the religious community.

== Synopsis ==
The expanded edition covers the history of creationism from the time of Charles Darwin to 2006. It first describes early opposition during Darwin's lifetime, then George Frederick Wright's conversion from Christian Darwinist to Fundamentalist opponent and how creationism influenced the Fundamentalist–Modernist Controversy and the rise of prominent populist creationists such as William Jennings Bryan. It then narrates the careers of two early, self-taught, 'scientific' creationists; the old Earth creationist Harry Rimmer, and the young Earth flood geologist George McCready Price.

It then chronicles the growth of creationist organisations in the mid 20th century, such as the Religion and Science Association, the Deluge Geology Society, the Evolution Protest Movement (in the United Kingdom), and the American Scientific Affiliation (ASA), the latter moving almost immediately in the direction of theistic evolution.

The book then narrates the young Earth creationist backlash against the ASA's modernism, with Henry M. Morris and John C. Whitcomb, Jr.'s publication of The Genesis Flood (1961) and the forming of the Creation Research Society, which created the creation science movement. It continues with Morris' founding of the Institute for Creation Research and the Seventh-day Adventist Church's founding of the Geoscience Research Institute.

The book then describes the influence of creationism in churches and in countries outside the United States, and the rise of the intelligent design movement, before concluding with a chapter on creationism's global impact.

Creationists mentioned in the book include George Frederick Wright, Louis Agassiz, John William Dawson, George D. Armstrong, Reverend Herbert W. Morris, Charles Hodge, Robert Lewis Dabney, Dwight L. Moody, H. L. Hastings, Luther T. Townsend, Alexander Patterson, Robert Patterson, Eleazar Lord, David Lord, James Dwight Dana.

== Reception ==
In the ecumenical journal First Things, historian of Christianity Mark A. Noll describes its 1992 edition as a "thorough, patient, even-handed, and exhaustively researched" chronicle of twentieth century creationism.

Former archbishop of York John Habgood described the expanded edition, in an article in The Times, as a "massively well-documented history" that "must surely be the definitive study of the rise and growth of a cluster of well-meaning, but irrational, theories over a period of some 160 years."

== Editions ==
- 1992 - New York: Knopf (as The Creationists: The Evolution of Scientific Creationism)
- 1993 - paperback edition, University of California Press
- 2006 - expanded edition, Cambridge, MA: Harvard University Press (newly subtitled: The Creationists: From Scientific Creationism to Intelligent Design), ISBN 0-674-02339-0

== Notable reviews ==
Original edition

- Stephen R. L. Clark, New York Times Book Review, Jan. 10, 1993
- James A. Mathisen, "Review, The Creationists and When Time Shall Be No More", Sociology of Religion, v.55, n.1, "Religious Experience" (Spring 1994), pp. 94–97.
- James A. Gavan, Review, American Journal of Physical Anthropology, v.91, n.1, pp. 135–136 (June 7, 2005) doi:10.1002/ajpa.1330910112
