= The Blackwell Companion to Science and Christianity =

2012 reference work

- Author: J.B. Stump; Alan G. Padgett
- Language: English
- Genre: Reference
- Publisher: Wiley-Blackwell
- Publication date: 2012
- Publication place: United States of America
- Media type: Print (hardcover)
- Pages: 644
- ISBN: 978-1-4443-3571-2

The Blackwell Companion to Science and Christianity is a reference work in science and religion, edited by James B. Stump and Alan G. Padgett, and published by Wiley-Blackwell in 2012. It contains 54 new essays written by an international list of 55 authors, many of them leading scholars in the discipline of science and religion, and others new or up-and-coming voices in the field.

The editors state, "We are seeking to introduce and advance serious thinking and talking about science and Christianity, particularly as they interconnect. We are reflecting on the work of scientists and theologians, trying to find points of contact and points of tension which help to illuminate these practices and doctrines in clear, scholarly light."

The book has received positive reviews in Choice, Reference Reviews, Themelios and Perspectives on Science and Christian Faith. The article by Sean M. Carroll generated significant attention when it was discussed on the Huffington Post.

== Contents ==
Part I - Historical Episodes

1. Early Christian Belief in Creation and the Beliefs Sustaining the Modern Scientific Endeavor, by Christopher B. Kaiser
2. The Copernican Revolution and the Galileo Affair, by Maurice A. Finocchiaro
3. Women, Mechanical Science, and God in the Early Modern Period, by Jacqueline Broad
4. Christian Responses to Darwinism in the Late Nineteenth Century, by Peter J. Bowler
5. Science Falsely so Called: Fundamentalism and Science, by Edward B. Davis

Part II - Methodology

6. How to Relate Science and Christian Faith, by Mikael Stenmark
7. Authority, by Nicholas Rescher
8. Feminist Philosophies of Science: Towards a Prophetic Epistemology, by Lisa L. Stenmark
9. Practical Objectivity: Keeping Natural Science Natural, Alan G. Padgett
10. The Evolutionary Argument against Naturalism, by Alvin Plantinga

Part III - Natural Theology

11. Arguments to God from the Observable Universe, by Richard Swinburne
12. 'God of the Gaps' Arguments, by Gregory E. Ganssle
13. Natural Theology after Modernism, by J.B. Stump
14. Religious Epistemology Personified: God without Natural Theology, by Paul K. Moser
15. Problems for Christian Natural Theology, by Alexander R. Pruss and Richard M. Gale

Part IV - Cosmology and Physics

16. Modern Cosmology and Christian Theology, by Stephen M. Barr
17. Does the Universe Need God? by Sean Carroll
18. Does God Love the Multiverse? by Don N. Page
19. The Fine-Tuning of the Cosmos: A Fresh Look at Its Implications, by Robin Collins
20. Quantum Theory and Theology, by Rodney D. Holder

Part V - Evolution

21. Creation and Evolution, by Denis R. Alexander
22. Darwinism and Atheism: A Marriage Made in Heaven? by Michael Ruse
23. Creation and Evolutionary Convergence, by Simon Conway Morris
24. Signature in the Cell: Intelligent Design and the DNA Enigma, by Stephen C. Meyer
25. Darwin and Intelligent Design, by Francisco J. Ayala
26. Christianity and Human Evolution, by John F. Haught
27. Christian Theism and Life on Earth, by Paul Draper

Part VI - The Human Sciences

28. Toward a Cognitive Science of Christianity, by Justin L. Barrett
29. The Third Wound: Has Psychology Banished the Ghost from the Machine? by Dylan Evans
30. Sociology and Christianity, by John H. Evans and Michael S. Evans
31. Economics and Christian Faith, by Robin J. Klay

Part VII - Christian Bioethics

32. Shaping Human Life at the Molecular Level, by James C. Peterson
33. An Inclusive Framework for Stem Cell Research, by John F. Kilner
34. The Problem of Transhumanism in the Light of Philosophy and Theology, by Philippe Gagnon
35. Ecology and the Environment, Lisa H. Sideris

Part VIII - Metaphysical Implications

36. Free Will and Rational Choice, by E.J. Lowe
37. Science, Religion, and Infinity, by Graham Oppy
38. God and Abstract Objects, by William Lane Craig
39. Laws of Nature, by Lydia Jaeger

Part IX - The Mind

40. Christianity, Neuroscience, and Dualism, by J.P. Moreland
41. The Emergence of Persons, by William Hasker
42. Christianity and the Extended-Mind Thesis, by Lynne Rudder Baker
43. In Whose Image? Artificial Intelligence and the Imago Dei, by Noreen Herzfeld
44. How Science Lost Its Soul, and Religion Handed It Back, by Julian Baggini

Part X - Theology

45. The Trinity and Scientific Reality, by John Polkinghorne
46. God and Miracle in an Age of Science, by Alan G. Padgett
47. Eschatology in Science and Theology, by Robert John Russell
48. The Quest for Transcendence in Theology and Cosmology, by Alexei V. Nesteruk

Part XI - Significant Figures of the Twentieth Century in Science and Christianity

49. Pierre Teilhard de Chardin, by James F. Salmon
50. Thomas F. Torrance, by Tapio Luoma
51. Arthur Peacocke, by Taede A. Smedes
52. Ian G. Barbour, by Nathan J. Hallanger
53. Wolfhart Pannenberg, by Hans Schwarz
54. John Polkinghorne, by Christopher C. Knight
