= The Language of God =

2006 book by Francis Collins

- Cover
- Author: Francis Collins
- Illustrator: Michael Hagelberg
- Language: English
- Subject: Christianity and science, apologetics
- Genre: Religious studies
- Publisher: Free Press
- Publication date: 2006
- Publication place: United States
- Pages: 304
- ISBN: 0-7432-8639-1
- OCLC: 65978711
- Dewey Decimal: 215 22
- LC Class: BL240.3 .C66 2006

The Language of God: A Scientist Presents Evidence for Belief is a 2006 book by Francis Collins in which he advocates theistic evolution and describes his conversion to Christianity. Collins is an American physician-geneticist, noted for his discoveries of disease genes, and his leadership of the Human Genome Project (HGP). He served as the director of the US National Institutes of Health from August 17, 2009, to December 19, 2021.

Collins raises arguments for the existence of God, drawing from science and philosophy. He cites many famous thinkers, most prevalently C. S. Lewis, as well as Augustine of Hippo, Stephen Hawking, Charles Darwin, Theodosius Dobzhansky and others. The book was selected for the 2007 Christianity Today Book Awards.

== Synopsis ==
=== Conversion to Christianity ===
Collins's conversion to Christianity is detailed at the beginning and end of The Language of God. He grew up in an agnostic family, and knew at an early age that he wanted to be a scientist. At first, he was interested in the physical sciences, since "biology was rather like existential philosophy: it just didn't make sense" (page 181). However, nearing the end of his Ph.D. program, Collins took a biochemistry course and became interested in the field. He entered medical school and began genetic research and a clinical practice after graduating. In one instance, Collins was asked by a Christian patient about his spiritual beliefs. He did not really have an answer; Collins then decided that he should confirm his atheism by studying the best arguments for faith. A pastor directed him to Mere Christianity by C. S. Lewis, which he cites as the main cause of his conversion.

=== Moral Law ===
Another section of The Language of God focuses on the argument from morality. Moral Law is very important to Collins: "After twenty-eight years as a believer, the Moral Law stands out for me as the strongest signpost of God" (p. 218). Moral Law is an argument for the existence of God; Collins quotes C. S. Lewis to describe it: "The denunciation of oppression, murder, treachery, falsehood and the injunction of kindness to the aged, the young, and the weak, almsgiving, impartiality, and honesty." Collins argues that all cultures and religions of the world endorse a universal, absolute and timeless Moral Law, which is documented in the Encyclopedia of Religion and Ethics as a unique property that separates humans from animals. The Moral Law includes altruism, which is more than just reciprocity ("You scratch my back, and I'll scratch yours"). His second argument is: "Selfless altruism presents a major challenge for the evolutionist" (p. 27).

=== Intersection of science and faith ===
Collins argues that science and faith can be compatible. In an interview on the Point of Inquiry podcast, he told D. J. Grothe that "the scientific method and the scientific worldview can't be allowed to get distorted by religious perspectives", but that he does not think "being a believer or a non-believer affects one's ability to do science." He also said that "the faith that [Richard] Dawkins describes in The God Delusion isn't the faith I recognize," and that, like him, "most people are seeking a possible harmony between these worldviews [faith and science]."

=== BioLogos ===
The book proposes the name "BioLogos" as a new term for theistic evolution. Bios is the Greek word for "life." Logos is Greek for "word", with a broader meaning in Heracleitean philosophy and Stoicism—namely, the rational principle ordering the universe. This concept was appropriated by Christian theology, where "Word" is an ordering principle as well as a creative agent for all that exists. Furthermore, in some Christian thinking, the eternal and divine Logos merged and synthesized with a human nature to become Jesus Christ in the Incarnation. This is laid out in the opening prologue of the Gospel of John, forming part of the textual basis for Christian belief in the Trinity, as the concept of Logos morphed over time into God the Son for the second person of the Trinity.

"BioLogos" expresses the belief that God is the source of all life and that life expresses the will of God. BioLogos represents the view that science and faith co-exist in harmony.

However, this did not become the most widely used definition of that name. Instead, BioLogos became the name of the science and faith organization Collins founded in November 2007. The organization BioLogos now prefers the term "evolutionary creation" to describe its position regarding evolution and Genesis.

== Reception ==
Publishers Weekly writes: "This marvelous book combines a personal account of Collins's faith and experiences as a genetics researcher with discussions of more general topics of science and spirituality, especially centering around evolution."

Writing for eSkeptic (the digital newsletter of the American Skeptic magazine), Robert K. Eberle summarizes his opinion of the book: "The Language of God is well written, and in many places quite thoughtful, but unless one is predisposed to the idea of theistic evolution, most will probably find the book unconvincing on this front."

New Atheist Sam Harris stated reading the book was like witnessing an "intellectual suicide". Harris sees Collins's "waterfall experience" (three frozen streams reminding him of the Trinity) as no more valid than would be a reminder to him (Harris) of the three mythical founders of Rome; he argues that Collins's treatment of the evolution of altruism should have considered kin selection and exaptation, and challenges Collins's theodicy by claiming that rationalists should ask whether evidence suggests the existence of an omnipotent, omniscient, omnibenevolent God, rather than whether the evidence is compatible with it.

In contrast to Harris' criticisms, physicist Stephen M. Barr writes for First Things that Collins' book is meant to be "the story of how and why he came to believe in God... There are many conversion stories and many scientific autobiographies, but few books in which prominent scientists tell how they came to faith." Barr concludes that while "so many people on both sides are trying to foment a conflict between science and religion, Collins is a sorely needed voice of reason. His book may do more to promote better understanding between the worlds of faith and science than any other so far written."
