= George Frederick Wright =

American geologist (1838–1921)

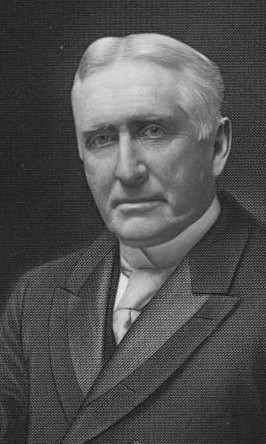
George Frederick Wright

George Frederick Wright (January 22, 1838 – April 20, 1921) was an American geologist and a professor at Oberlin Theological Seminary, first of New Testament language and literature (1881 – 1892), and then of "harmony of science and revelation" (until retirement in 1907). He wrote prolifically, publishing works in geology, history, and theology. Early in his career he was an outspoken defender of Darwinism, and later in life he emphasised his commitment to a form of theistic evolution.

== Early life and education ==
G. F. Wright was born in Whitehall, New York. He graduated from Oberlin College in 1859 and received an M.A. from Oberlin Theological Seminary in 1862. In 1887 he obtained a D.D. from Brown University and an LL.D. from Drury College. He was made a Fellow of the Geological Society of America in 1890.

== Career ==
=== Army service ===
In 1861, during the Civil War, he served in the Union army for 5 months.

=== Pastoral career ===
He pastored Congregational churches in Bakersfield, Vermont (1861 – 1872) and Andover, Massachusetts (1872 – 1881). He then accepted a professorship of New Testament language and literature at Oberlin Theological Seminary. In 1892 he took a newly created professorship in "harmony of science and revelation". In 1907 he was made professor emeritus and retired on a Carnegie Pension. He also frequently lectured at the Lowell Institute.

He was assistant geologist with the Pennsylvania Geological Survey in 1881 and 1882, and with the USGS from 1884 to 1892. He was president of the Ohio Historical Society from 1907 until shortly before he died. His geology interests took him all over the world — Alaska, Greenland, China, Mongolia, Manchuria, Siberia, Turkestan, and the Caucasus and Lebanon mountains — gathering original information for the books he published.

In 1900 he travelled with his son Fred Wright to Egypt where he met Moses B. Cotsworth and Mrs Mabel Bent. They travelled together until an unfortunate incident in which Mabel's horse rolled on her and broke her leg. Wright and Cotsworth remained friends and often corresponded about geology; particularly ice ages and glaciers. Wright helped Cotsworth to formulate his theory of the perpetual movement of continents.

== Views on evolution ==
Early in life, Wright arose as a leader of the Christian Darwinists. During his time pastoring in Andover, Wright developed a friendship with Christian Darwinist Asa Gray, and encouraged him to publish more openly on his views harmonizing their common evangelical Calvinist faith with the new biology and geology. He also helped edit Gray's collection of essays, Darwiniana. Wright apparently believed that humanity might still be an act of special creation, but he otherwise taught that the biblical creation stories were meant to teach theological truths, and thus should not be expected to reveal scientific knowledge.

However, after a crisis of faith in the 1890s brought on by Charles Augustus Briggs' higher criticism, he readjusted his views on origins to line up more closely with a literalist reading of the biblical creation stories. In his later writings, including the chapter he wrote for The Fundamentals, he accepted geologic time, but argued that human origins required divine intervention, and that biological variation extending to form new species would be evidence of design. He stated "By no stretch of legitimate reasoning can Darwinism be made to exclude design. Indeed, if it should be proved that species have developed from others of a lower order, as varieties are supposed to have done, it would strengthen rather than weaken the standard argument from design." That is, he subscribed to theistic evolution.

== Bibliography ==
- Logic of Christian Evidences (Andover, 1880)
- Introduction to Historical Sketches of Andover, Massachusetts (Andover, 1880)
- Studies in Science and Religion (1882)
- An Inquiry concerning the Relation of Death to Probation (Boston, 1882)
- The Divine Authority of the Bible (1884)
- The Glacial Boundary in Ohio, Indiana, and Kentucky (Cleveland, 0., 1884)
- The Ice Age in North America, and its Bearings upon the Antiquity of Man (New York, 1889; 5th ed., 1911)
- Charles Grandison Finney (Boston, 1891) online version
- Man and the Glacial Period (New York, 1892)
- Greenland Icefields and Life in the North Atlantic (1896)
- Scientific Aspects of Christian Evidences (1898)
- Asiatic Russia' (1902)
- Scientific Confirmations of Old Testament History (Oberlin, 0., 1907)
- Early Man: How to Promote Peace in a Family
- Origin and Antiquity of Man (1912)
- "The Mosaic Authorship Of The Pentateuch", in The Fundamentals: A Testimony to the Truth, Chapter 2.
- "The Testimony of the Monuments to the Truth of the Scriptures, in The Fundamentals: A Testimony to the Truth, Chapter 16.
- "The Passing of Evolution", In The Fundamentals: A Testimony to Truth, Chapter 69.
- Many articles in Bibliotheca Sacra

Edited:

- Bibliotheca Sacra (1884 – c. 1920)
- Records of the Past (1905 – c. 1920)
