= Biological Evolution: Facts and Theories =

Conference

Biological Evolution: Facts and Theories was a five-day conference held in March 2009 by the Pontifical Gregorian University in Rome, marking the 150th anniversary of the publication of the Origin of Species. The conference was sponsored by the Catholic Church.
