= Theistic evolution =

View that combines evolutionary science with theism

Theistic evolution (also known as theistic evolutionism or God-guided evolution, or alternatively called evolutionary creationism) is a view that God acts and creates through laws of nature. Here, God is taken as the primary cause while natural causes are secondary, positing that the concept of God and religious beliefs are compatible with the findings of modern science, including evolution. Theistic evolution is not in itself a scientific theory, but includes a range of views about how science relates to religious beliefs and the extent to which God intervenes. It rejects the strict creationist doctrines of special creation but can include beliefs such as creation of the human soul. Modern theistic evolution accepts the general scientific consensus on the age of the Earth, the age of the universe, the Big Bang, the origin of the Solar System, the origin of life, and evolution.

Supporters of theistic evolution generally attempt to harmonize evolutionary thought with belief in God and reject the conflict between religion and science; they hold that religious beliefs and scientific theories do not need to contradict each other. Diversity exists regarding how the two concepts of faith and science fit together.

== Definition ==
Francis Collins describes theistic evolution as the position that "evolution is real, but that it was set in motion by God", and characterizes it as accepting "that evolution occurred as biologists describe it, but under the direction of God". He lists six general premises on which different versions of theistic evolution typically rest. They include:

1. The prevailing cosmological model, with the universe coming into being about 13.8 billion years ago;
2. The fine-tuned universe;
3. Evolution and natural selection;
4. No special supernatural intervention is involved once evolution got under way;
5. Humans are a result of these evolutionary processes; and
6. Despite all these, humans are unique. The concern for the Moral Law (the knowledge of right and wrong) and the continuous search for God among all human cultures defy evolutionary explanations and point to our spiritual nature.

The executive director of the National Center for Science Education in the United States of America, Eugenie Scott, has used the term to refer to the part of the overall spectrum of beliefs about creation and evolution holding the theological view that God creates through evolution. It covers a wide range of beliefs about the extent of any intervention by God, with some approaching deism in rejecting the concepts of continued intervention or special creation, while others believe that God has directly intervened at crucial points such as the origin of humans.

In the Catholic version of theistic evolution, human evolution may have occurred, but God must create the human soul, and the creation story in the book of Genesis should be read metaphorically.

Some Muslims believe that only humans were exceptions to common ancestry (human exceptionalism), while some give an allegorical reading of Adam's creation (Non-exceptionalism). Some Muslims believe that only Adam and Hawa (Eve) were special creations and they alongside their earliest descendants were exceptions to common ancestry, but the later descendants (including modern humans) share common ancestry with the rest of life on Earth because there were human-like beings on Earth before Adam's arrival who came through evolution. This belief is known as "Adamic exceptionalism".

When evolutionary science developed, so did different types of theistic evolution. Creationists Henry M. Morris and John D. Morris have listed different terms which were used to describe different positions from the 1890s to the 1920s: "Orthogenesis" (goal-directed evolution), "nomogenesis" (evolution according to fixed law), "emergent evolution", "creative evolution", and others.

The Jesuit paleontologist Pierre Teilhard de Chardin (1881–1955) was an influential proponent of God-directed evolution or "orthogenesis", in which man will eventually evolve to the "omega point" of union with the Creator.

=== Alternative terms ===
Others see "evolutionary creation" (EC, also referred to by some observers as "evolutionary creationism") as the belief that God, as Creator, uses evolution to bring about his plan. Eugenie Scott states in Evolution Vs. Creationism that it is a type of evolution rather than creationism, despite its name. "From a scientific point of view, evolutionary creationism is hardly distinguishable from Theistic Evolution ... [the differences] lie not in science but in theology." Those who hold to evolutionary creationism argue that God is involved to a greater extent than the theistic evolutionist believes.

Canadian biologist Denis Lamoureux published a 2003 article and a 2008 theological book, both aimed at Christians who do not believe in evolution (including young Earth creationists), and at those looking to reconcile their Christian faith with evolutionary science. His main argument was that Genesis presents the "science and history of the day" as "incidental vessels" to convey spiritual truths. Lamoureux rewrote his article as a 2009 journal paper, incorporating excerpts from his books, in which he noted the similarities of his views to theistic evolution, but objected to that term as making evolution the focus rather than creation. He also distanced his beliefs from the deistic or more liberal beliefs included in theistic evolution. He also argued that although referring to the same view, the word arrangement in the term "theistic evolution" places "the process of evolution as the primary term, and makes the Creator secondary as merely a qualifying adjective".

Divine intervention is seen at critical intervals in history in a way consistent with scientific explanations of speciation, with similarities to the ideas of progressive creationism that God created "kinds" of animals sequentially.

Regarding the embracing of Darwinian evolution, historian Ronald Numbers describes the position of the late 19th-century geologist George Frederick Wright as "Christian Darwinism".

Jacob Klapwijk and Howard J. Van Till have, while accepting both theistic creation and evolution, rejected the term "theistic evolution".

In 2006, American geneticist and Director of the National Institute of Health, Francis Collins, published The Language of God. He stated that faith and science are compatible and suggested the word "BioLogos" (Word of Life) to describe theistic evolution. Collins later laid out the idea that God created all things, but that evolution is the best scientific explanation for the diversity of all life on Earth. The name BioLogos instead became the name of the organization Collins founded years later. This organization now prefers the term "evolutionary creation" to describe their take on theistic evolution.

== Historical development ==
Historians of science (and authors of pre-evolutionary ideas) have pointed out that scientists had considered the concept of biological change well before Darwin.

In the 17th century, the English Nonconformist/Anglican priest and botanist John Ray, in his book The Wisdom of God Manifested in the Works of Creation (1692), had wondered "why such different species should not only mingle together, but also generate an animal, and yet that that hybridous production should not again generate, and so a new race be carried on".

18th-century scientist Carl Linnaeus (1707–1778) published Systema Naturae (1735), a book in which he considered that new varieties of plants could arise through hybridization, but only under certain limits fixed by God. Linnaeus had initially embraced the Aristotelian idea of immutability of species (the idea that species never change), but later in his life he started to challenge it. Yet, as a Christian, he still defended "special creation", the belief that God created "every living creature" at the beginning, as read in Genesis, with the peculiarity a set of original species of which all the present species have descended.

Linnaeus wrote:

Let us suppose that the Divine Being in the beginning progressed from the simpler to the complex; from few to many; similarly that He in the beginning of the plant kingdom created as many plants as there were natural orders. These plant orders He Himself, there from producing, mixed among themselves until from them originated those plants which today exist as genera. Nature then mixed up these plant genera among themselves through generations -of double origin (hybrids) and multiplied them into existing species, as many as possible (whereby the flower structures were not changed) excluding from the number of species the almost sterile hybrids, which are produced by the same mode of origin.

— Systema Vegetabilium (1774)

Linnaeus attributed the active process of biological change to God himself, as he stated:

We imagine that the Creator at the actual time of creation made only one single species for each natural order of plants, this species being different in habit and fructification from all the rest. That he made these mutually fertile, whence out of their progeny, fructification having been somewhat changed, Genera of natural classes have arisen as many in number as the different parents, and since this is not carried further, we regard this also as having been done by His Omnipotent hand directly in the beginning; thus all Genera were primeval and constituted a single Species. That as many Genera having arisen as there were individuals in the beginning, these plants in course of time became fertilised by others of different sort and thus arose Species until so many were produced as now exist ... these Species were sometimes fertilised out of congeners, that is other Species of the same Genus, whence have arisen Varieties.

— From his Fundamenta fructificationis (1742)

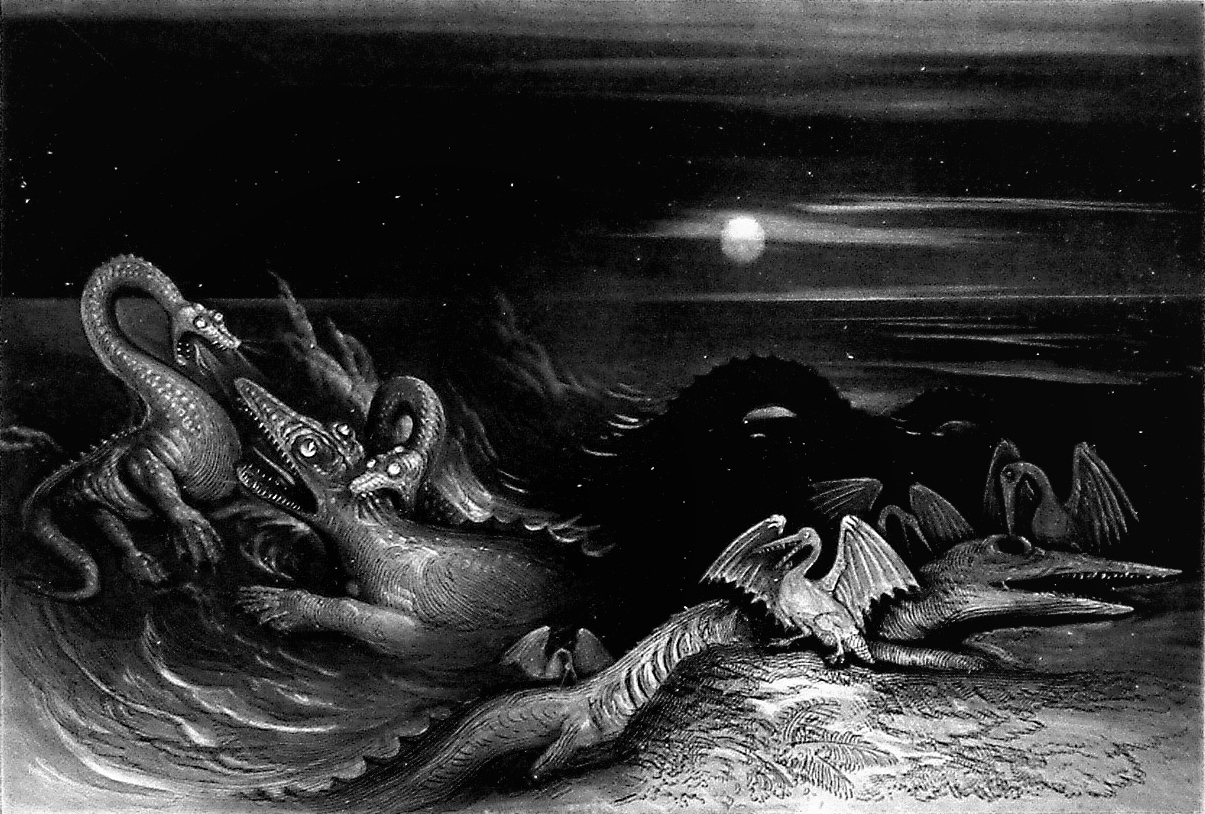
In the 19th century, geology and paleontology were still connected to Old Earth creationism. The above depicts a brutal world of deep time, existing before Adam and Eve, from Thomas Hawkins' book on plesiosaurs. Artist: John Martin, 1840

Jens Christian Clausen (1967), refers to Linnaeus' theory as a "forgotten evolutionary theory [that] antedates Darwin's by nearly 100 years", and reports that he was a pioneer in doing experiments about hybridization.

Later observations by Protestant botanists Carl Friedrich von Gärtner (1772–1850) and Joseph Gottlieb Kölreuter (1733–1806) denied the immutability of species, which the Bible never teaches. Kölreuter used the term "transmutation of species" to refer to species which have experienced biological changes through hybridization, although they both were inclined to believe that hybrids would revert to the parental forms by a general law of reversion, and therefore, would not be responsible for the introduction of new species. Later, in a number of experiments carried out between 1856 and 1863, the Augustinian friar Gregor Mendel (1822–1884), aligning himself with the "new doctrine of special creation" proposed by Linnaeus, concluded that new species of plants could indeed arise, although limitedly and retaining their own stability.

Georges Cuvier's analysis of fossils and discovery of extinction disrupted static views of nature in the early 19th century, confirming geology as showing a historical sequence of life. British natural theology, which sought examples of adaptation to show design by a benevolent Creator, adopted catastrophism to show earlier organisms being replaced in a series of creations by new organisms better adapted to a changed environment. Charles Lyell (1797–1875) also saw adaptation to changing environments as a sign of a benevolent Creator, but his uniformitarianism envisaged continuing extinctions, leaving unanswered the problem of providing replacements. As seen in correspondence between Lyell and John Herschel, scientists were looking for creation by laws rather than by miraculous interventions. In continental Europe, the idealism of philosophers including Lorenz Oken (1779–1851) developed a Naturphilosophie in which patterns of development from archetypes were a purposeful divine plan aimed at forming humanity. These scientists rejected transmutation of species as materialist radicalism threatening the established hierarchies of society. The idealist Louis Agassiz (1807–1873), a persistent opponent of transmutation, saw mankind as the goal of a sequence of creations, but his concepts were the first to be adapted into a scheme of theistic evolutionism, when in Vestiges of the Natural History of Creation published in 1844, its anonymous author (Robert Chambers) set out goal-centred progressive development as the Creator's divine plan, programmed to unfold without direct intervention or miracles. The book became a best-seller and popularised the idea of transmutation in a designed "law of progression". The scientific establishment strongly attacked Vestiges at the time, but later more sophisticated theistic evolutionists followed the same approach of looking for patterns of development as evidence of design.

The comparative anatomist Richard Owen (1804–1892), a prominent figure in the Victorian era scientific establishment, opposed transmutation throughout his life. When formulating homology he adapted idealist philosophy to reconcile natural theology with development, unifying nature as divergence from an underlying form in a process demonstrating design. His conclusion to his On the Nature of Limbs of 1849 suggested that divine laws could have controlled the development of life, but he did not expand this idea after objections from his conservative patrons. Others supported the idea of development by law, including the botanist Hewett Watson (1804–1881) and the Reverend Baden Powell (1796–1860), who wrote in 1855 that such laws better illustrated the powers of the Creator. In 1858 Owen in his speech as President of the British Association said that in "continuous operation of Creative power" through geological time, new species of animals appeared in a "successive and continuous fashion" through birth from their antecedents by a Creative law rather than through slow transmutation.

=== On the Origin of Species ===
When Charles Darwin published On the Origin of Species in 1859, many liberal Christians accepted evolution provided they could reconcile it with divine design. The clergymen Charles Kingsley (1819–1875) and Frederick Temple (1821–1902), both conservative Christians in the Church of England, promoted a theology of creation as an indirect process controlled by divine laws. Some strict Calvinists welcomed the idea of natural selection, as it did not entail inevitable progress and humanity could be seen as a fallen race requiring salvation. The Anglo-Catholic Aubrey Moore (1848–1890) also accepted the theory of natural selection, incorporating it into his Christian beliefs as merely the way God worked. Darwin's friend Asa Gray (1810–1888) defended natural selection as compatible with design.

Darwin himself, in his second edition of the Origin (January 1860), had written in the conclusion:

I believe that animals have descended from at most only four or five progenitors, and plants from an equal or lesser number. Analogy would lead me one step further, namely, to the belief that all animals and plants have descended from some one prototype. But analogy may be a deceitful guide. Nevertheless all living things have much in common, in their chemical composition, their germinal vesicles, their cellular structure, and their laws of growth and reproduction. We see this even in so trifling a circumstance as that the same poison often similarly affects plants and animals; or that the poison secreted by the gall-fly produces monstrous growths on the wild rose or oak-tree. I should infer from analogy that probably all the organic beings which have ever lived on this earth have descended from some one primordial form, into which life was first breathed by the Creator.

— Chapter XIV: "Conclusions", page 428.

Within a decade most scientists had started espousing evolution, but from the outset some expressed opposition to the concept of natural selection and searched for a more purposeful mechanism. In 1860 Richard Owen attacked Darwin's Origin of Species in an anonymous review while praising "Professor Owen" for "the establishment of the axiom of the continuous operation of the ordained becoming of living things". In December 1859 Darwin had been disappointed to hear that Sir John Herschel apparently dismissed the book as "the law of higgledy-pigglety", and in 1861 Herschel wrote of evolution that "[a]n intelligence, guided by a purpose, must be continually in action to bias the direction of the steps of change—to regulate their amount—to limit their divergence—and to continue them in a definite course". He added "On the other hand, we do not mean to deny that such intelligence may act according to law (that is to say, on a preconceived and definite plan)". The scientist Sir David Brewster (1781–1868), a member of the Free Church of Scotland, wrote an article called "The Facts and Fancies of Mr. Darwin" (1862) in which he rejected many Darwinian ideas, such as those concerning vestigial organs or questioning God's perfection in his work. Brewster concluded that Darwin's book contained both "much valuable knowledge and much wild speculation", although accepting that "every part of the human frame had been fashioned by the Divine hand and exhibited the most marvellous and beneficent adaptions for the use of men".

In the 1860s theistic evolutionism became a popular compromise in science and gained widespread support from the general public. Between 1866 and 1868 Owen published a theory of derivation, proposing that species had an innate tendency to change in ways that resulted in variety and beauty showing creative purpose. Both Owen and Mivart (1827–1900) insisted that natural selection could not explain patterns and variation, which they saw as resulting from divine purpose. In 1867 the Duke of Argyll published The Reign of Law, which explained beauty in plumage without any adaptive benefit as design generated by the Creator's laws of nature for the delight of humans. Argyll attempted to reconcile evolution with design by suggesting that the laws of variation prepared rudimentary organs for a future need.

Cardinal John Henry Newman wrote in 1868: "Mr Darwin's theory need not then to be atheistical, be it true or not; it may simply be suggesting a larger idea of Divine Prescience and Skill ... and I do not [see] that 'the accidental evolution of organic beings' is inconsistent with divine design—It is accidental to us, not to God."

In 1871 Darwin published his own research on human ancestry in The Descent of Man, concluding that humans "descended from a hairy quadruped, furnished with a tail and pointed ears", which would be classified amongst the Quadrumana along with monkeys, and in turn descended "through a long line of diversified forms" going back to something like the larvae of sea squirts. Critics promptly complained that this "degrading" image "tears the crown from our heads", but there is little evidence that it led to loss of faith. Among the few who did record the impact of Darwin's writings, the naturalist Joseph LeConte struggled with "distress and doubt" following the death of his daughter in 1861, before enthusiastically saying in the late 1870s there was "not a single philosophical question connected with our highest and dearest religious and spiritual interests that is fundamentally affected, or even put in any new light, by the theory of evolution", and in the late 1880s embracing the view that "evolution is entirely consistent with a rational theism". Similarly, George Frederick Wright (1838–1921) responded to Darwin's Origin of Species and Charles Lyell's 1863 Geological Evidences of the Antiquity of Man by turning to Asa Gray's belief that God had set the rules at the start and only intervened on rare occasions, as a way to harmonise evolution with theology. The idea of evolution did not seriously shake Wright's faith, but he later suffered a crisis when confronted with historical criticism of the Bible.

== Acceptance ==
According to Eugenie Scott: "In one form or another, Theistic Evolutionism is the view of creation taught at the majority of mainline Protestant seminaries, and despite the Catholic Church having no official position, it does support belief in it. Studies show that acceptance of evolution is lower in the United States than in Europe or Japan; among 34 countries sampled, only Turkey had a lower rate of acceptance than the United States.

Theistic evolution has been described as arguing for compatibility between science and religion, and as such it is viewed with disdain both by some atheists and many young Earth creationists.

== Hominization ==
Hominization, in both science and religion, involves the process or the purpose of becoming human. The process and means by which hominization occurs is a key problem in theistic evolutionary thought. This is noticeable more so in Abrahamic religions, which often have held as a core belief that the souls of animals and humans differ in some capacity. Thomas Aquinas taught animals did not have immortal souls, but that humans did. Many versions of theistic evolution insist on a special creation consisting of at least the addition of a soul just for the human species.

Scientific accounts of the origin of the universe, the origin of life, and subsequent evolution of pre-human life forms may not cause any difficulty but the need to reconcile religious and scientific views of hominization and to account for the addition of a soul to humans remains a problem. Theistic evolution typically postulates a point at which a population of hominids who had (or may have) evolved by a process of natural evolution acquired souls and thus (with their descendants) became fully human in theological terms. This group might be restricted to Adam and Eve, or indeed to Mitochondrial Eve, although versions of the theory allow for larger populations. The point at which such an event occurred should essentially be the same as in paleoanthropology and archeology, but theological discussion of the matter tends to concentrate on the theoretical. The term "special transformism" is sometimes used to refer to theories that there was a divine intervention of some sort, achieving hominization.

Several 19th-century theologians and evolutionists attempted specific solutions, including the Catholics John Augustine Zahm and St. George Jackson Mivart, but tended to come under attack from both the theological and biological camps. and 20th-century thinking tended to avoid proposing precise mechanisms.

== Islamic views ==
=== Theological views and stances ===
The Islamic scholar, science lecturer and theologian Shoaib Ahmed Malik divides Muslim positions on the evolution theory into four different views.

1. Non-evolutionism: The rejection of evolutionary theory and all of its elements, including common ancestry, macro-evolution, etc. many of its proponents, however, still accept micro-evolution.
2. Human exceptionalism: The acceptance of the entirety of evolutionary theory except for human evolution. More specifically, it rejects the idea that modern humans share common ancestry with other life-forms on Earth. It may still accept that humans evolved over time after Adam's creation and that various species of humans evolved over time.
3. Adamic exceptionalism: The acceptance of evolution, only making an exception for Adam and Hawa (Eve). It asserts that Adam was the first theologically accurate human. However, taxonomically accurate humans or human-like beings already existed on Earth before their arrival. Thus, it accepts the belief that modern humans share common ancestry with other life-forms on Earth, and that our lineage can be traced back to the origin of life.
4. Non-exceptionalism: The acceptance of evolution without any exceptions for miraculous creation.

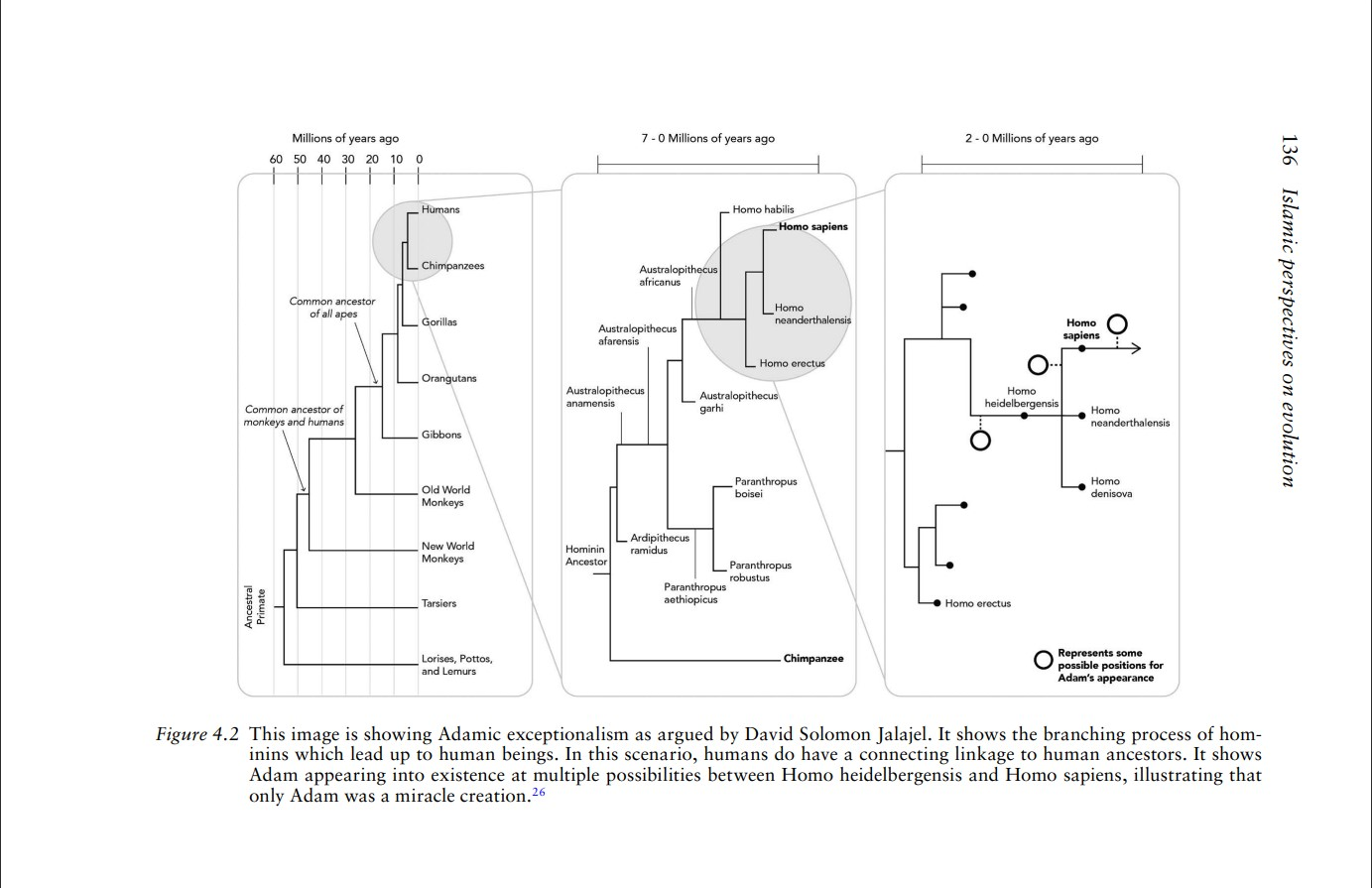
Diagram of Adamic exceptionalism

Adamic exceptionalism is the current leading view, as it is considered to be compatible with both science and Islamic theology. Adamic exceptionalism asserts that Adam and Eve were created by Allah through miracles as the first humans, and that the rest of humanity descends from them. At the same time, this view asserts that modern humans emerged through evolution and that modern humans have a lineage leading up to the origin of life (FUCA), and that evolution occurred just as theorized (e.g. Austalopithecus afarensis to Homo habilis, H. habilis to H. ergaster, H. ergaster to H. heidelbergensis, H. heidelbergensis to H. sapiens, etc.) Adamic exceptionalists believe that Allah created human-like beings on Earth through evolution before Adam was brought into the world; however, these human-like beings do not fit the theological description of "humans". From a theological perspective, they're not true humans, but they are biologically human, since they fit the taxonomical description for it. Adam is still considered to be the first human from a theological perspective. Adamic exceptionalism also asserts that the early descendants of Adam mated or hybridized with these "human-like beings", yielding one lineage that leads to Adam and another that leads to FUCA. This belief is considered to be the most viable because it synthesizes the miraculous creation of Adam and Eve and agrees with Muslim theology. At the same time, it is considered as compatible with evolutionary science—any questions regarding Adam and his miraculous creation, the lineage that leads to him, or whether this lineage mated with other "human-like" beings are irrelevant to science and are not obstacles to any established scientific theories.

David Solomon Jalajel, an Islamic author, proclaims an Adamic exceptionalism view of evolution which encourages the theological use of tawaqquf; a tawaqquf is to make no argument for or against a matter to which scripture possesses no declarations for. With tawaqquf, Jalajel believes that Adam's creation does not necessarily signal the beginning of humanity as the Quran makes no declaration as to whether or not human beings were on Earth before Adam had descended. As a result, Jalajel invokes tawaqquf which insinuates that it is possible for humans to exist or not exist before the appearance of Adam on earth with either belief being possible due to the Quran, and that it is possible that an intermingling of Adam's descendants and other humans may or may not have occurred. Thus, the existence of Adam is a miracle since the Quran directly states it to be, but it does not assert there being no humans who could have existed at the time of Adam's appearance on earth and who could have come about as a result of evolution. This viewpoint stands in contrast to creationism and human exceptionalism, ultimately declaring that evolution could be viewed without conflict with Islam and that Muslims could either accept or reject "human evolution on its scientific merits without reference to the story of Adam".

"Human exceptionalism" is theologically compatible, but has some issues with science due to the rejection of common ancestry of modern humans. "Non-exceptionalism" is scientifically compatible, but its theological validity is a matter of debate.

Proponents of human-exceptionalism include: Yasir Qadhi, Nuh Ha Mim Keller, etc. Proponents of Adamic-exceptionalism include David Solomon Jalajel. Proponents of non-exceptionalism include: Rana Dajani, Nidhal Guessoum, Israr Ahmed, Caner Taslaman, etc.

=== Acceptance ===
The theory of evolution is controversial in plenty of contemporary Muslim societies due to negative social views and misconceptions such as "the theory is atheistic" and lack of understanding about views such as human exceptionalism and Adamic exceptionalism. A lot of people suggest that it also has a lot to do with lack of proper scientific facilities and development in a lot (but not all) Muslim countries, particularly where there exists a lot of conflict and political tension. Regardless, a large majority of Muslims accept evolution in Kazakhstan (79%) and Lebanon (78%). However relatively few in Afghanistan (26%) and Iraq (27%) believe in human evolution. Most other Muslim countries have statistics in between. Belief in theistic evolution is increasing in a lot of Muslim countries and societies. The younger generations have a higher rate of acceptance. Countries more developed or developing faster also have higher rates of acceptance. Muslim societies in non-Muslim countries (such as in the West) are inconsistent and can be high or low depending on the specific countries.

== Relationship to other positions ==
=== 19th-century 'theistic evolution' ===
The American botanist Asa Gray used the name "theistic evolution" in a now-obsolete sense for his point of view, presented in his 1876 book Essays and Reviews Pertaining to Darwinism. He argued that the deity supplies beneficial mutations to guide evolution. St George Jackson Mivart argued instead in his 1871 On the Genesis of Species that the deity, equipped with foreknowledge, sets the direction of evolution (orthogenesis) by specifying the laws that govern it, and leaves species to evolve according to the conditions they experience as time goes by. The Duke of Argyll set out similar views in his 1867 book The Reign of Law. The historian Edward J. Larson stated that the theory failed as an explanation in the minds of biologists from the late 19th century onwards as it broke the rules of methodological naturalism which they had grown to expect.

=== Non-theistic evolution ===
The major criticism of theistic evolution by non-theistic evolutionists focuses on its essential belief in a supernatural creator. Physicist Lawrence Krauss considers that, by the application of Occam's razor, sufficient explanation of the phenomena of evolution is provided by natural processes (in particular, natural selection), and the intervention or direction of a supernatural entity is not required. Evolutionary biologist Richard Dawkins considers theistic evolution a "superfluous attempt" to "smuggle God in by the back door".

=== Intelligent design ===
A number of notable proponents of theistic evolution, including Kenneth R. Miller, John Haught, George Coyne, Simon Conway Morris, Denis Alexander, Ard Louis, Darrel Falk, Alister McGrath, Francisco J. Ayala, and Francis Collins are critics of intelligent design.

=== Young Earth creationism ===
Young Earth creationists such as Ken Ham prefer to criticize theistic evolution on theological grounds rather than on any scientific data, finding it hard to reconcile the nature of a loving God with the process of evolution, in particular, the existence of death and suffering before the Fall of Man. They consider that it undermines central biblical teachings by regarding the creation account as a myth, a parable, or an allegory, instead of treating it as an accurate record of historical events. They also fear that a capitulation to what they call "atheistic" naturalism will confine God to the gaps in scientific explanations, undermining biblical doctrines, such as God's incarnation through Christ.

== See also ==
- American Scientific Affiliation
- The BioLogos Foundation
- Day-age creationism
- Deistic evolution
- "Epic of evolution"
- Natural theology
- Orthogenesis
- Old Earth creationism
- Religious naturalism
- Teleology in biology
- Fine-tuned universe

== Sources ==
- Artigas, Mariano; Glick, Thomas F.; Martínez, Rafael A. (2006). Negotiating Darwin: the Vatican confronts evolution, 1877–1902. Baltimore: Johns Hopkins University Press. ISBN 9780801883897.
- Bowler, Peter J. (1992). The Eclipse of Darwinism: anti-Darwinian evolutionary theories in the decades around 1900. Johns Hopkins University Press. ISBN 978-0-8018-4391-4.
- Bowler, Peter J. (2003). Evolution:The History of an Idea. University of California Press. ISBN 978-0-520-23693-6.
- Brundell, Barry, "Catholic Church Politics and Evolution Theory, 1894-1902", The British Journal for the History of Science, Vol. 34, No. 1 (Mar., 2001), pp. 81–95, Cambridge University Press on behalf of The British Society for the History of Science, JSTOR 4028040
- Desmond, Adrian J.; Moore, James Richard (1991) [1969]. Darwin. Michael Joseph.
- Kung, Hans, beginning of all things: science and religion, trans. John Bowden, Wm. B. Eerdmans Publishing, 2007, ISBN 978-0-8028-0763-2 ]
- Larson, Edward J. (2004). Evolution: The Remarkable History of Scientific Theory. Modern Library. ISBN 978-0-679-64288-6.
- Numbers, Ronald L. (1993) [1992]. The Creationists: The Evolution of Scientific Creationism. University of California Press. ISBN 9780520083936.
- Numbers, Ronald (November 30, 2006). The Creationists: From Scientific Creationism to Intelligent Design, Expanded Edition. Harvard University Press. ISBN 978-0-674-02339-0.
- Rahner, Karl (1975). Encyclopedia of Theology: A Concise Sacramentum Mundi. Continuum International Publishing Group. ISBN 978-0-8601-2006-3.
- Scott, Eugenie C. (1997). "Antievolution and Creationism in the United States". Annual Review of Anthropology. 26: 263–289. doi:10.1146/annurev.anthro.26.1.263. JSTOR 2952523.
