= Special creation =

Religious term with multiple uses

In Christian theology, special creation is a term with varying meanings dependent on context.

In creationism, the term refers to a belief that the universe and all life in it originated in its present form by fiat or divine decree. In Christianity, this is liturgically celebrated as the Feast of Creation.

Catholicism uses the phrase "special creation" in two different senses:

- in the context of theistic evolution to refer to the "special creation of humans", a point of hominization where evolved near-human animals were given souls by God, and became fully human; this belief is also called special transformism by some scholars.
- to refer to the doctrine of immediate or special creation of each human soul

== Creationism ==
In creationism, "special creation" is a literal interpretation of the Genesis creation narrative, viewing it as an accurate description of the creation of the universe in essentially its present form over the course of six 24-hour days. (Note: A day is the period of time it takes for the Earth to complete one revolution on its axis (approximately 24 hours). However, in the first creation story the Earth is not created until the third stage of the process. The Earth therefore did not exist for the first two stages, so the concept of a day did not exist for the first two stages.)

Duane Gish of the Institute for Creation Research defined "special creation" as being creation using supernatural processes:

We do not know how the Creator created, [or] what processes He used, for He used processes which are not now operating anywhere in the natural universe. This is why we refer to creation as special creation. We cannot discover by scientific investigation anything about the creative processes used by the Creator.

Dennis Jensen of the American Scientific Affiliation states that special creation means that complex living things did not descend from simpler ones but were created independently.

James B. Stenson writes that for fundamentalists, special creation follows from a literal reading of the Genesis creation narrative. There is a "special creation" of each separate kind in six 24-hour days, starting a few thousand years ago.

In The Mystery of Life's Origin, Charles B. Thaxton argues for "Special Creation by a Creator beyond the Cosmos", and asserts that special creation holds "that the source that produced life was intelligent".

== In Catholicism ==
The Pontifical Biblical Commission issued a decree ratified by Pope Pius X on June 30, 1909, mentioning special creation only in relation to humans, not to the other species. In 2004, the International Theological Commission, then under the presidency of Cardinal Joseph Ratzinger (soon to be Pope Benedict XVI), published a paper in which it accepts the current scientific accounts of the history of the universe commencing in the Big Bang about 15 billion years ago and of the evolution of all life on earth including humans from the microorganisms commencing about 4 billion years ago. The Vatican teaches that God acted indirectly through causal chains operating from the beginning of cosmic history, which prepared the way for the moment of transition to the spiritual with the special creation of the human soul. This special creation, the Vatican says, established the basis for a divine intimacy which embraces every single human person from the first moment of his or her existence.
