= BioLogos =

Christian evolutionary advocacy organization

BioLogos Foundation
- Formation: 2007
- Legal status: Non-profit
- Headquarters: Grand Rapids, Michigan, United States
- President: Kristine Torjesen
- Website: biologos.org

The BioLogos Foundation is a Christian advocacy group that supports the view that God created the world using evolution of different species as the mechanism. It was established by Francis Collins in 2007 after receiving letters and emails from people who had read his book, The Language of God. The primary audience was Christians in the beginning, but Collins as well as later leaders of the organization have sought to engage with scientific skeptics as well as general audiences invested in biological science. BioLogos affirms evolutionary creation or theistic evolution as a core commitment.

== History ==
In his 2006 book The Language of God: A Scientist Presents Evidence for Belief, Francis Collins wrote that scientific discoveries were an "opportunity to worship" and that he rejected both Young Earth creationism and intelligent design. He wrote that his own belief was theistic evolution or evolutionary creation, which he described as "BioLogos", and that one can "think of DNA as an instructional script, a software program, sitting in the nucleus of the cell." He appeared on The Colbert Report and on Fresh Air radio to discuss his book. In an interview with D. J. Grothe on the Point of Inquiry podcast, he said that the overall aim of the book was to show that "one can be intellectually in a rigorous position and argue that science and faith can be compatible", and that he was prompted to write the book because "most people are seeking a possible harmony between these worldviews [science and faith], and it seems rather sad that we hear so little about this possibility.

In 2007, Collins founded the BioLogos Foundation to "contribute to the public voice that represents the harmony of science and faith." He served as the foundation's president until he was confirmed as director of the NIH. Collins has also spoken at the Veritas Forum on the relationship between science and religion and the existence of God.

From 2016 to 2022, the BioLogos Foundation published a series of books titled BioLogos Books on Science and Christianity. The series attempts to explain the relationship between religion and science, stressing that they are not at odds but rather coexist and together reveal God's plan for creation.

== Presidents ==
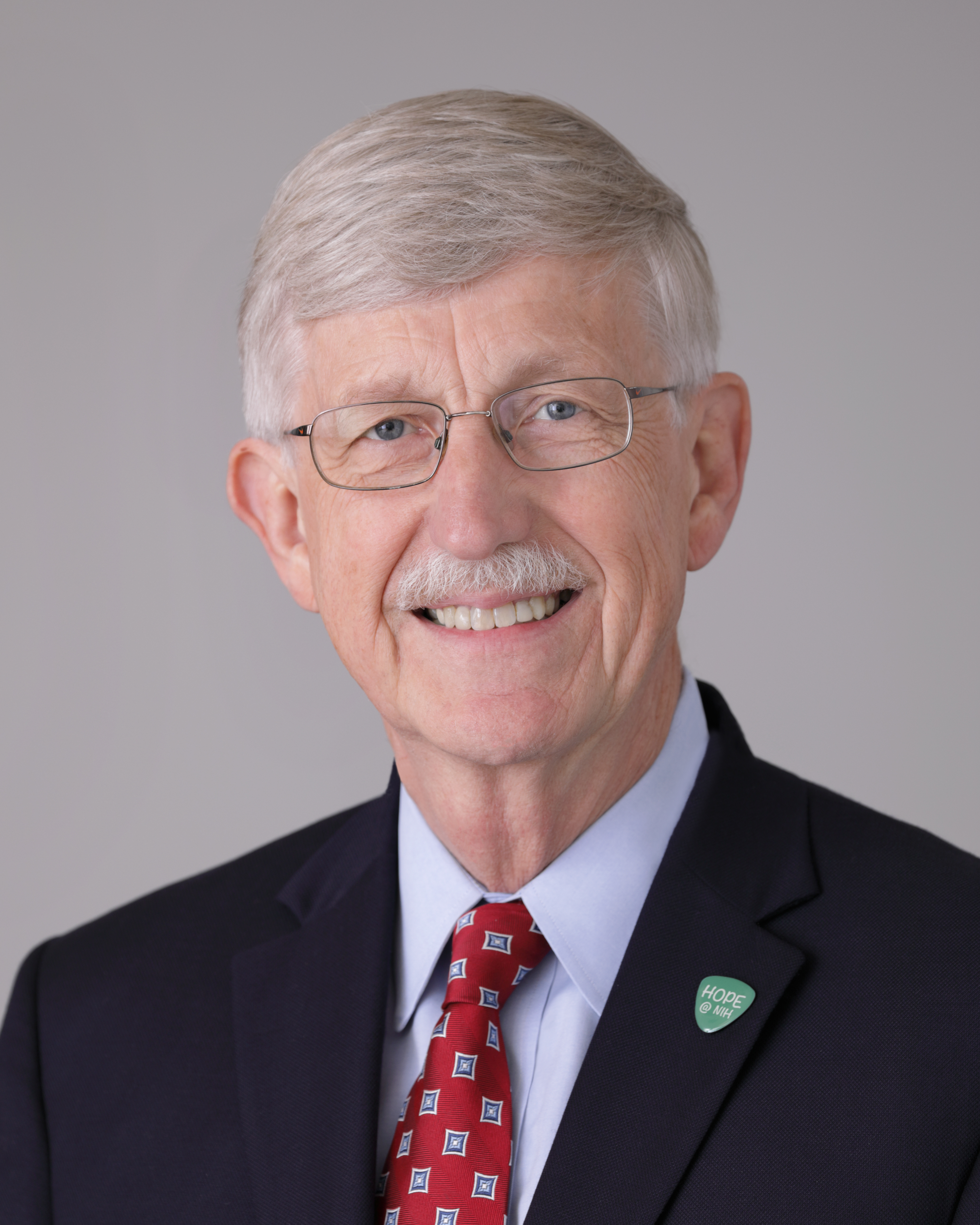
Founder Francis Collins is known primarily for having served both as leader of the Human Genome Project and as director of the National Institutes of Health.

The foundation has been led by the following presidents:

- Francis Collins (founded 2007 – 16 August 2009; resigned to become 16th director of the National Institutes of Health)
- Darrel R. Falk (16 August 2009 – January 2013)
- Deborah Haarsma (January 2013 – March 2025)
- Kristine Torjesen (March 2025 – present)

During the COVID-19 pandemic, BioLogos sponsored livestream events featuring the NIH director and BioLogos founder Francis Collins.

== Responses ==
BioLogos has received praise and positive responses. Supporters include Washington Post columnist Kathleen Parker, who has argued that the foundation's goal of "helping fundamentalists evolve can only be good for civilization."

Young earth creationists argue that BioLogos is one of the great compromisers of the Bible, accusing members of bowing to science over the clear Word of God. BioLogos counters that they affirm all the core tenets of the traditional Christian faith, and that their views on evolution are consistent with notable defenders of Christianity such as Augustine, an early church father, and B. B. Warfield, a staunch 19th century promoter of biblical inerrancy.

== Bibliography ==
- The Language of God: A Scientist Presents Evidence for Belief, by Francis Collins
