= Secondary causation =

Concept in philosophy

Secondary causation is the philosophical proposition that all material and corporeal objects, having been created by God with their own intrinsic potentialities, are subsequently empowered to evolve independently in accordance with natural law. Traditional Christians would slightly modify this injunction to allow for the occasional miracle as well as the exercise of free will. Deists who deny any divine interference after creation would only accept free will exceptions. That the physical universe is consequentially well-ordered, consistent, and knowable, subject to human observation and reason, was a primary theme of Scholasticism and further molded into the philosophy of the western tradition by Augustine of Hippo and later by Thomas Aquinas.

Secondary causation has been suggested as a necessary precursor for scientific inquiry into an established order of natural laws which are not entirely predicated on the changeable whims of a supernatural being. Nor does this create a conflict between science and religion for, given a creator deity, it is not inconsistent with the paradigm of a clockwork universe. It does not remove logical contradictions concerning the unfettered expression of man's free will which would otherwise require not just God's acquiescence but rather his direct intervention to implement.

== Volunteerism and occasionalism ==
According to the Hebrew Bible the phrase "free will" is accurate. Humans are given the "freedom to choose". We are told "Therefore choose life".

Occasionalism itself was derived from the earlier school of thought of volunteerism emanating from Al-Ash'ari who held that every particle in the universe must be constantly recreated each instant by God's direct intervention.

== Kabbalistic interpretation ==
According to the Kabbalah and in Chasidic philosophy in the Tanya composed by Rabbi Shneur Zalman of Liadi at the beginning of the 19th century, the will and desire to create the universe is integral to the creator's very essence and thought this being the source for all the physical and spiritual worlds.

Once the creator has created the universe and God knows and wants the creation as the one who created it in his very essence, God then enlivens and vivifies all parts of the universe at every moment or the physical universe and the many spiritual worlds would revert instantly to their source in the creator from where they came. At the same time as molecules move, human cells divide the creator must know the creation as it was a moment ago and makes allowance for the finite creations to grow and later slowly wither, and by the evaporation of water, the wearing down of rocks and soil, the birth, growth and weakening of the flesh of fish, animals and humans all creations as they are built from the 4 main spiritual worlds which also break down, they have a mirror on earth of air, fire, water, dust and slowly all created beings wear down by God's constant enlivening of them until each of the four elements return to their spiritual source which mirror the four elements. This is not an independent of God, rather it is all controlled by God's will.

Torah explains that before creation there was only God and nothing else as is seen in the highest Name the letter Yud. When it came time for creation the want and will of God to create a universe which meant expansion of the Holy Name the Holy Name Yud-Hey-Vav-Hey how this creation came about by God's use of the ten sefirot would be too great a task to explain here but basically we find "And God said let there be..."

The creation made no change in the creator. God was, is, and always will be but the creation is available to those created as an order always vivified by God since God must know the creation in order to keep it as it is, yet allow for his change according to his will. The body sees a creation while the soul sees only the infinite One God.

Having the gift from God, "the freedom to choose" to serve God and always do God's will here on earth makes us partners in creation. Being that God's will was revealed to the Israelites on Mount Sinai and spread to the world in the Torah we have freedom to choose to do so. If a human does the opposite of God's will it is in God's realm to alter the cosmic plan of creation that he himself devised, that he himself wants but since nothing exists but God, including the universe and this "nothing" is not above the knowledge that "nothing is too hard for God" and "Our wisdom is not His Wisdom", it is a fundamental theme in Torah that we must do God's will yet we have freedom to serve or not and if we go against God's will, it is still a lack on our part as partners with God here on earth but this itself is God's will and will not upset the cosmic original plan.

We see this when Shimi cursed King David and threw stones at him that King David did not get angry since he realized that Shimi was an agent from God himself or Shimi could not possibly use his physical God-given talents to speak or throw stones if God did not want. Even though Shimi was not told by God, Shimi used his freedom to serve in the wrong way, but if Shimi had not cursed David at God's will, "God has many messengers to do His will".

In fact the Tree of the Knowledge of Good and Evil was created before Adam by God and this is all part of his plan, to turn away from evil.

== Opposing philosophy of double truth ==
The concept of there being two distinct truths, even concerning the same object or phenomena, was most notably developed by Averroes (1126-1198 from Spain). Separating the sanctity of religious revelation from the practical world of physical observation was an attempt to circumvent proscriptions on the discredited rationalist heresy of Muʿtazila, which had heretofore not gained traction in any venue.

Following Augustine and many others, this concept of double truth was soundly rejected by Aquinas in his Summa Theologiae which reiterated the long established view in the West that there can be only one truth. The original quote from Augustine was:

In matters that are obscure and far beyond our vision, even in such as we may find treated in Holy Scripture, different Interpretations are sometimes possible without prejudice to the faith we have received. In such a case, we should not rush in headlong and so firmly take our stand on one side that, if further progress in the search of truth justly undermines this position, we too fall with it. That would be to battle not for the teaching of Holy Scripture but for our own, wishing its teaching to conform to ours, whereas we ought to wish ours to conform to that of Sacred Scripture."

== Philosophical support ==
The assignment of intrinsic qualities to objects which can mutate and evolve of their own accord without divine intervention was a crucial step in the transformation of the rational logic of the Greeks into the scientific method in the Western Tradition of the late Middle Ages. Because man could thus observe and characterize the natural flow of events without impugning the prerogatives of supernatural forces, burgeoning philosopher-scientists became free to experiment and especially to question and debate the results.

In Western Europe this rationale was further strengthened by the motivation that science was uniquely able not only to efficiently manage the world as charged to do so in Genesis but also to be able to distinguish miracles from natural occurrences.

One of the first to take advantage of this opportunity was Albertus Magnus of Cologne (1193-1206), who wrote:

In studying nature we have not to inquire how God the Creator may, as He freely wills, use His creatures to work miracles and thereby show forth His power; we have rather to inquire what Nature with its immanent causes can naturally bring to pass.

This sentiment was echoed in various European forums of the day notably by the secular Professor of Theology at the University of Paris, John Buridan (1300-1361) who liberally commented on the works of Aristotle.

It should also be noted that [when we ask whether metaphysics is the same as wisdom,] we are not comparing metaphysics to theology, which proceeds from beliefs that are not known, because although these beliefs are not known per se and most evident, we hold without doubt that theology is the more principal discipline and that it is wisdom most properly speaking. In this question, however, we are merely asking about intellectual habits based on human reason, [i.e.,] those discovered by the process of reasoning, which are deduced from what is evident to us. For it is in this sense that Aristotle calls metaphysics ‘theology’ and ‘the divine science’. Accordingly, metaphysics differs from theology in the fact that although each considers God and those things that pertain to divinity, metaphysics only considers them as regards what can be proved and implied, or inductively inferred, by demonstrative reason.
