= Christian culture =

Cultural practices common to Christianity

Examples of Christian culture
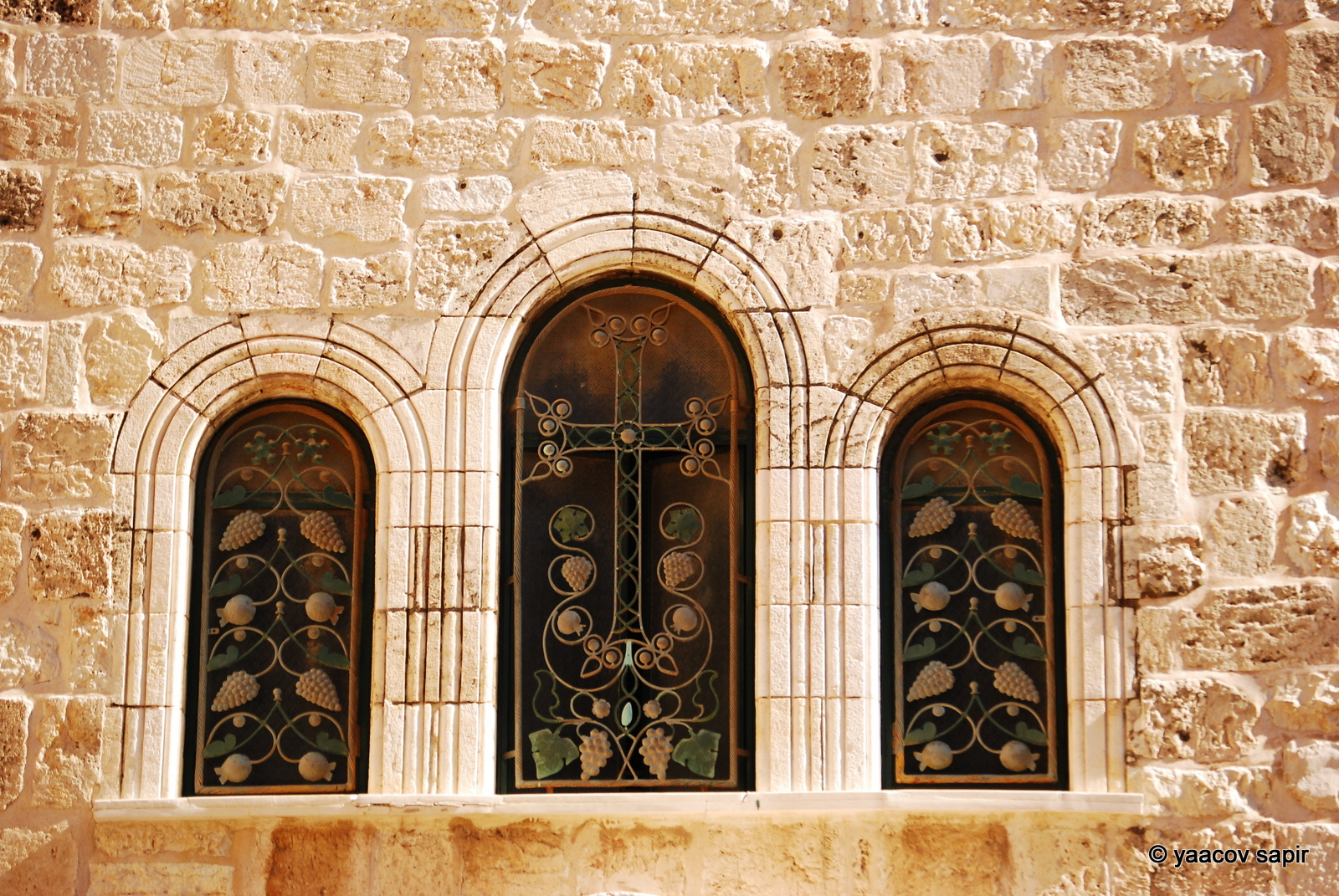
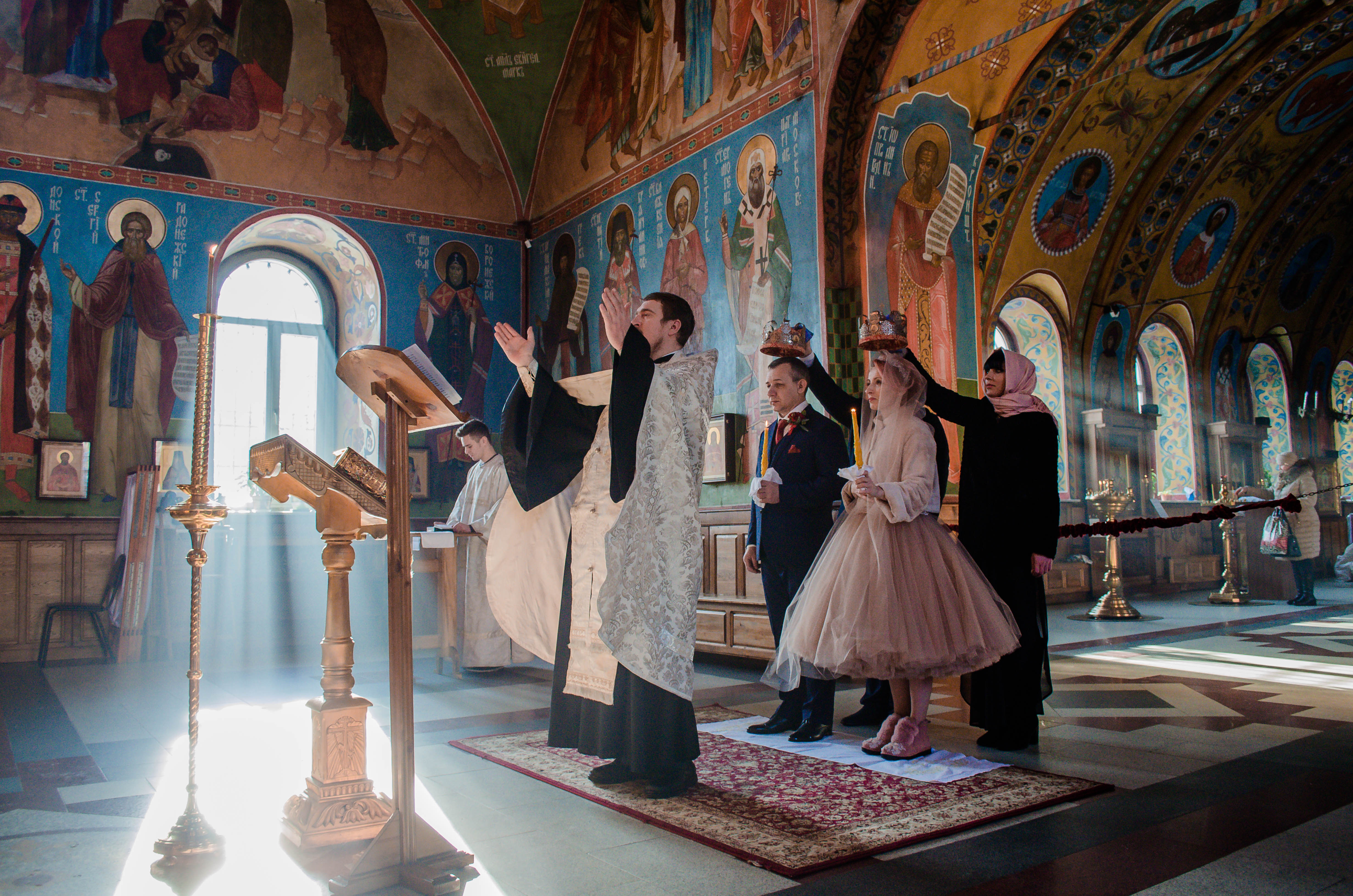
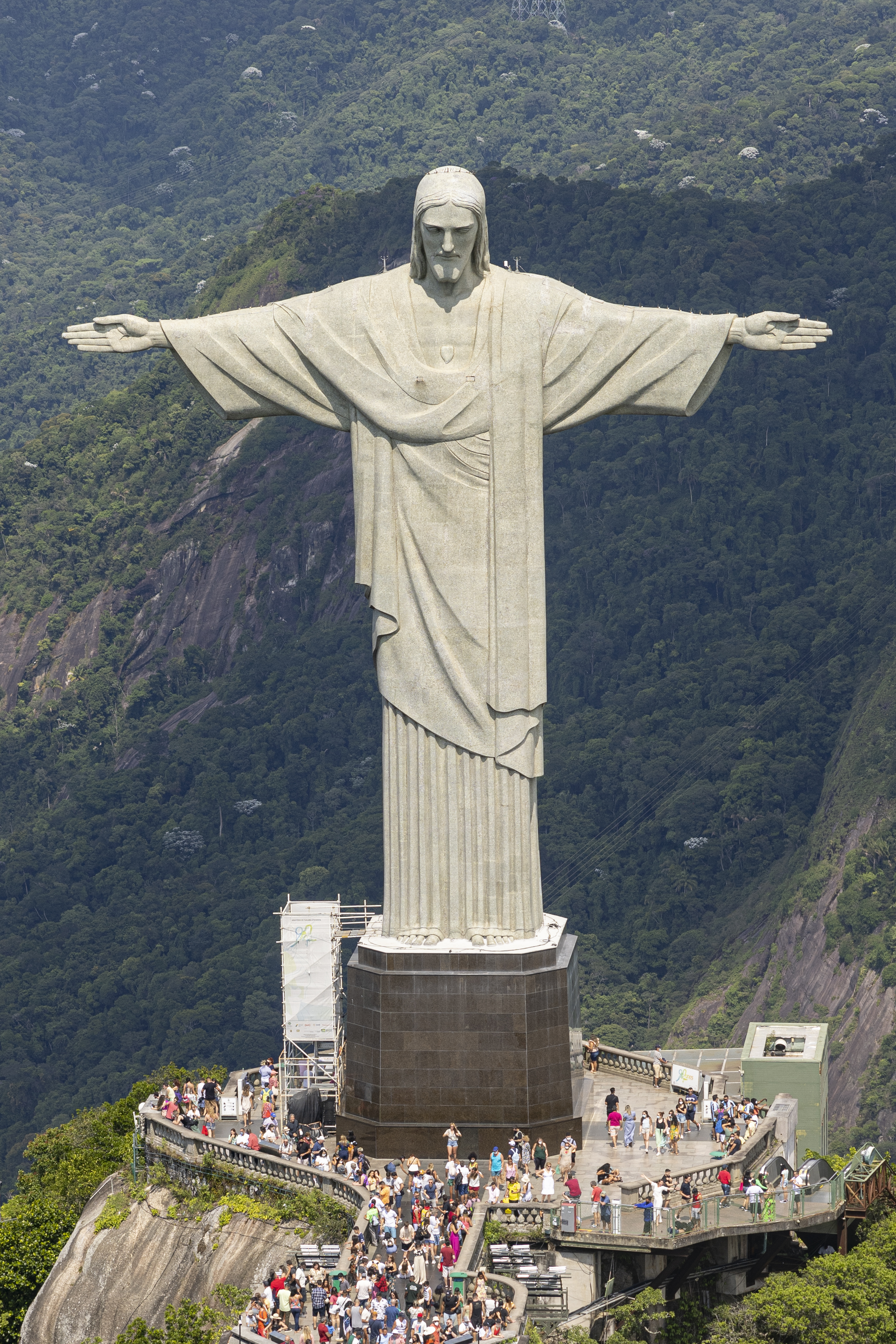
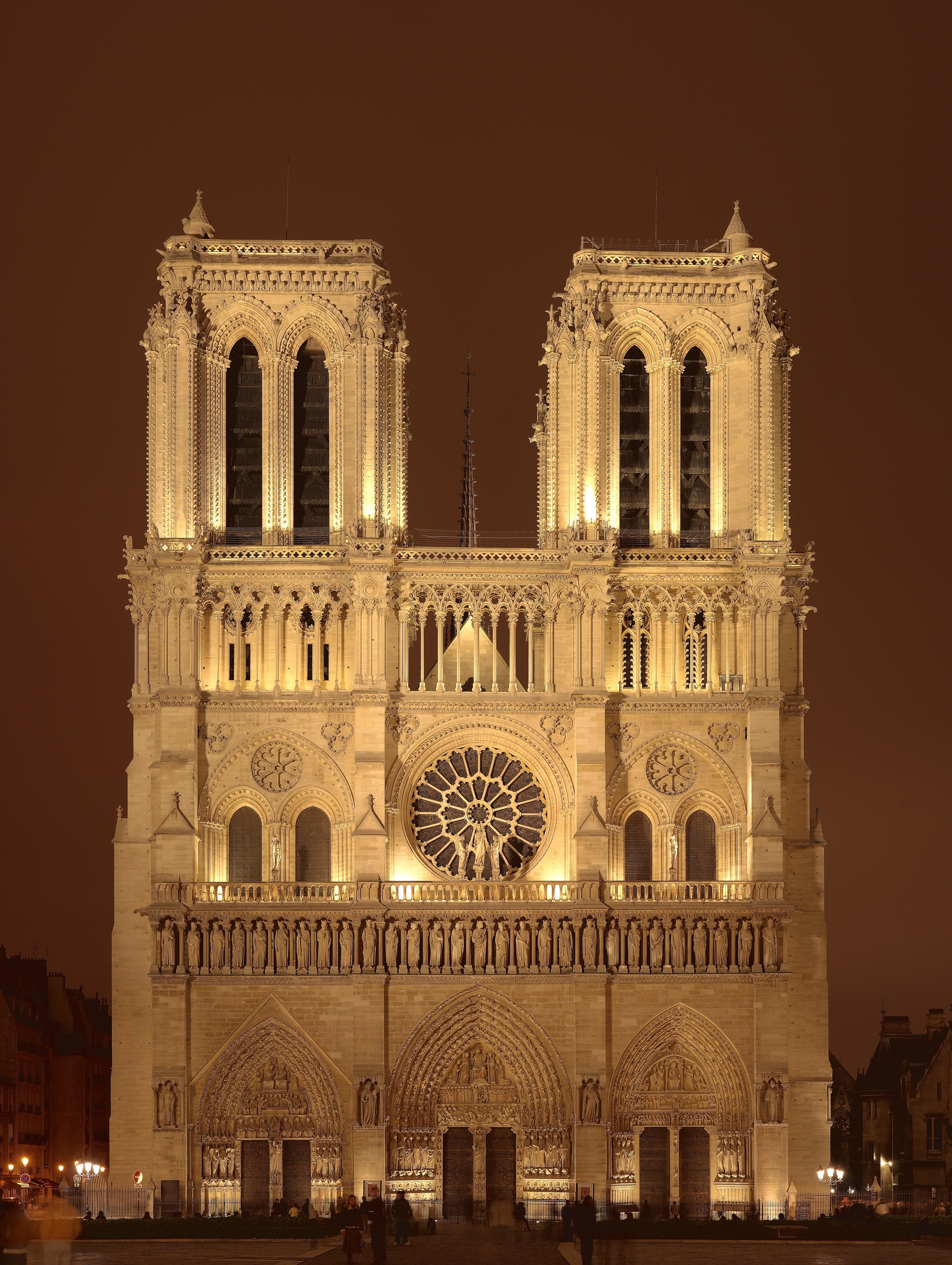
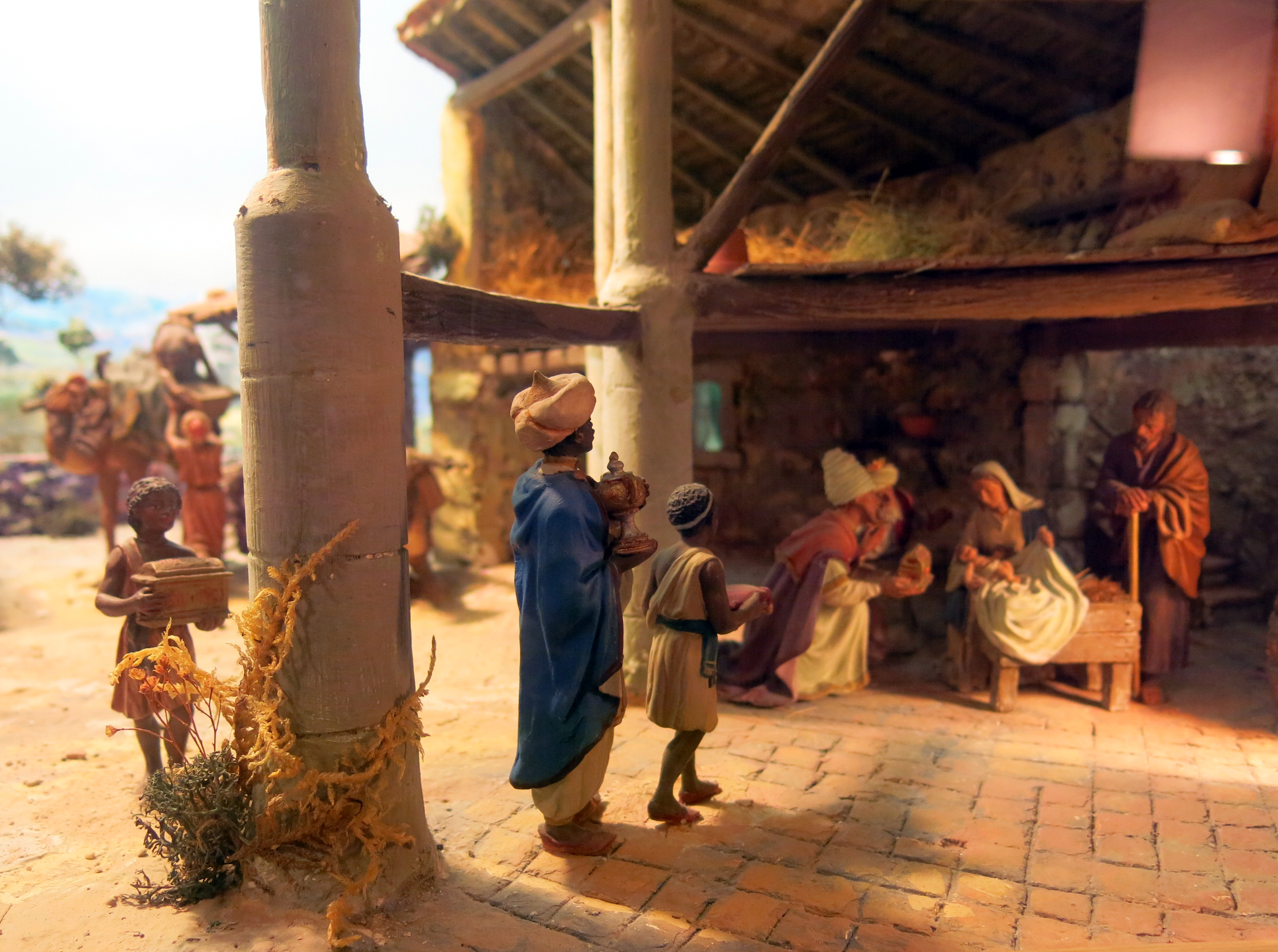
Clockwise from top: Windows of the Church of the Holy Sepulchre in Jerusalem, Christ the Redeemer statue in Rio de Janeiro, Nativity scene, Notre-Dame cathedral in Paris, Eastern Orthodox wedding

Christian culture generally includes all the cultural practices which have developed around the religion of Christianity. There are variations in the application of Christian beliefs in different cultures and traditions.

Christian culture has influenced and assimilated much from the Middle Eastern, Greco-Roman, Byzantine, Western culture, Slavic and Caucasian culture. During the early Roman Empire, Christendom has been divided in the pre-existing Greek East and Latin West. Consequently, different versions of the Christian cultures arose with their own rites and practices, Christianity remains culturally diverse in its Western and Eastern branches.

Christianity played a prominent role in the development of Western civilization, in particular, the Catholic Church and Protestantism. Western culture, throughout most of its history, has been nearly equivalent to Christian culture. Outside the Western world, Christianity has had an influence on various cultures, such as in Latin America, Africa and Asia.

Christians have made noted contributions to human progress in a broad and diverse range of fields, both historically and in modern times, including science and technology, medicine, fine arts and architecture, politics, literature, music, philanthropy, philosophy, ethics, humanism, theatre and business.

== Cultural influence ==
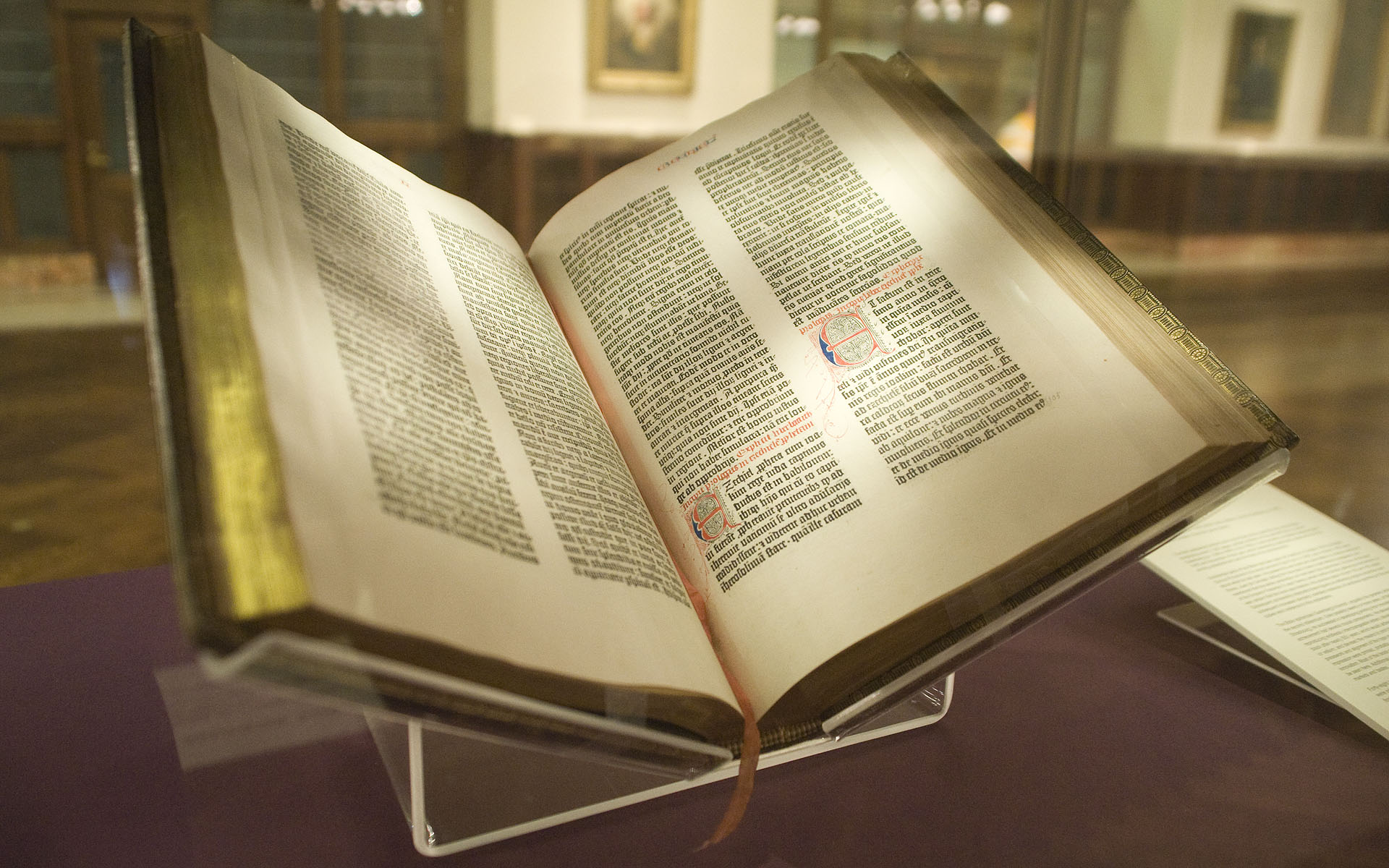
Gutenberg Bible, was the earliest major book printed using mass-produced movable metal type in West.

The Bible has had a profound influence on Western civilization and on cultures around the globe; it has contributed to the formation of Western law, art, texts, and education. With a literary tradition spanning two millennia, the Bible is one of the most influential works ever written. From practices of personal hygiene to philosophy and ethics, the Bible has directly and indirectly influenced politics and law, war and peace, sexual morals, marriage and family life, toilet etiquette, letters and learning, the arts, economics, social justice, medical care and more. The Gutenberg Bible was the first book printed in Europe using movable type.

Since the spread of Christianity from the Levant to Asia Minor, Mesopotamia, Europe, North Africa and Horn of Africa during the early Roman Empire, Christendom has been divided in the pre-existing Greek East and Latin West. Consequently, different versions of the Christian cultures arose with their own rites and practices, centered around the cities such as Rome (Western Christianity) and Carthage, whose communities was called Western or Latin Christendom, and Constantinople (Eastern Christianity), Antioch (Syriac Christianity), Kerala (Indian Christianity) and Alexandria, among others, whose communities were called Eastern or Oriental Christendom. The Byzantine Empire was one of the peaks in Christian history and Christian civilization. From the 11th to 13th centuries, Latin Christendom rose to the central role of the Western world and Western culture.

Outside the Western world, Christianity has had an influence on various cultures, such as in Africa, the Near East, Middle East, Central Asia, East Asia, Southeast Asia, and the Indian subcontinent. Scholars and intellectuals agree Christians in the Middle East have made significant contributions to Arab and Islamic civilization since the introduction of Islam, and they have had a significant impact contributing the culture of the Mashriq, Turkey, and Iran. Eastern Christian scientists and scholars of the medieval Islamic world (particularly Jacobite and Nestorian Christians) contributed to the Arab Islamic civilization during the reign of the Umayyad and the Abbasid, by translating works of Greek philosophers to Syriac and afterwards, to Arabic. They also excelled in philosophy, science, theology, and medicine.

Historian Paul Legutko of Stanford University said the Catholic Church is "at the center of the development of the values, ideas, science, laws, and institutions which constitute what we call Western civilization." The Eastern Orthodox Church has played a prominent role in the history and culture of Eastern and Southeastern Europe, the Caucasus, and the Near East. The Oriental Orthodox Churches have played a prominent role in the history and culture of Armenia, Egypt, Turkey, Eritrea, Ethiopia, Sudan and parts of the Middle East and India. Protestants have extensively developed a unique culture that has made major contributions in education, the humanities and sciences, the political and social order, the economy and the arts, and many other fields.

=== Influence on Western culture ===
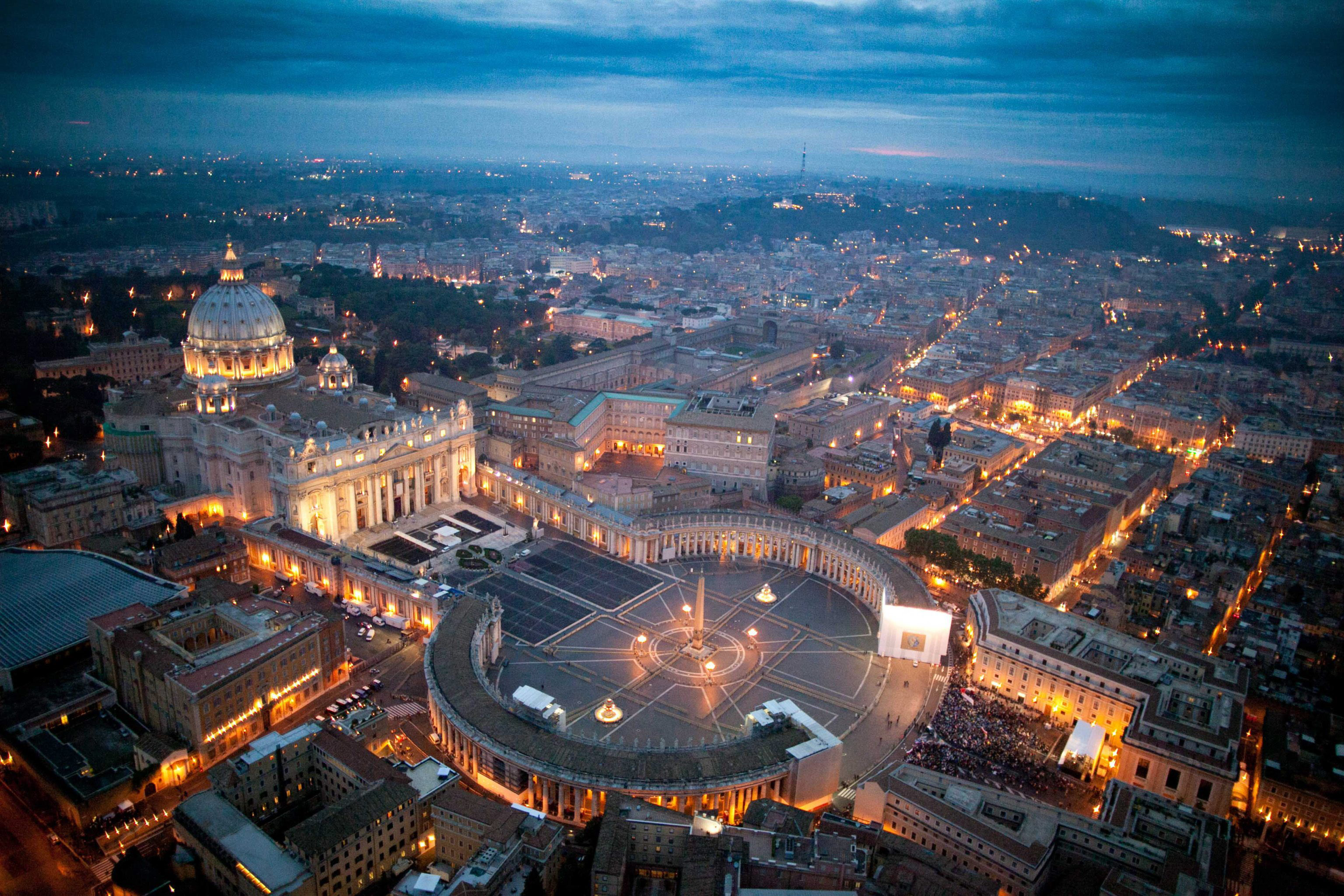
Vatican City and St. Peter's Basilica.

Christianity played a prominent role in the development of Western civilization, in particular, the Catholic Church and Protestantism. Western culture, throughout most of its history, has been nearly equivalent to Christian culture, and much of the population of the Western hemisphere could broadly be described as cultural Christians. The notion of Europe and the Western world has been intimately connected with the concept of Christianity and Christendom, many even consider Christianity to be the link that created a unified European identity, although some progress originated elsewhere: Renaissance and Romanticism began with the curiosity and passion of the pagan world of old.

Although Western culture contained several polytheistic religions during its early years under the Greek and Roman Empires, as the centralized Roman power waned, the dominance of the Catholic Church was the only consistent force in Western Europe. Until the Age of Enlightenment, Christian culture guided the course of philosophy, literature, art, music, and science. Christian disciplines of the respective arts have subsequently developed into Christian philosophy, Christian art, Christian music, Christian literature, etc. Art and literature, law, education, and politics were preserved in the teachings of the Church, in an environment that, otherwise, would have probably seen their loss. The Church founded many cathedrals, universities, monasteries and seminaries, some of which continue to exist today. Medieval Christianity created the first modern universities. The Catholic Church established a hospital system in medieval Europe that vastly improved upon the Roman valetudinaria. These hospitals were established to cater to "particular social groups marginalized by poverty, sickness, and age", according to historian of hospitals, Guenter Risse. Christianity also had a strong impact on all other aspects of life: marriage and family, education, the humanities and sciences, the political and social order, the economy, and the arts.

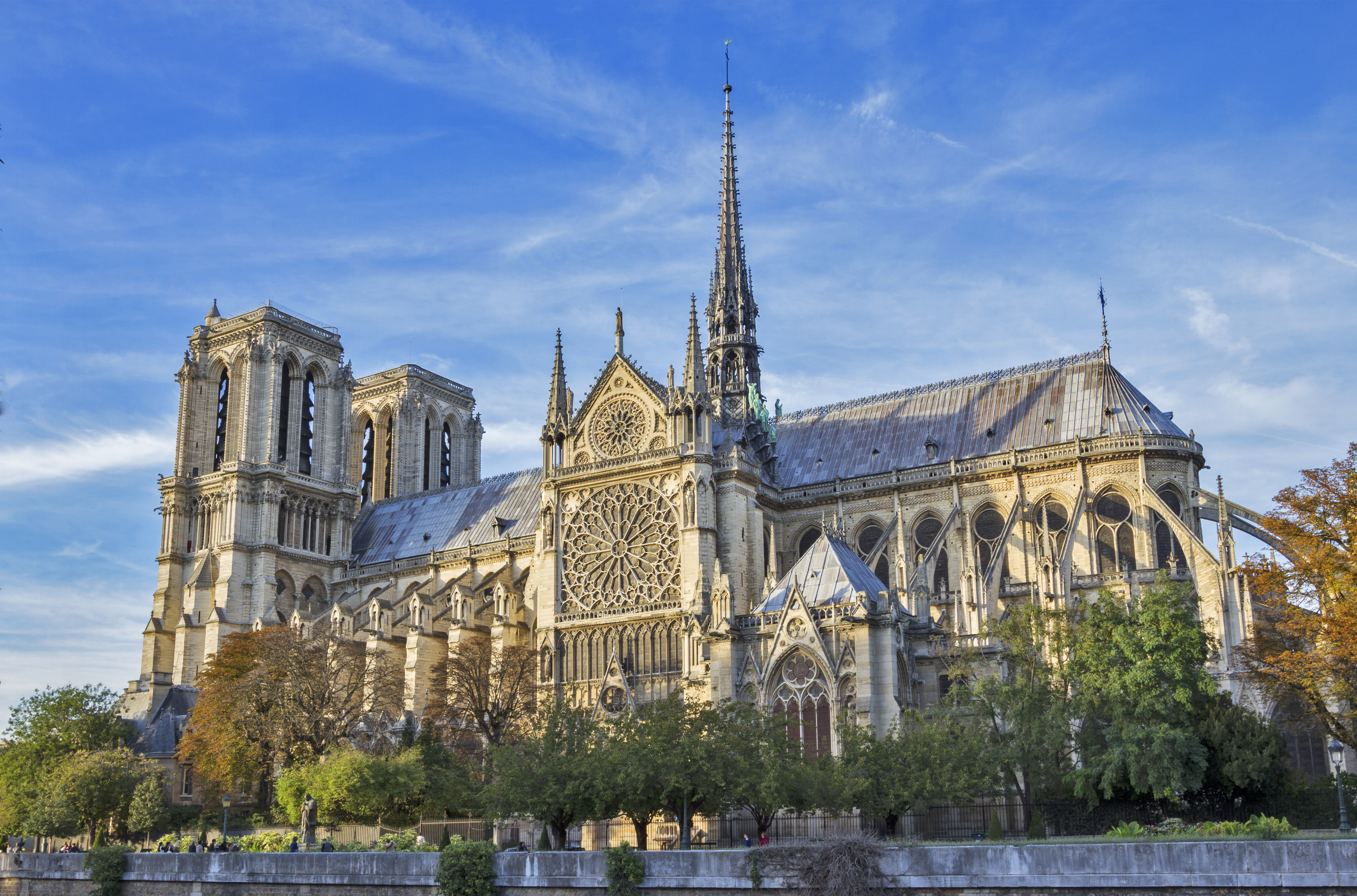
Notre-Dame de Paris in Paris, France, is among the most recognizable symbols of the civilization of Christendom.

Christianity had a significant impact on education and science and medicine as the church created the basis of the Western system of education, and was the sponsor of founding universities in the Western world as the university is generally regarded as an institution that has its origin in the Medieval Christian setting. Many clerics throughout history have made significant contributions to science and Jesuits in particular have made numerous significant contributions to the development of science. Some scholars state that Christianity contributed to the rise of the Scientific Revolution. Protestantism also has had an important influence on science. According to the Merton Thesis, there was a positive correlation between the rise of English Puritanism and German Pietism on the one hand, and early experimental science on the other.

The cultural influence of Christianity includes social welfare, founding hospitals, economics (as the Protestant work ethic), natural law (which would later influence the creation of international law), politics, architecture, literature, personal hygiene (ablution), and family life. Historically, extended families were the basic family unit in the Christian culture and countries.

Christianity played a role in ending practices common among pagan societies, such as human sacrifice, slavery, infanticide and polygamy. Scientists such as Newton and Galileo believed that God would be better understood if God's creation was better understood.

== Architecture ==
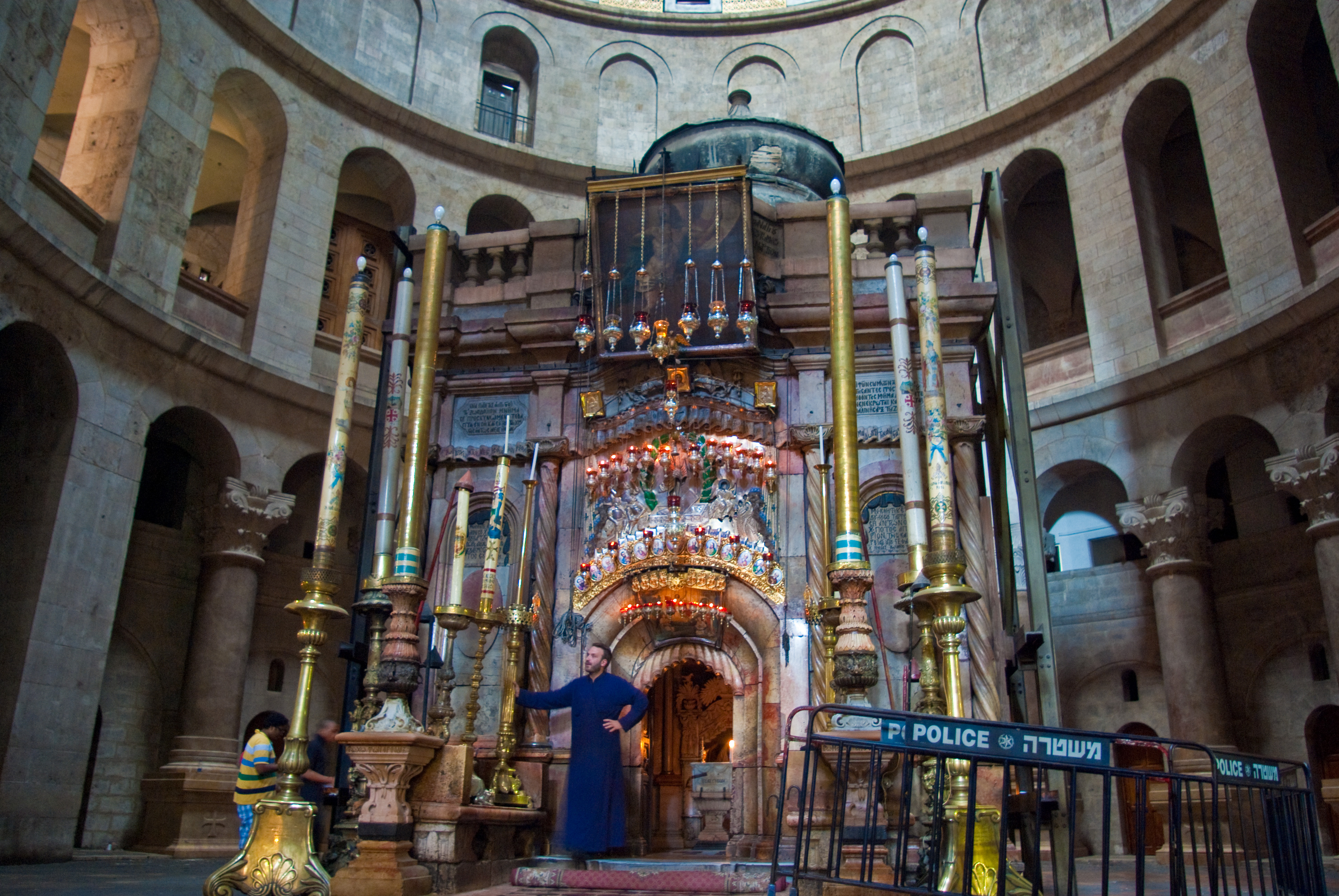
Tomb of Jesus in the Holy Sepulchre church in Jerusalem.

The architecture of cathedrals, basilicas and abbey churches is characterised by the buildings' large scale and follows one of several branching traditions of form, function and style that all ultimately derive from the Early Christian architectural traditions established in the Constantinian period.

Cathedrals in particular, as well as many abbey churches and basilicas, have certain complex structural forms that are found less often in parish churches. They also tend to display a higher level of contemporary architectural style and the work of accomplished craftsmen, and occupy a status both ecclesiastical and social that an ordinary parish church does not have. Such a cathedral or great church is generally one of the finest buildings within its region and is a focus of local pride. Many cathedrals and basilicas, and a number of abbey churches are among the world's most renowned works of architecture. These include St. Peter's Basilica, Notre Dame de Paris, Cologne Cathedral, Salisbury Cathedral, Prague Cathedral, Lincoln Cathedral, the Basilica of St Denis, the Basilica of Santa Maria Maggiore, the Basilica of San Vitale, St Mark's Basilica, Westminster Abbey, Saint Basil's Cathedral, Washington National Cathedral, Basilica of the National Shrine of the Immaculate Conception, Cathedral Basilica of Saint Louis, Gaudí's incomplete Sagrada Familia and the ancient church of Hagia Sophia, now a museum. Hagia Sophia has been described as architectural and cultural icon of Byzantine and Eastern Orthodox civilization.

The earliest large churches date from Late Antiquity. As Christianity and the construction of churches and cathedrals spread throughout the world, their manner of building was dependent upon local materials and local techniques. Different styles of architecture developed and their fashion spread, carried by the establishment of monastic orders, by the posting of bishops from one region to another and by the travelling of master stonemasons who served as architects. The styles of the great church buildings are successively known as Early Christian, Byzantine, Romanesque, Gothic, Renaissance, Baroque, various Revival styles of the late 18th to early 20th centuries and Modern. Overlaid on each of the academic styles are the regional characteristics. Some of these characteristics are so typical of a particular country or region that they appear, regardless of style, in the architecture of churches designed many centuries apart.

Saint Basil's Cathedral

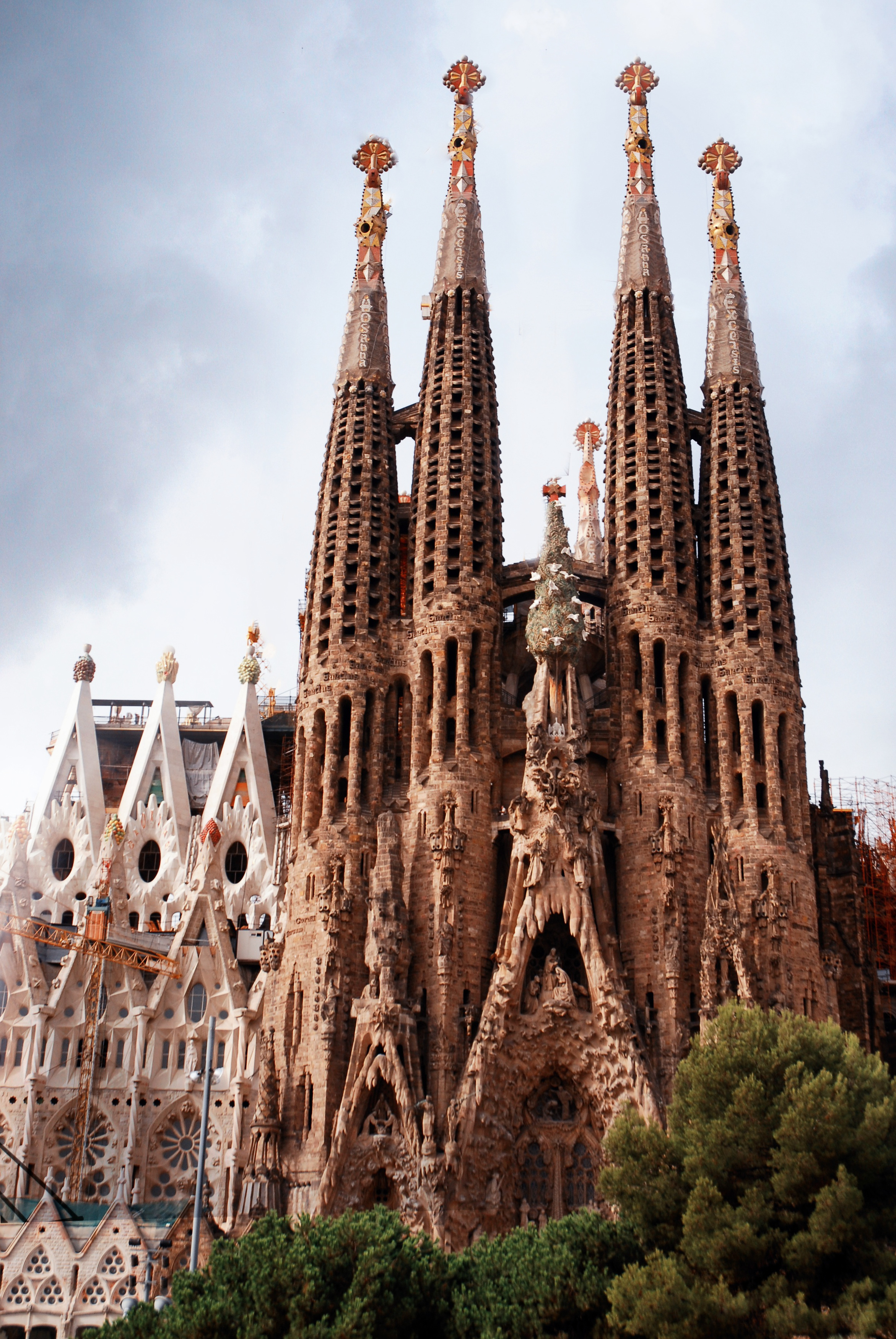
Sagrada Família

Hagia Sophia

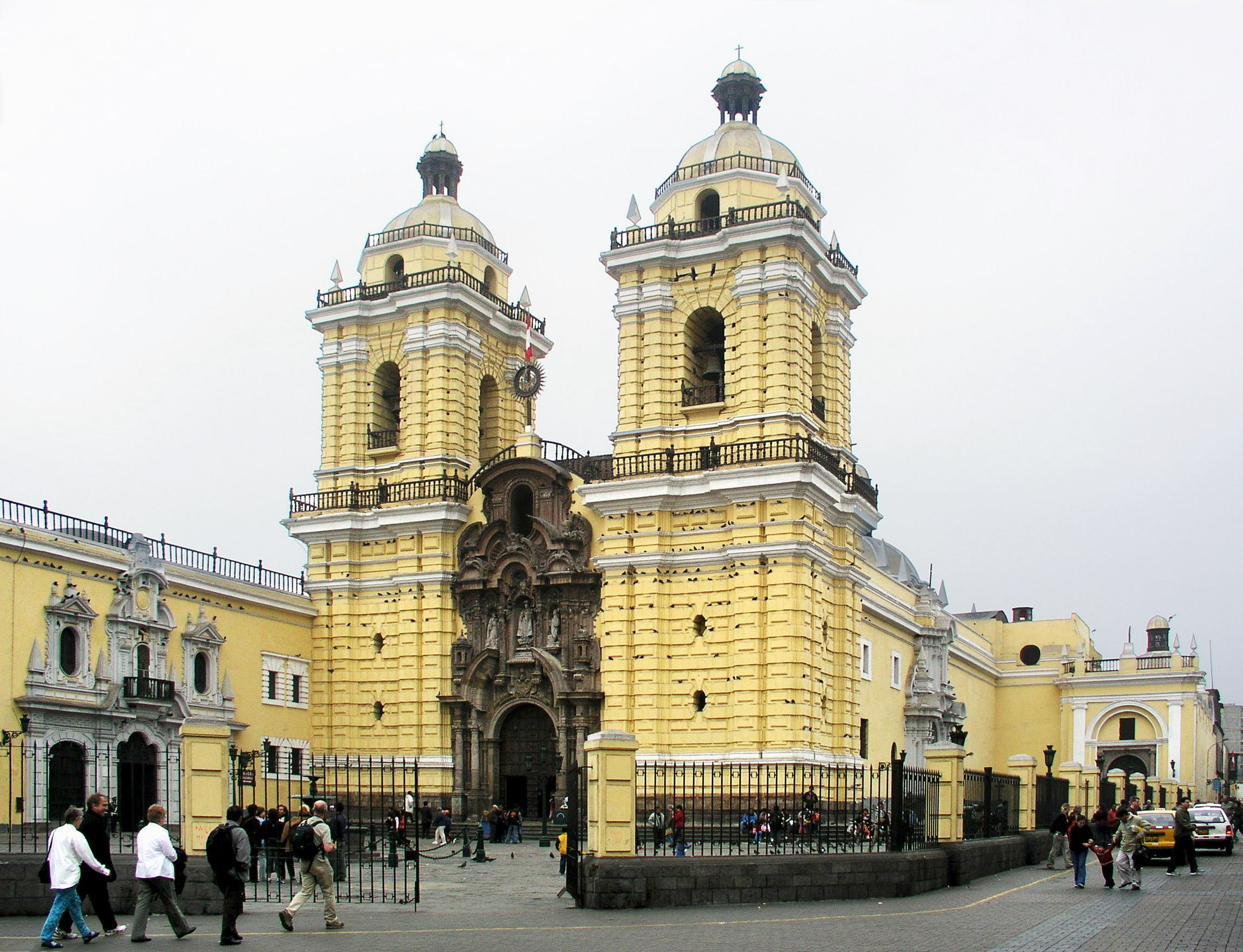
San Francisco de Asís Church

Florence Cathedral

== Art ==
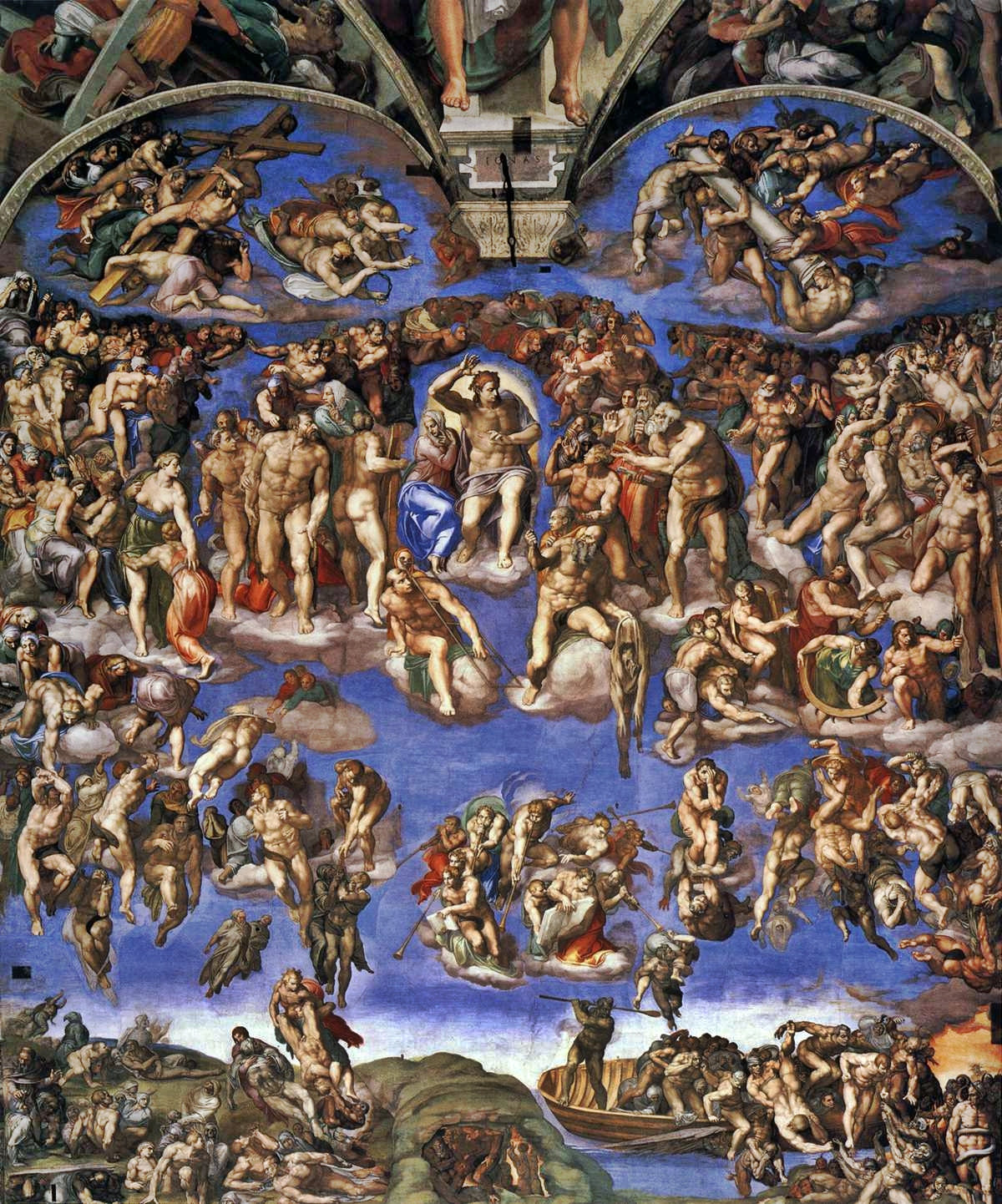
The Last Judgment by Michelangelo

Christian art is sacred art which uses themes and imagery from Christianity. Most Christian groups use or have used art to some extent, although some have had strong objections to some forms of religious image, and there have been major periods of iconoclasm within Christianity.

Images of Jesus and narrative scenes from the Life of Christ are the most common subjects, and scenes from the Old Testament play a part in the art of most denominations. Images of the Virgin Mary and saints are much rarer in Protestant art than that of Roman Catholicism and Eastern Orthodoxy.

Christianity makes far wider use of images than related religions, in which figurative representations are forbidden, such as Islam and Judaism. However, there is also a considerable history of aniconism in Christianity from various periods.

=== Illumination ===
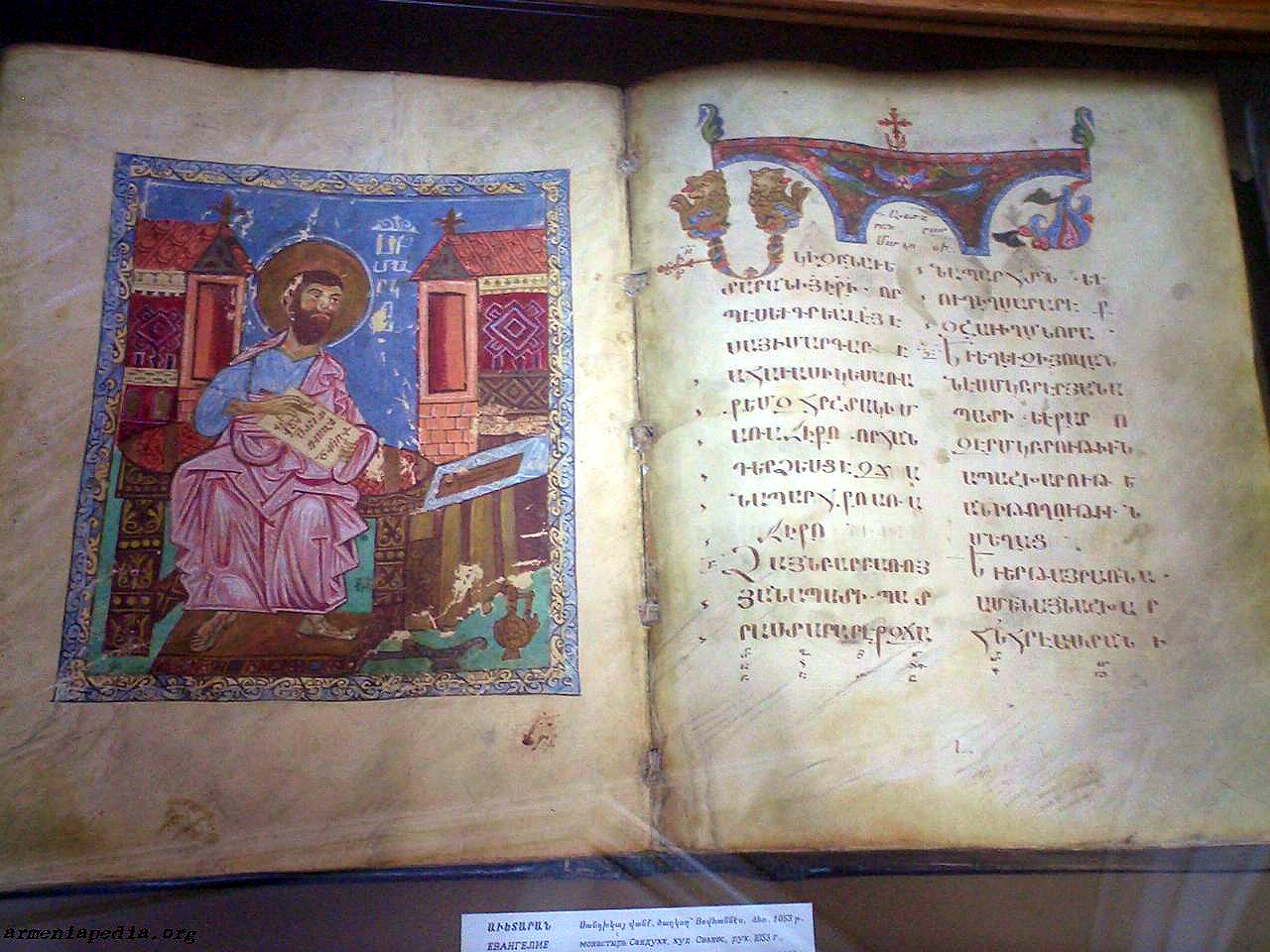
Armenian manuscript of 1053. Work of Johannes

An illuminated manuscript is a manuscript in which the text is supplemented by the addition of decoration. The earliest surviving substantive illuminated manuscripts are from the period AD 400 to 600, primarily produced in Ireland, Constantinople and Italy. The majority of surviving manuscripts are from the Middle Ages, although many illuminated manuscripts survive from the 15th-century Renaissance, along with a very limited number from Late Antiquity.

Most illuminated manuscripts were created as codices, which had superseded scrolls; some isolated single sheets survive. A very few illuminated manuscript fragments survive on papyrus. Most medieval manuscripts, illuminated or not, were written on parchment (most commonly of calf, sheep, or goat skin), but most manuscripts important enough to illuminate were written on the best quality of parchment, called vellum, traditionally made of unsplit calfskin, although high quality parchment from other skins was also called parchment.

=== Iconography ===
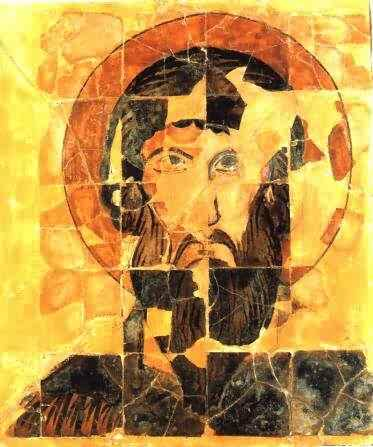
There are few old ceramic icons, such as this St. Theodor icon which dates to ca. 900 (from Preslav, Bulgaria)

Christian art began, about two centuries after Christ, by borrowing motifs from Roman Imperial imagery, classical Greek and Roman religion and popular art. Religious images are used to some extent by the Abrahamic Christian faith, and often contain highly complex iconography, which reflects centuries of accumulated tradition. In the Late Antique period iconography began to be standardised, and to relate more closely to biblical texts, although many gaps in the canonical Gospel narratives were plugged with matter from the apocryphal gospels. Eventually the Church would succeed in weeding most of these out, but some remain, like the ox and ass in the Nativity of Christ.

An icon is a religious work of art, most commonly a painting, from Orthodox Christianity. Christianity has used symbolism from its very beginnings. In both East and West, numerous iconic types of Christ, Mary and saints and other subjects were developed; the number of named types of icons of Mary, with or without the infant Christ, was especially large in the East, whereas Christ Pantocrator was much the commonest image of Christ.

Christian symbolism invests objects or actions with an inner meaning expressing Christian ideas. Christianity has borrowed from the common stock of significant symbols known to most periods and to all regions of the world. Religious symbolism is effective when it appeals to both the intellect and the emotions. Especially important depictions of Mary include the Hodegetria and Panagia types. Traditional models evolved for narrative paintings, including large cycles covering the events of the Life of Christ, the Life of the Virgin, parts of the Old Testament, and, increasingly, the lives of popular saints. Especially in the West, a system of attributes developed for identifying individual figures of saints by a standard appearance and symbolic objects held by them; in the East they were more likely to identified by text labels.

Each saint has a story and a reason why he or she led an exemplary life. Symbols have been used to tell these stories throughout the history of the Church. A number of Christian saints are traditionally represented by a symbol or iconic motif associated with their life, termed an attribute or emblem, in order to identify them. The study of these forms part of iconography in Art history.

=== Eastern Christian art ===
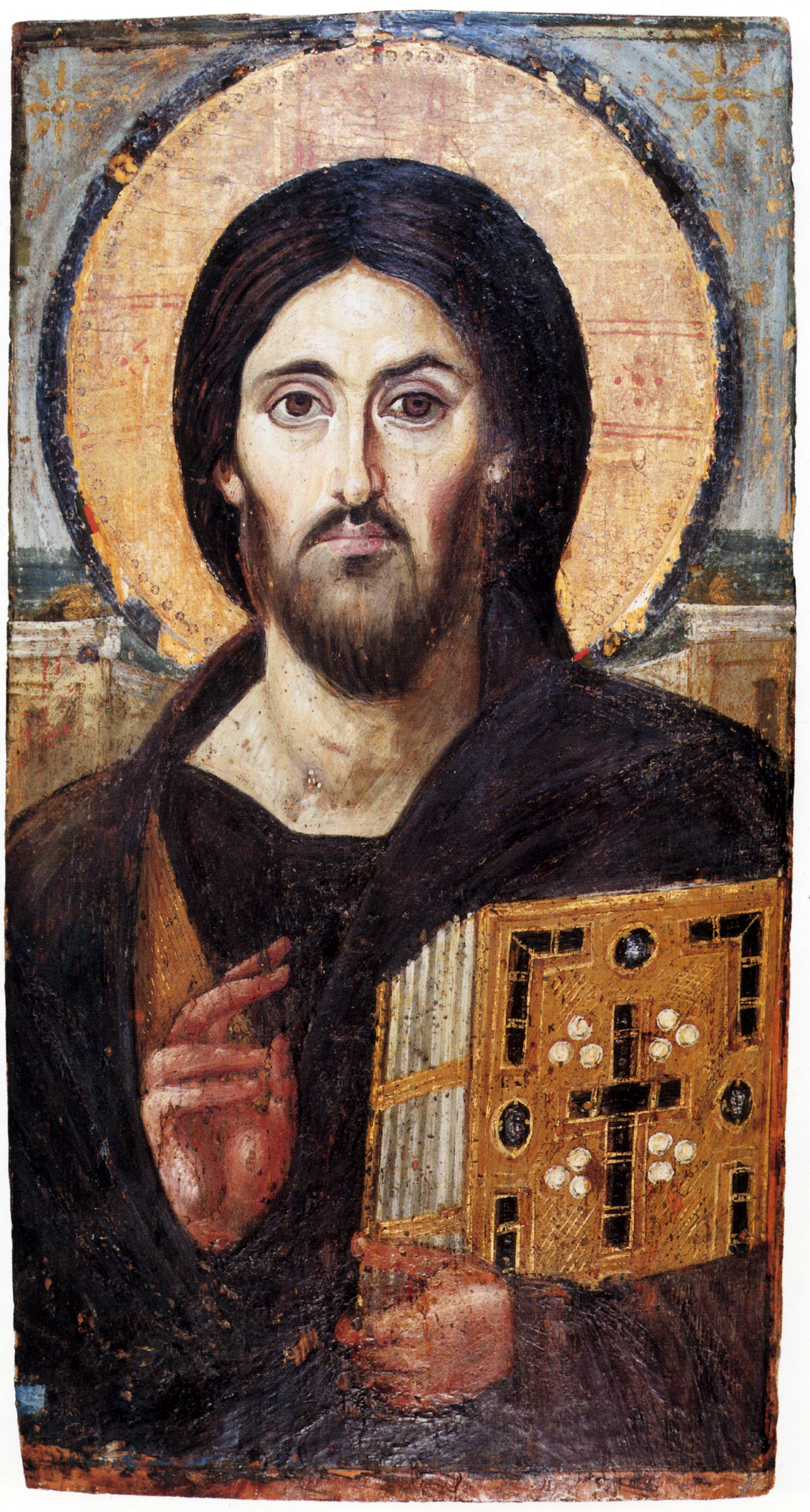
c. 6th-century icon of Christ Pantocrator, a rare pre-Iconoclasm icon.

The dedication of Constantinople as capital in 330 AD created a great new Christian artistic centre for the Eastern Roman Empire, which soon became a separate political unit. Major Constantinopolitan churches built under Constantine and his son, Constantius II, included the original foundations of Hagia Sophia and the Church of the Holy Apostles. As the Western Roman Empire disintegrated and was taken over by "barbarian" peoples, the art of the Byzantine Empire reached levels of sophistication, power and artistry not previously seen in Christian art, and set the standards for those parts of the West still in touch with Constantinople.

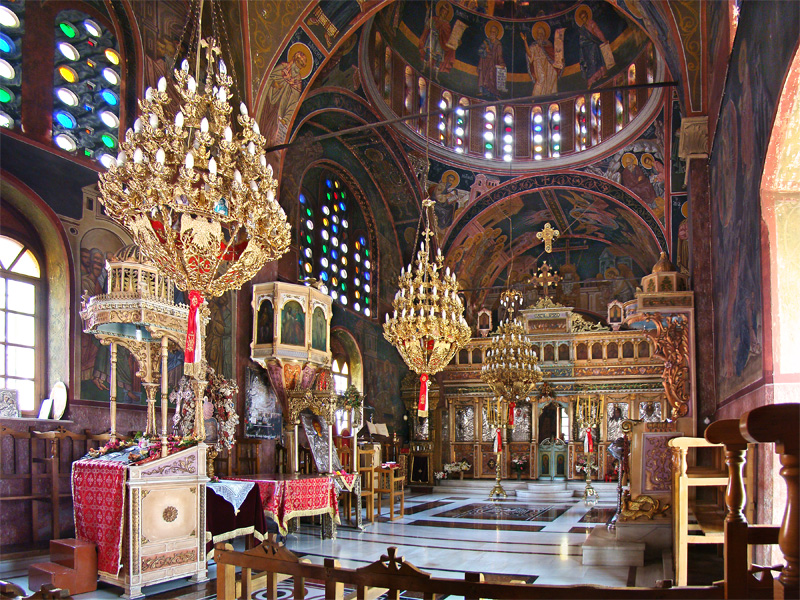
Church of Agios Panteleimonos, Greece

This achievement was checked by the controversy over the use of graven images, and the proper interpretation of the Second Commandment, which led to the crisis of Iconoclasm or destruction of religious images, which racked the Empire between 726 and 843. The restoration of Orthodoxy resulted in a strict standardization of religious imagery within the Eastern Church. Byzantine art became increasingly conservative, as the form of images themselves, many accorded divine origin or thought to have been be painted by Saint Luke or other figures, was held to have a status not far off that of a scriptural text. They could be copied, but not improved upon. As a concession to Iconoclast sentiment, monumental religious sculpture was effectively banned. Neither of these attitudes were held in Western Europe, but Byzantine art nonetheless had great influence there until the High Middle Ages, and remained very popular long after that, with vast numbers of icons of the Cretan School exported to Europe as late as the Renaissance. Where possible, Byzantine artists were borrowed for projects such as mosaics in Venice and Palermo. The enigmatic frescoes at Castelseprio may be an example of work by a Greek artist working in Italy.

The art of Eastern Catholicism has always been rather closer to the Orthodox art of Greece and Russia, and in countries near the Orthodox world, notably Poland, Catholic art has many Orthodox influences. The Black Madonna of Częstochowa may well have been of Byzantine origin – it has been repainted and this is hard to tell. Other images that are certainly of Greek origin, like the Salus Populi Romani and Our Lady of Perpetual Help, both icons in Rome, have been subjects of specific veneration for centuries.

Although the influence has often been resisted, especially in Russia, Catholic art has also affected Orthodox depictions in many respects, especially in countries like Romania, and in the post-Byzantine Cretan School, which led Greek Orthodox art under Venetian rule in the 15th and 16th centuries. El Greco left Crete when relatively young, but Michael Damaskinos returned after a brief period in Venice, and was able to switch between Italian and Greek styles. Even the traditionalist Theophanes the Cretan, working mainly on Mount Athos, nevertheless shows unmistakable Western influence.

Many Eastern Orthodox states in Eastern Europe, as well as to some degree the Muslim states of the eastern Mediterranean, preserved many aspects of the empire's culture and art for centuries afterward. A number of states contemporary with the Byzantine Empire were culturally influenced by it, without actually being part of it (the "Byzantine commonwealth"). These included Bulgaria, Serbia, and Kievan Rus', as well as some non-Orthodox states like the Republic of Venice and the Kingdom of Sicily, which had close ties to the Byzantine Empire despite being in other respects part of western European culture. Art produced by Eastern Orthodox Christians living in the Ottoman Empire is often called "post-Byzantine". Certain artistic traditions that originated in the Byzantine Empire, particularly in regard to icon painting and church architecture, are maintained in Greece, Serbia, Bulgaria, Macedonia, Russia and other Eastern Orthodox countries to the present day.

=== Catholic art ===
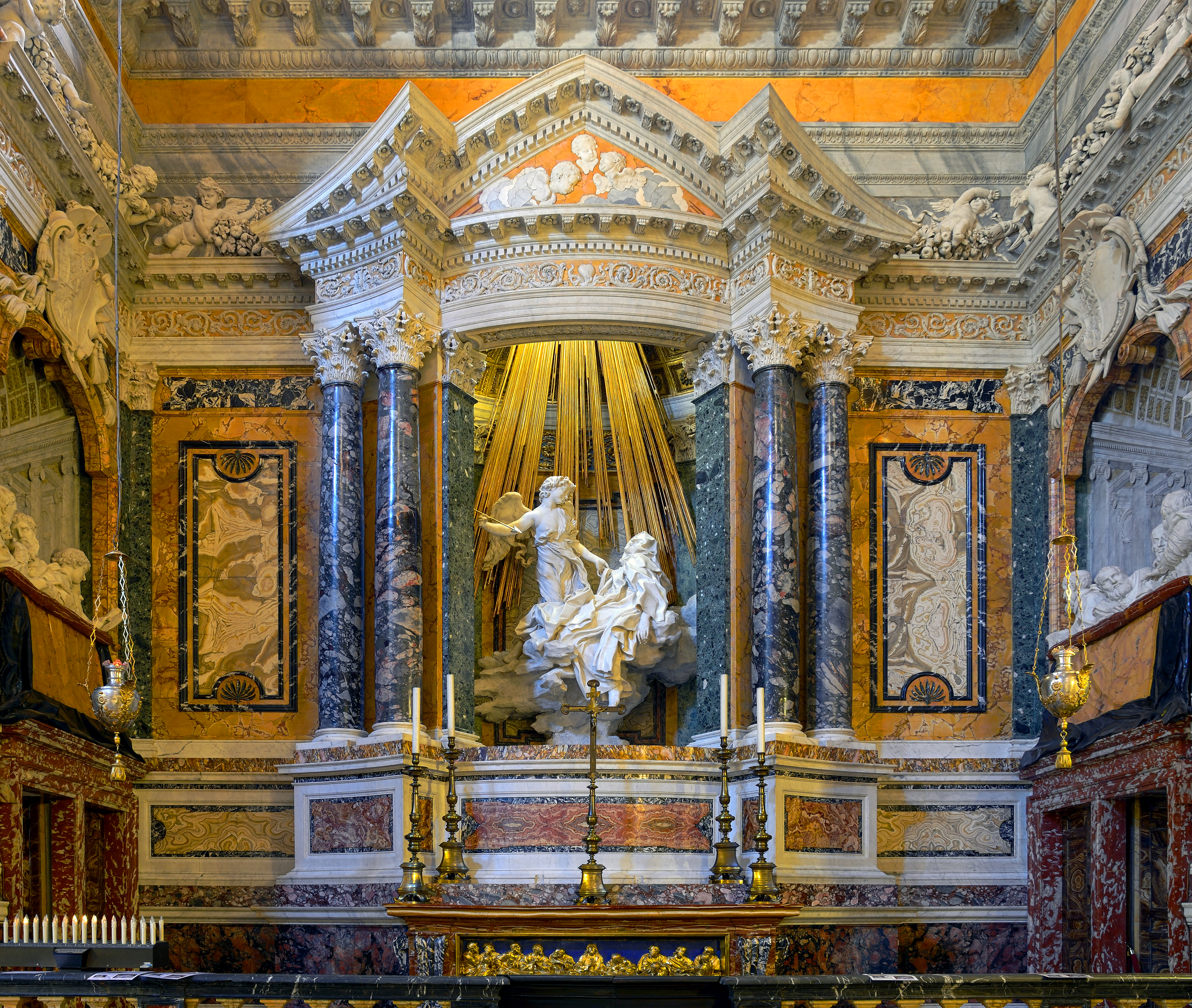
Bernini's Ecstasy of Saint Theresa

Roman Catholic art consists of all visual works produced in an attempt to illustrate, supplement and portray in tangible form the teachings of the Catholic Church. This includes sculpture, painting, mosaics, metalwork, embroidery and even architecture. Catholic art has played a leading role in the history and development of Western art since at least the 4th century. The principal subject matter of Catholic art has been the life and times of Jesus Christ, along with those of his disciples, the saints, and the events of the Jewish Old Testament.

The earliest surviving art works are the painted frescoes on the walls of the catacombs and meeting houses of the persecuted Christians of the Roman Empire. The Christian Church in Rome was influenced by the Roman style of art and the religious Christian artists of the time. The stone sarcophagi of Roman Christians exhibit the earliest surviving carved statuary of Jesus, Mary and other biblical figures. The legalisation of Christianity transformed Catholic art, which adopted richer forms such as mosaics and illuminated manuscripts. The iconoclasm controversy briefly divided the eastern and western churches, after which artistic development progressed in separate directions. Romanesque and Gothic art flowered in the Western Church as the style of painting and statuary moved in an increasingly naturalistic direction. The Protestant Reformation produced new waves of image-destruction, to which the Church responded with the dramatic and emotive Baroque and Rococo styles. In the 19th century the leadership in western art moved away from the Catholic Church which, after embracing historical revivalism was increasingly affected by the modernist movement, a movement that in its "rebellion" against nature, counters the Church's emphasis on nature as a good creation of God.

Renaissance artists such as Raphael, Michelangelo, Leonardo da Vinci, Bernini, Botticelli, Fra Angelico, Tintoretto, Caravaggio, and Titian, were among a multitude of innovative virtuosos sponsored by the Church.

British art historian Kenneth Clark wrote that Western Europe's first "great age of civilisation" was ready to begin around the year 1000. From 1100, he wrote, monumental abbeys and cathedrals were constructed and decorated with sculptures, hangings, mosaics and works belonging one of the greatest epochs of art and providing stark contrast to the monotonous and cramped conditions of ordinary living during the period. Abbot Suger of the Abbey of St. Denis is considered an influential early patron of Gothic architecture and believed that love of beauty brought people closer to God: "The dull mind rises to truth through that which is material". Clarke calls this "the intellectual background of all the sublime works of art of the next century and in fact has remained the basis of our belief of the value of art until today".

Later, during the Renaissance and Counter-Reformation, Catholic artists produced many of the unsurpassed masterpieces of Western art – often inspired by biblical themes: from Michelangelo's Moses and David and Pietà sculptures, to Da Vinci's Last Supper and Raphael's various Madonna paintings. Referring to a "great outburst of creative energy such as took place in Rome between 1620 and 1660", Kenneth Clarke wrote:

=== Protestant art ===
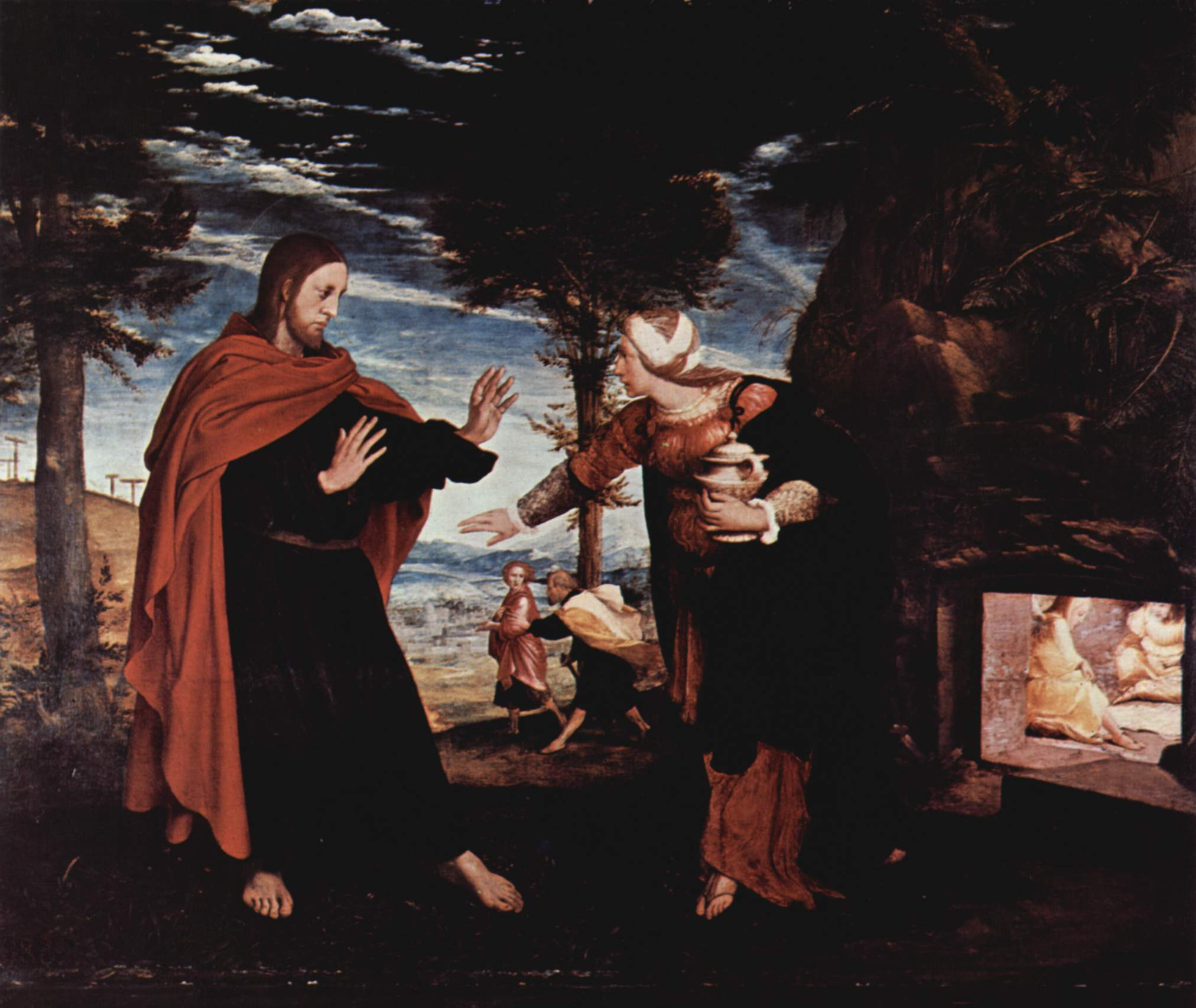
Hans Holbein the Younger's Noli me tangere a relatively rare Protestant oil painting of Christ from the Reformation period. It is small, and generally naturalistic in style, avoiding iconic elements like the halo, which is barely discernible.

The Protestant Reformation during the 16th century in Europe almost entirely rejected the existing tradition of Catholic art, and very often destroyed as much of it as it could reach. A new artistic tradition developed, producing far smaller quantities of art that followed Protestant agendas and diverged drastically from the southern European tradition and the humanist art produced during the High Renaissance. In turn, the Catholic Counter-Reformation both reacted against and responded to Protestant criticisms of art in Roman Catholicism to produce a more stringent style of Catholic art. Protestant religious art both embraced Protestant values and assisted in the proliferation of Protestantism, but the amount of religious art produced in Protestant countries was hugely reduced. Artists in Protestant countries diversified into secular forms of art like history painting, landscape painting, portrait painting and still life.

Prominent painters with Protestant background were, for example, Albrecht Dürer, Hans Holbein the Younger, Lucas Cranach, Rembrandt, and Vincent van Gogh. World literature was enriched by the works of Edmund Spenser, John Milton, John Bunyan, John Donne, John Dryden, Daniel Defoe, William Wordsworth, Jonathan Swift, Johann Wolfgang Goethe, Friedrich Schiller, Samuel Taylor Coleridge, Edgar Allan Poe, Matthew Arnold, Conrad Ferdinand Meyer, Theodor Fontane, Washington Irving, Robert Browning, Emily Dickinson, Emily Brontë, Charles Dickens, Nathaniel Hawthorne, Thomas Stearns Eliot, John Galsworthy, Thomas Mann, William Faulkner, John Updike, and many others.

== Education ==
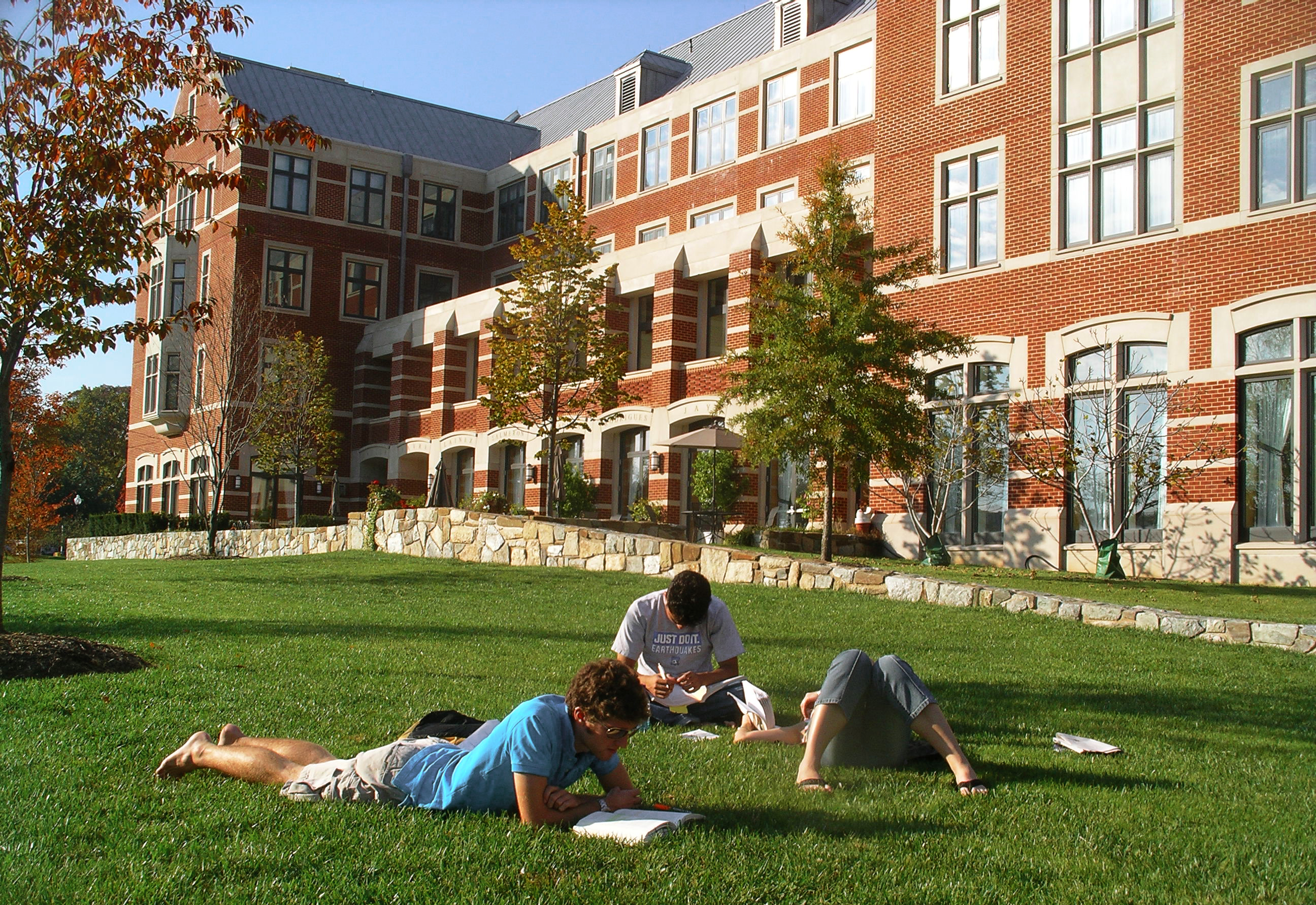
Students studying outside Wolfington Hall Jesuit Residence in Georgetown University

The university is generally regarded as an institution that has its origin in the Medieval Christian setting. Prior to the establishment of universities, European higher education took place for hundreds of years in Christian cathedral schools or monastic schools (Scholae monasticae), in which monks and nuns taught classes; evidence of these immediate forerunners of the later university at many places dates back to the 6th century AD.

Missionary activity for the Catholic Church has always incorporated education of evangelized peoples as part of its social ministry. History shows that in evangelized lands, the first people to operate schools were Roman Catholics. In some countries, the Church is the main provider of education or significantly supplements government forms of education. Presently, the Church operates the world's largest non-governmental school system. Many of Western Civilization's most influential universities were founded by the Catholic Church.

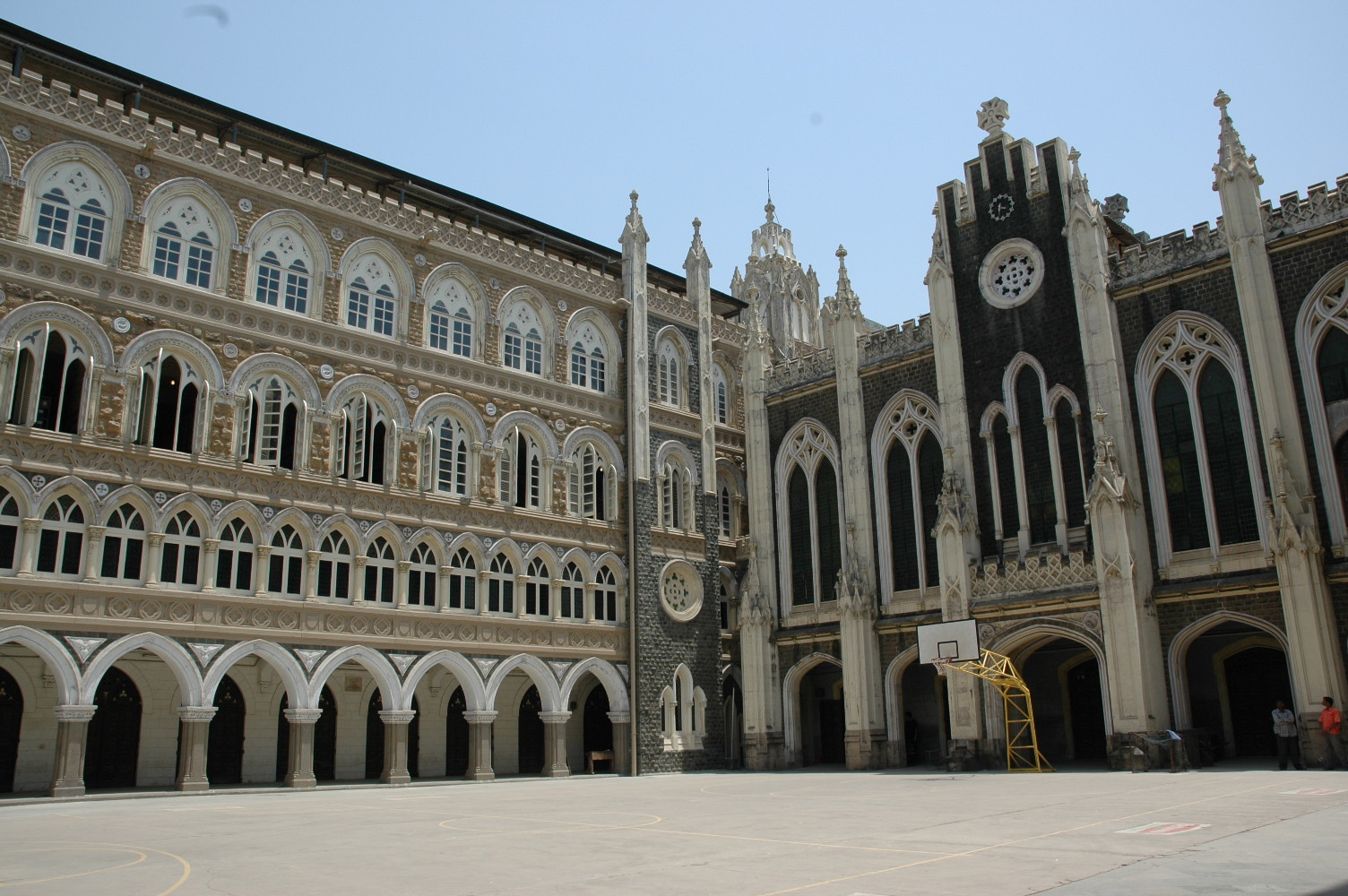
The Catholic St. Xavier's College in Mumbai, is one of the most prestigious liberal arts colleges in India

The Catholic Church founded the West's first universities, which were preceded by the schools attached to monasteries and cathedrals, and generally staffed by monks and friars. Universities began springing up in Italian towns like Salerno, which became a leading medical school, translating the work of Greek and Arabic physicians into Latin. Bologna University became the most influential of the early universities, which first specialised in canon law and civil law. Paris University, specialising in such topics as theology, came to rival Bologna under the supervision of Notre Dame Cathedral. Oxford University in England later came rival Paris in Theology and Salamanca University was founded in Spain in 1243. According to the historian Geoffrey Blainey, the universities benefitted from the use of Latin, the common language of the Church, and its internationalist reach, and their role was to "teach, argue and reason within a Christian framework". The medieval universities of Western Christendom were well-integrated across all of Western Europe, encouraged freedom of enquiry and produced a great variety of fine scholars and natural philosophers, including Robert Grosseteste of the University of Oxford, an early expositor of a systematic method of scientific experimentation; and Saint Albert the Great, a pioneer of biological field research The Catholic church has always been involved in education, since the founding of the first universities of Europe. It runs and sponsors thousands of primary and secondary schools, colleges and universities throughout the world.

As the Reformers wanted all members of the church to be able to read the Bible, education on all levels got a strong boost. Compulsory education for both boys and girls was introduced. For example, the Puritans who established Massachusetts Bay Colony in 1628 founded Harvard College only eight years later. About a dozen other colleges followed in the 18th century, including Yale University (1701). Pennsylvania also became a centre of learning. While Princeton University was a Presbyterian foundation. Protestantism also initiated translations of the Bible into national languages and hereby supported the development of national literatures.

A large number of mainline Protestants have played leadership roles in many aspects of American life, including politics, business, science, the arts, and education. They founded most of the country's leading institutes of higher education. The Ivy League universities have strong White Anglo-Saxon Protestant historical ties, and their influence continues today. Until about World War II, Ivy League universities were composed largely of WASP students.

Some of the first colleges and universities in America, including Harvard, Yale, Princeton, Columbia, Dartmouth, Williams, Bowdoin, Middlebury, and Amherst, all were founded by the Mainline Protestantism, as were later Carleton, Duke, Oberlin, Beloit, Pomona, Rollins and Colorado College.

According to Pew Center study there is correlation between education and income, about (59%) of American Anglican have a graduate and post-graduate degree, and about (56%) of Episcopalians and (47%) of Presbyterians and (46%) United Church of Christ, have a graduate and post-graduate degree.

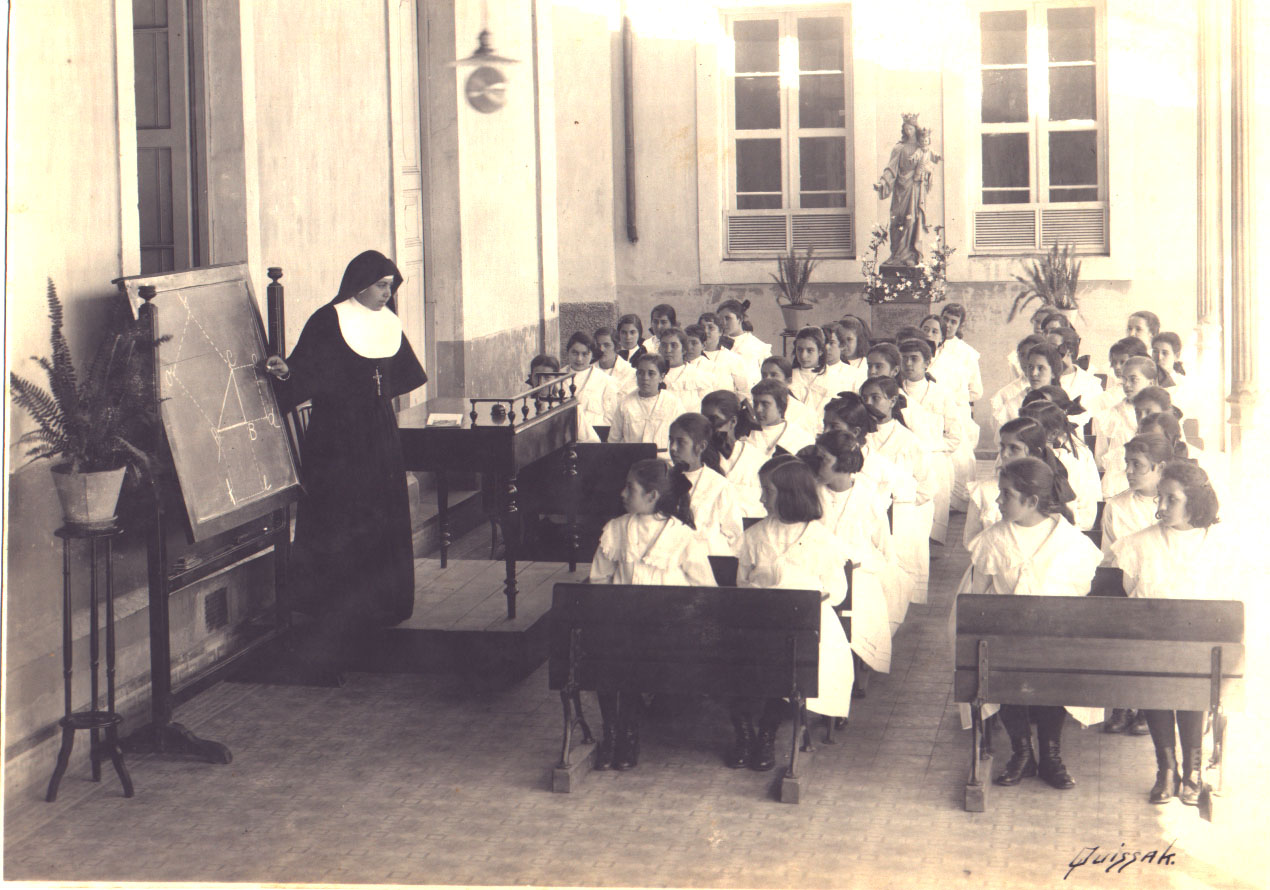
A Catholic nun teach Mathematics in Santa Inês College in São Paulo in the year 1917.

A Pew Center study about religion and education around the world in 2016, found that Christians ranked as the second most educated religious group around in the world after Jews with an average of 9.3 years of schooling, and the highest of years of schooling among Christians found in Germany (13.6), New Zealand (13.5) and Estonia (13.1). Christians were also found to have the second highest number of graduate and post-graduate degrees per capita while in absolute numbers ranked in the first place (220 million). Between the various Christian communities, Singapore outranks other nations in terms of Christians who obtain a university degree in institutions of higher education (67%), followed by the Christians of Israel (63%), and the Christians of Georgia (57%). According to the study, Christians in North America, Europe, Middle East, North Africa and Asia-Pacific regions are highly educated since many of the world universities were built by the historic Christian Churches, in addition to the historical evidence that "Christian monks built libraries and, in the days before printing presses, preserved important earlier writings produced in Latin, Greek and Arabic". According to the same study, Christians have a significant amount of gender equality in educational attainment, and the study suggests that one of the reasons is the encouragement of the Protestant Reformers in promoting the education of women, which led to the eradication of illiteracy among females in Protestant communities. According to the same study "there is a large and pervasive gap in educational attainment between Muslims and Christians in sub-Saharan Africa" as Muslim adults in this region are far less educated than their Christian counterparts, with scholars suggesting that this gap is due to the educational facilities that were created by Christian missionaries during the colonial era for fellow believers.

== Literature and poetry ==
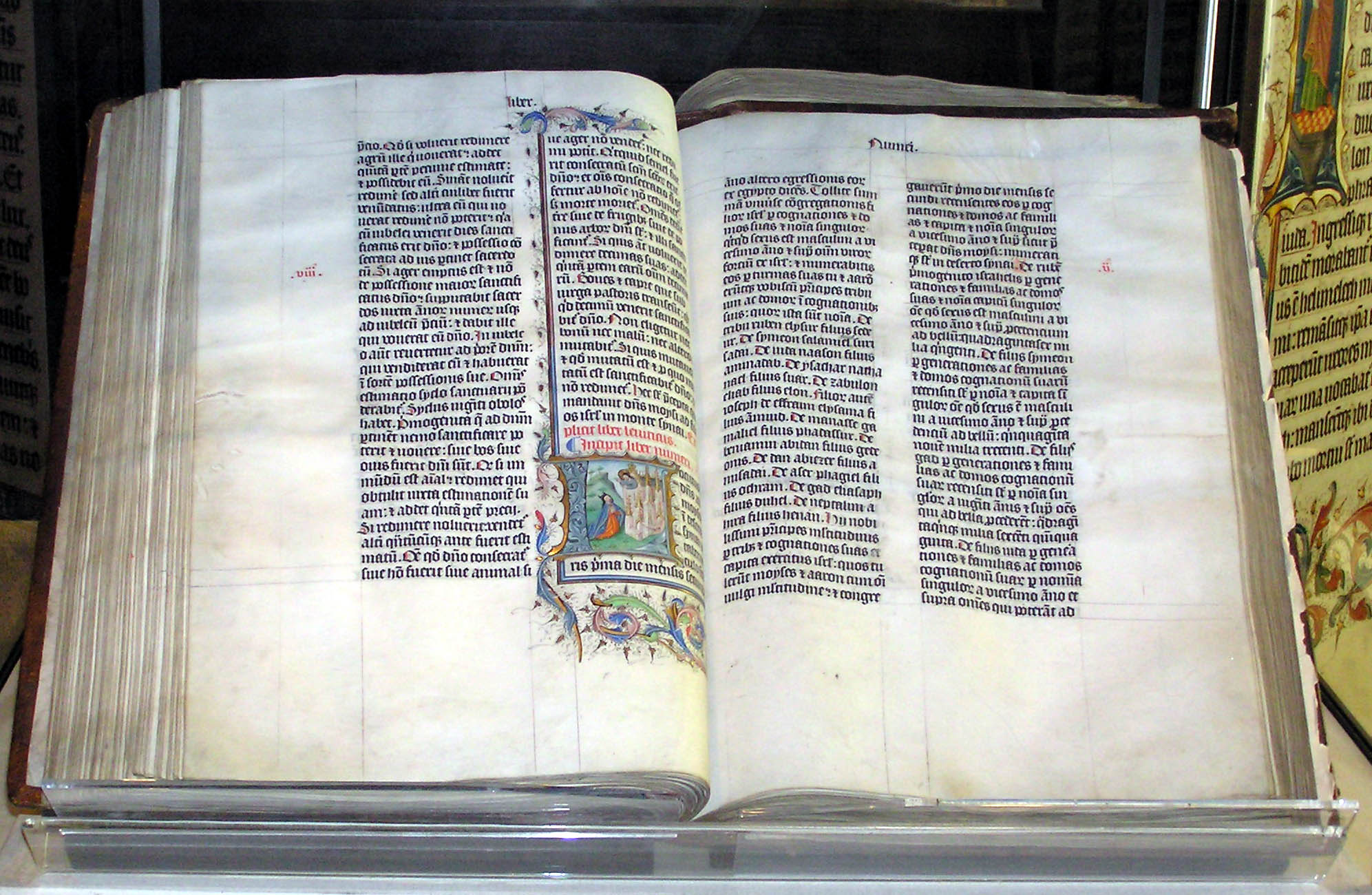
Gutenberg Bible. The Bible was authored by Jews during the Iron Ages and the Classical era. It comprise cultural values, basic human values, mythology and religious beliefs of both Judaism and Christianity.

Christian literature is writing that deals with Christian themes and incorporates the Christian world view. This constitutes a huge body of extremely varied writing. Christian poetry is any poetry that contains Christian teachings, themes, or references. The influence of Christianity on poetry has been great in any area that Christianity has taken hold. Christian poems often directly reference the Bible, while others provide allegory.

While falling within the strict definition of literature, the Bible is not generally considered literature. However, the Bible has been treated and appreciated as literature; the Bible is a corner stone of Western civilization. The King James Version in particular has long been considered a masterpiece of English prose, whatever may be thought of its religious significance. The Authorized Version has been called "the most influential version of the most influential book in the world, in what is now its most influential language", "the most important book in English religion and culture", and "the most celebrated book in the English-speaking world". David Crystal has estimated that it is responsible for 257 idioms in English, examples include feet of clay and reap the whirlwind. Furthermore, prominent atheist figures such as the late Christopher Hitchens and Richard Dawkins have praised the King James Version as being "a giant step in the maturing of English literature" and "a great work of literature", respectively, with Dawkins then adding, "A native speaker of English who has never read a word of the King James Bible is verging on the barbarian". Several retellings of the Bible, or parts of the Bible, have also been made with the aim of emphasising its literary qualities. With estimated sales of over 5 billion copies, the Bible is widely considered to be the best-selling book of all time. It sells approximately 100 million copies annually, and has been a major influence on literature and history, especially in the West, where the Gutenberg Bible was the first book printed using movable type.

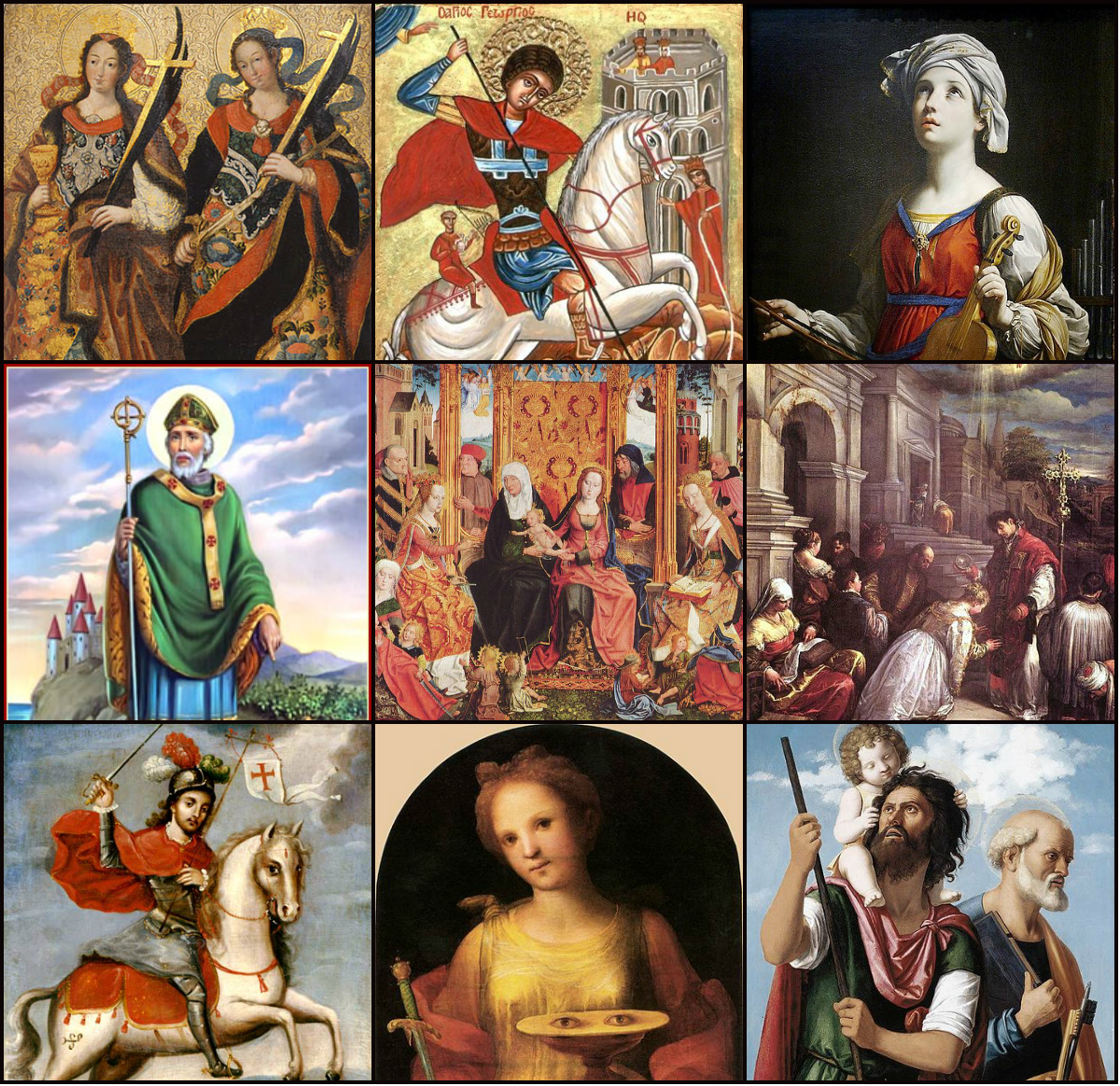
The stories of the saints which are preserved in the Golden Legend

In Byzantine literature, four different cultural elements are recognised: the Greek, the Christian, the Roman, and the Oriental. Byzantine literature is often classified in five groups: historians and annalists, encyclopaedists (Patriarch Photios, Michael Psellus, and Michael Choniates are regarded as the greatest encyclopaedists of Byzantium) and essayists, and writers of secular poetry. The only genuine heroic epic of the Byzantines is the Digenis Acritas. The remaining two groups include the new literary species: ecclesiastical and theological literature, and popular poetry. And it was in Alexandria that Graeco-Oriental Christianity had its birth. There the Septuagint translation had been made; there that that fusion of Greek philosophy and Jewish religion took place which culminated in Philo; there flourished the mystic speculative Neoplatonism associated with Plotinus and Porphyry. At Alexandria the great Greek ecclesiastical writers worked alongside pagan rhetoricians and philosophers; several were born here, e.g. Origen, Athanasius, and his opponent Arius, also Cyril and Synesius. On Egyptian soil monasticism began and thrived. After Alexandria, Antioch held great prestige, where a school of Christian commentators flourished under St. John Chrysostom and where later arose the Christian universal chronicles. In surrounding Syria, we find the germs of Greek ecclesiastical poetry, while from neighboring Palestine came St. John of Damascus, one of the Greek Fathers.

The list of Catholic authors and literary works is vast. With a literary tradition spanning two millennia, the Bible and Papal Encyclicals have been constants of the Catholic canon but countless other historical works may be listed as noteworthy in terms of their influence on Western society. From late Antiquity, St Augustine's book Confessions, which outlines his sinful youth and conversion to Christianity, is widely considered to be the first autobiography of ever written in the canon of Western Literature. Augustine profoundly influenced the coming medieval worldview. The Summa Theologica, written 1265–1274, is the best-known work of Thomas Aquinas (c.1225–1274), and although unfinished, "one of the classics of the history of philosophy and one of the most influential works of Western literature." It is intended as a manual for beginners in theology and a compendium of all of the main theological teachings of the Church. It presents the reasoning for almost all points of Christian theology in the West. The epic poetry of the Italian Dante and his Divine Comedy of the late Middle Ages is also considered immensely influential. The English statesman and philosopher, Thomas More, wrote the seminal work Utopia in 1516. St Ignatius Loyola, a key figure in the Catholic counter-reformation, is the author of an influential book of meditations known as the Spiritual Exercises.

== Medicine and health care ==
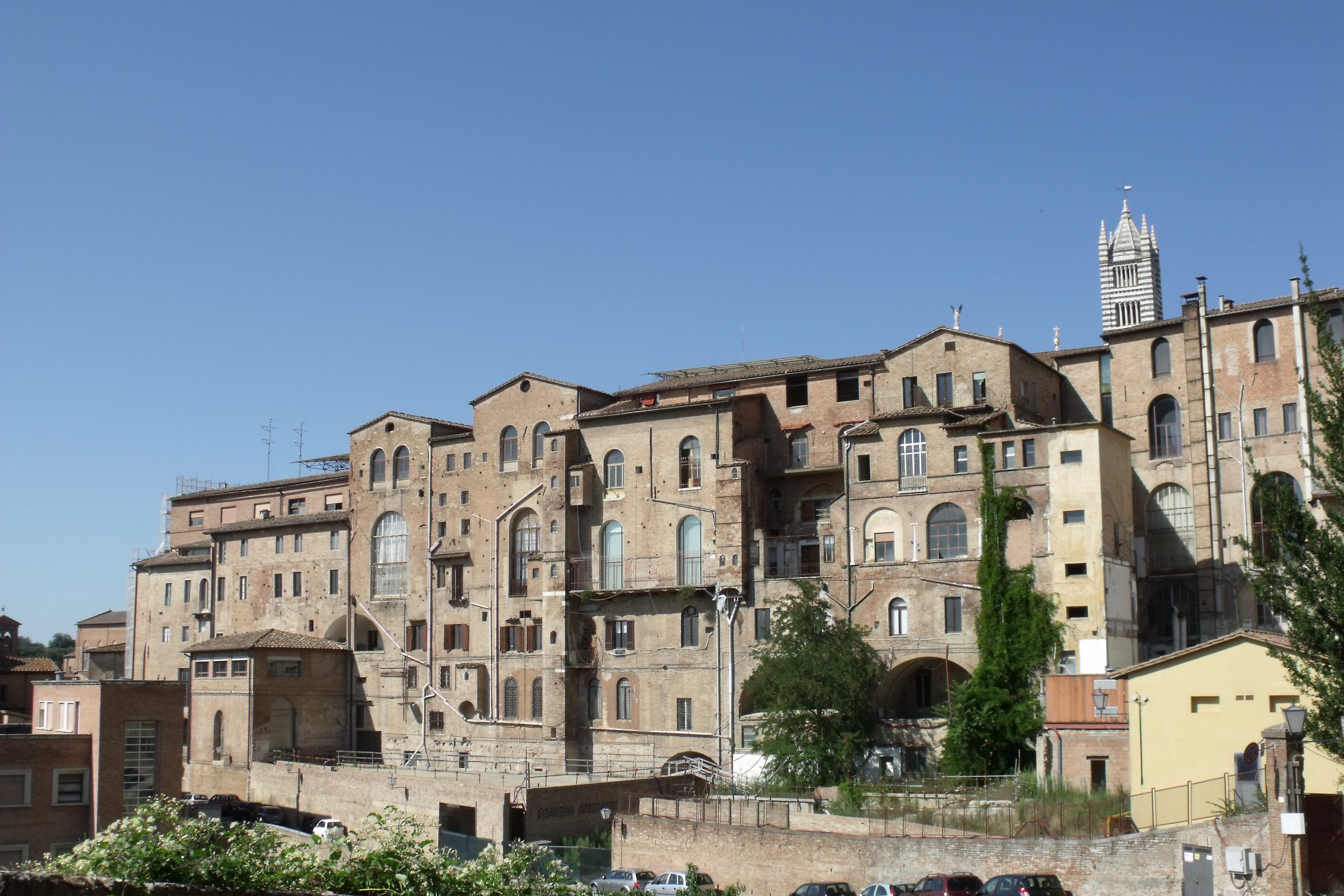
Panorama of Siena's Santa Maria della Scala Hospital, one of Europe's oldest hospitals

The administration of the Eastern and Western Roman Empires split and the demise of the Western Empire by the 6th century was accompanied by a series of violent invasions and precipitated the collapse of cities and civic institutions of learning, along with their links to the learning of classical Greece and Rome. For the next thousand years, medical knowledge would change very little. A scholarly medical tradition maintained itself in the more stable East, but in the West, scholarship virtually disappeared outside of the Church, where monks were aware of a dwindling range of medical texts. Hospitality was considered an obligation of Christian charity and bishops' houses and the valetudinaria of wealthier Christians were used to tend the sick. And the legacy of this early period was, in the words of Porter, that "Christianity planted the hospital: the well-endowed establishments of the Levant and the scattered houses of the West shared a common religious ethos of charity."

The Byzantine Empire was one of the first empires to have flourishing medical establishments. Prior to the Byzantine Empire the Roman Empire had hospitals specifically for soldiers and slaves. However, none of these establishments were for the public. The hospitals in Byzantium were originally started by the church to act as a place for the poor to have access to basic amenities. Hospitals were usually separated between men and women. Although the remains of these hospitals have not been discovered by archaeologists, recordings of hospitals from the Byzantine Empire describe large buildings that had the core feature of an open hearth. The establishments of the Byzantine Empire resembled the beginning of what we now know as modern hospitals. The first hospital was erected by Leontius of Antioch between the years 344 to 358 and was a place for strangers and migrants to find refuge. Around the same time, a deacon named Marathonius was in charge of hospitals and monasteries in Constantinople. His main objective was to improve urban aesthetics, illustrating hospitals as a main part of Byzantine cities. These early hospitals were designed for the poor. In fact, most hospitals throughout the Byzantine Empire were almost exclusively utilized by the poor. This may be due to descriptions of hospitals similar to "Gregory Nazianzen who called the hospital a stairway to heaven, implying that it aimed only to ease death for the chronically or terminally ill rather than promote recovery". There is debate between scholars as to why these institutions were started by the church. Many scholars believe that the church founded hospitals in order to receive additional donations. Whatever the case for these hospitals, they began to diffuse across the empire. Soon after, St. Basil of Caesarea developed a place for the sick in which provided refuge for the sick and homeless.

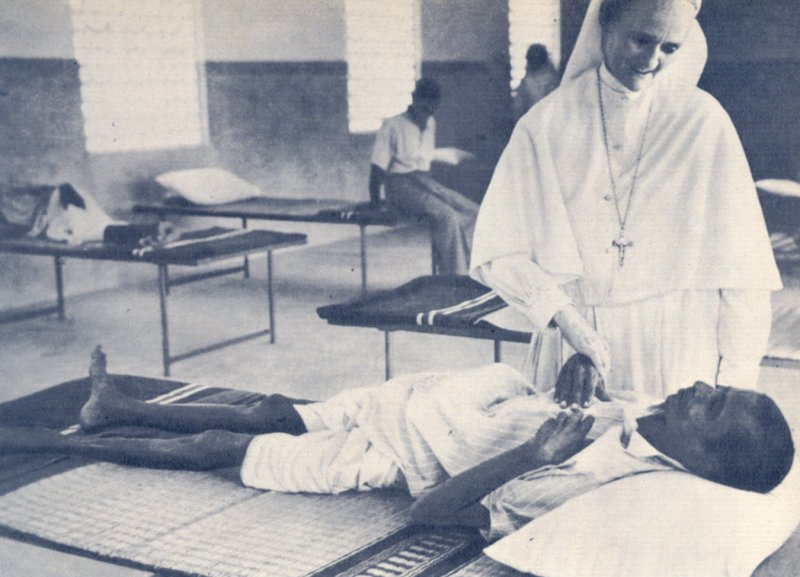
Salesian sister caring for sick and poor in former Madras Presidency. Catholic women have been heavily involved as care givers

Geoffrey Blainey likened the Catholic Church in its activities during the Middle Ages to an early version of a welfare state: "It conducted hospitals for the old and orphanages for the young; hospices for the sick of all ages; places for the lepers; and hostels or inns where pilgrims could buy a cheap bed and meal". It supplied food to the population during famine and distributed food to the poor. This welfare system the church funded through collecting taxes on a large scale and possessing large farmlands and estates. It was common for monks and clerics to practice medicine and medical students in northern European universities often took minor Holy orders. Mediaeval hospitals had a strongly Christian ethos, and were, in the words of historian of medicine Roy Porter, "religious foundations through and through", and Ecclesiastical regulations were passed to govern medicine, partly to prevent clergymen profiting from medicine. During Europe's Age of Discovery, Catholic missionaries, notably the Jesuits, introduced the modern sciences to India, China and Japan. While persecutions continue to limit the spread of Catholic institutions to some Middle Eastern Muslim nations, and such places as the People's Republic of China and North Korea, elsewhere in Asia the church is a major provider of health care services - especially in Catholic Nations like the Philippines.

Today the Roman Catholic Church is the largest non-government provider of health care services in the world. It has around 18,000 clinics, 16,000 homes for the elderly and those with special needs, and 5,500 hospitals, with 65 percent of them located in developing countries. In 2010, the Church's Pontifical Council for the Pastoral Care of Health Care Workers said that the Church manages 26% of the world's health care facilities. The Church's involvement in health care has ancient origins.

== Music ==
Christian music is music that has been written to express either personal or a communal belief regarding Christian life and faith. Common themes of Christian music include praise, worship, penitence, and lament, and its forms vary widely across the world.

Like other forms of music the creation, performance, significance, and even the definition of Christian music varies according to culture and social context. Christian music is composed and performed for many purposes, ranging from aesthetic pleasure, religious or ceremonial purposes, or as an entertainment product for the marketplace.

In music, Catholic monks developed the first forms of modern Western musical notation in order to standardize liturgy throughout the worldwide Church, and an enormous body of religious music has been composed for it through the ages. This led directly to the emergence and development of European classical music, and its many derivatives. The Baroque style, which encompassed music, art, and architecture, was particularly encouraged by the post-Reformation Catholic Church as such forms offered a means of religious expression that was stirring and emotional, intended to stimulate religious fervor.

The list of Catholic composers and Catholic sacred music which have a prominent place in Western culture is extensive, but includes Wolfgang Amadeus Mozart's Ave verum corpus; Franz Schubert's Ave Maria, César Franck's Panis angelicus, and Antonio Vivaldi's Gloria.

Martin Luther, Paul Gerhardt, George Wither, Isaac Watts, Charles Wesley, William Cowper, and many other authors and composers created well-known church hymns. Musicians like Heinrich Schütz, Johann Sebastian Bach, George Frederick Handel, Henry Purcell, Johannes Brahms, and Felix Mendelssohn-Bartholdy composed great works of music.

== Philosophy ==
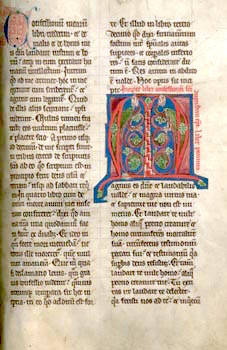
Confessions by St. Augustine of Hippo

Christian philosophy is a term to describe the fusion of various fields of philosophy with the theological doctrines of Christianity. Scholasticism, which means "that [which] belongs to the school", and was a method of learning taught by the academics (or school people) of medieval universities c. 1100–1500. Scholasticism originally started to reconcile the philosophy of the ancient classical philosophers with medieval Christian theology. Scholasticism is not a philosophy or theology in itself but a tool and method for learning which places emphasis on dialectical reasoning.

Medieval philosophy is the philosophy of Western Europe and the Middle East during the Middle Ages, roughly extending from the Christianization of the Roman Empire until the Renaissance. Medieval philosophy is defined partly by the rediscovery and further development of classical Greek and Hellenistic philosophy, and partly by the need to address theological problems and to integrate the then widespread sacred doctrines of Abrahamic religion (Islam, Judaism, and Christianity) with secular learning.

The history of western European medieval philosophy is traditionally divided into two main periods: the period in the Latin West following the Early Middle Ages until the 12th century, when the works of Aristotle and Plato were preserved and cultivated; and the "golden age" of the 12th, 13th and 14th centuries in the Latin West, which witnessed the culmination of the recovery of ancient philosophy, and significant developments in the field of philosophy of religion, logic and metaphysics.

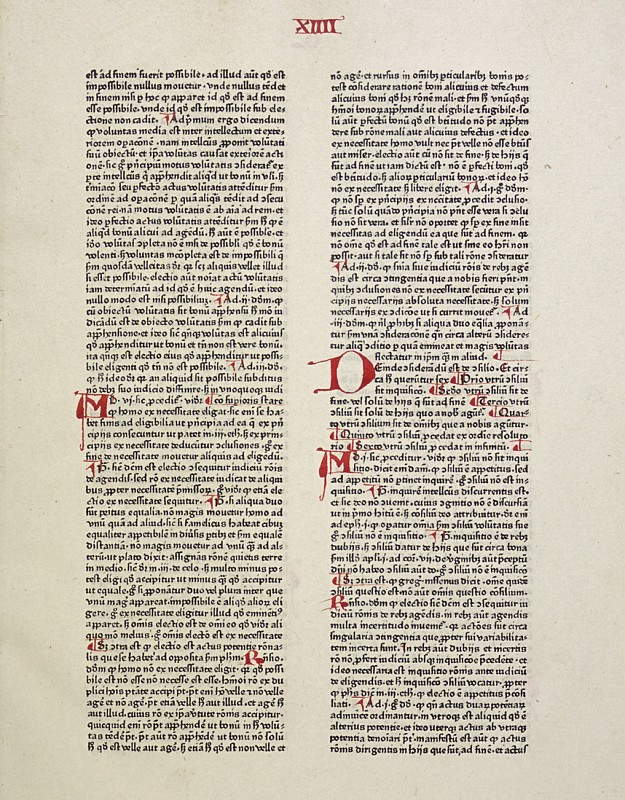
Summa theologica, Pars secunda, prima pars. (copy by Peter Schöffer, 1471)

The medieval era was disparagingly treated by the Renaissance humanists, who saw it as a barbaric "middle" period between the classical age of Greek and Roman culture, and the "rebirth" or renaissance of classical culture. Yet this period of nearly a thousand years was the longest period of philosophical development in Europe, and possibly the richest. Jorge Gracia has argued that "in intensity, sophistication, and achievement, the philosophical flowering in the thirteenth century could be rightly said to rival the golden age of Greek philosophy in the fourth century B.C."

Some problems discussed throughout this period are the relation of faith to reason, the existence and unity of God, the object of theology and metaphysics, the problems of knowledge, of universals, and of individuation.

The medieval tradition of Scholasticism continued to flourish as late as the 17th century, in figures such as Francisco Suarez and John of St. Thomas. Aquinas, father of Thomism, was immensely influential in Catholic Europe, placed a great emphasis on reason and argumentation, and was one of the first to use the new translation of Aristotle's metaphysical and epistemological writing. His work was a significant departure from the Neoplatonic and Augustinian thinking that had dominated much of early Scholasticism.

The Renaissance ("rebirth") was a period of transition between the Middle Ages and modern thought, in which the recovery of classical texts helped shift philosophical interests away from technical studies in logic, metaphysics, and theology towards eclectic inquiries into morality, philology, and mysticism. The study of the classics and the humane arts generally, such as history and literature, enjoyed a scholarly interest hitherto unknown in Christendom, a tendency referred to as humanism. Displacing the medieval interest in metaphysics and logic, the humanists followed Petrarch in making man and his virtues the focus of philosophy.

These new movements in philosophy developed contemporaneously with larger religious and political transformations in Europe: the Reformation and the decline of feudalism. Though the theologians of the Protestant Reformation showed little direct interest in philosophy, their destruction of the traditional foundations of theological and intellectual authority harmonized with a revival of fideism and skepticism in thinkers such as Erasmus, Montaigne, and Francisco Sanches. Meanwhile, the gradual centralization of political power in nation-states was echoed by the emergence of secular political philosophies, as in the works of Niccolò Machiavelli (often described as the first modern political thinker, or a key turning point towards modern political thinking), Thomas More, Erasmus, Justus Lipsius, Jean Bodin, and Hugo Grotius.

== Science and technology ==
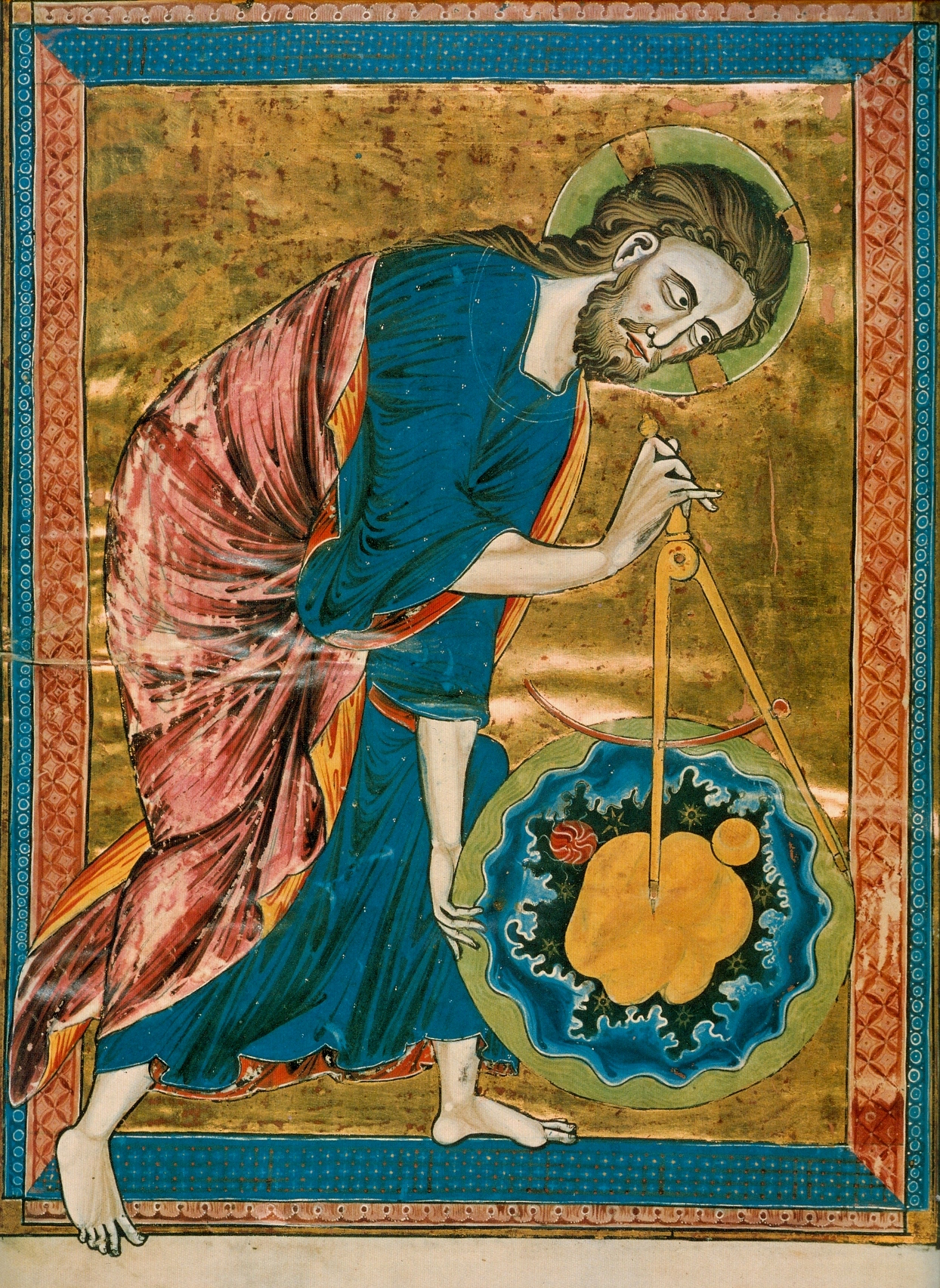
Science, and particularly geometry and astronomy, was linked directly to the divine for most medieval scholars. The compass in this 13th-century manuscript is a symbol of creation.

Earlier attempts at reconciliation of Christianity with Newtonian mechanics appear quite different from later attempts at reconciliation with the newer scientific ideas of evolution or relativity. Many early interpretations of evolution polarized themselves around a struggle for existence. These ideas were significantly countered by later findings of universal patterns of biological cooperation. According to John Habgood, all man really knows here is that the universe seems to be a mix of good and evil, beauty and pain, and that suffering may somehow be part of the process of creation. Habgood holds that Christians should not be surprised that suffering may be used creatively by God, given their faith in the symbol of the Cross. Robert John Russell has examined consonance and dissonance between modern physics, evolutionary biology, and Christian theology.

Christian philosophers Augustine of Hippo (354–430) and Thomas Aquinas held that scriptures can have multiple interpretations on certain areas where the matters were far beyond their reach, therefore one should leave room for future findings to shed light on the meanings. The "Handmaiden" tradition, which saw secular studies of the universe as a very important and helpful part of arriving at a better understanding of scripture, was adopted throughout Christian history from early on. Also the sense that God created the world as a self operating system is what motivated many Christians throughout the Middle Ages to investigate nature.

Modern historians of science such as J.L. Heilbron, Alistair Cameron Crombie, David Lindberg, Edward Grant, Thomas Goldstein, and Ted Davis have reviewed the popular notion that medieval Christianity was a negative influence in the development of civilization and science. In their views, not only did the monks save and cultivate the remnants of ancient civilization during the barbarian invasions, but the medieval church promoted learning and science through its sponsorship of many universities which, under its leadership, grew rapidly in Europe in the 11th and 12th centuries, St. Thomas Aquinas, the Church's "model theologian", not only argued that reason is in harmony with faith, he even recognized that reason can contribute to understanding revelation, and so encouraged intellectual development. He was not unlike other medieval theologians who sought out reason in the effort to defend his faith. Some of today's scholars, such as Stanley Jaki, have claimed that Christianity with its particular worldview, was a crucial factor for the emergence of modern science. Some scholars and historians attributes Christianity to having contributed to the rise of the Scientific Revolution.

Professor Noah J Efron says that "Generations of historians and sociologists have discovered many ways in which Christians, Christian beliefs, and Christian institutions played crucial roles in fashioning the tenets, methods, and institutions of what in time became modern science. They found that some forms of Christianity provided the motivation to study nature systematically..." Virtually all modern scholars and historians agree that Christianity moved many early-modern intellectuals to study nature systematically.

Christian Scholars and Scientists have made noted contributions to science and technology fields, as well as medicine. According to 100 Years of Nobel Prizes a review of Nobel prizes award between 1901 and 2000 reveals that (65.4%) of Nobel Prizes Laureates, have identified Christianity in its various forms as their religious preference. Overall, Christians have won a total of 72.5% in Chemistry between 1901 and 2000, 65.3% in Physics, 62% in Medicine, 54% in Economics.

=== Eastern Christianity ===
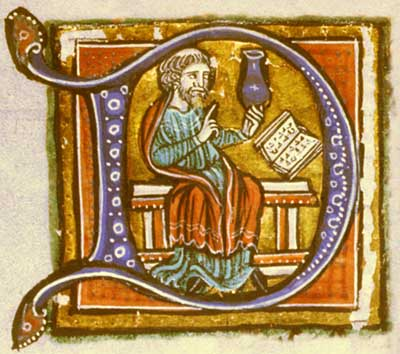
luminure from the Hunayn ibn-Ishaq al-'Ibadi manuscript of the Isagoge: Hunayn ibn-Ishaq was a famous and influential Christian scholar, physician, and scientist of ethnic Arab descent

Byzantine science was essentially classical science, and played an important and crucial role in the transmission of classical knowledge to the Islamic world and to Renaissance Italy. Many of the most distinguished classical scholars held high office in the Eastern Orthodox Church. Therefore, Byzantine science was in every period closely connected with ancient-pagan philosophy, and metaphysics. Despite some opposition to pagan learning, many of the most distinguished classical scholars held high office in the Church. The writings of antiquity never ceased to be cultivated in the Byzantine empire due to the impetus given to classical studies by the Academy of Athens in the 4th and 5th centuries, the vigor of the philosophical academy of Alexandria, and to the services of the University of Constantinople, which concerned itself entirely with secular subjects, to the exclusion of theology, which was taught in the Patriarchical Academy. Even the latter offered instruction in the ancient classics, and included literary, philosophical, and scientific texts in its curriculum. The monastic schools concentrated upon the Bible, theology, and liturgy. Therefore, the monastic scriptoria expended most of their efforts upon the transcription of ecclesiastical manuscripts, while ancient-pagan literature was transcribed, summarized, excerpted, and annotated by laymen or clergy like Photios, Arethas of Caesarea, Eustathius of Thessalonica, and Basilius Bessarion. Byzantine scientists preserved and continued the legacy of the great Ancient Greek mathematicians and put mathematics in practice. In early Byzantium (5th to 7th century) the architects and mathematicians Isidore of Miletus and Anthemius of Tralles used complex mathematical formulas to construct the great Hagia Sophia church, a technological breakthrough for its time and for centuries afterwards due to its striking geometry, bold design and height. In late Byzantium (9th to 12th century) mathematicians like Michael Psellos considered mathematics as a way to interpret the world.

Middle Eastern Christians especially the adherents of the Church of the East (Nestorians), contributed to the Arab Islamic Civilization during the Umayyad and the Abbasid periods by translating works of Greek philosophers to Syriac and afterwards to Arabic. During the 4th through the 7th centuries, scholarly work in the Syriac and Greek languages was either newly initiated, or carried on from the Hellenistic period. Centers of learning and of transmission of classical wisdom included colleges such as the School of Nisibis, and later the School of Edessa, and the hospital and medical academy of Jundishapur; libraries included the Library of Alexandria and the Imperial Library of Constantinople; other centers of translation and learning functioned at Merv, Salonika, Nishapur and Ctesiphon, situated just south of what later became Baghdad.

Many scholars of the House of Wisdom were of Christian background; the House of Wisdom was a library, translation institute, and academy established in Abbasid-era Baghdad, Iraq. Nestorians played a prominent role in the formation of Arab culture, with the Jundishapur school being prominent in the late Sassanid, Umayyad and early Abbasid periods.

The migration waves of Byzantine scholars and émigrés in the period following the Crusader sacking of Constantinople in 1204 and the end of the Byzantine Empire in 1453, is considered by many scholars key to the revival of Greek and Roman studies that led to the development of the Renaissance humanism, and science. These émigrés brought to Western Europe the relatively well-preserved remnants and accumulated knowledge of their own (Greek) civilization, which had mostly not survived the Early Middle Ages in the West. According to the Encyclopædia Britannica: "Many modern scholars also agree that the exodus of Greeks to Italy as a result of this event marked the end of the Middle Ages and the beginning of the Renaissance".

=== Catholic Church ===
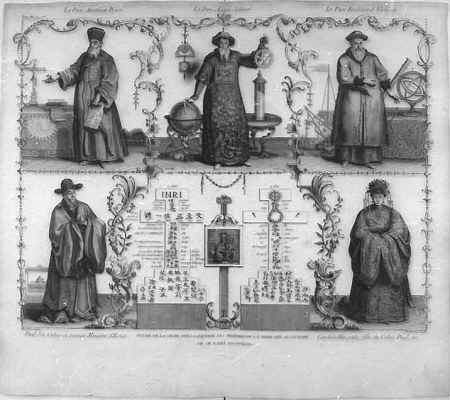
Jesuit scholars in China. Top: Matteo Ricci, Adam Schall and Ferdinand Verbiest (1623–88); Bottom: Paul Siu (Xu Guangqi), Colao or Prime Minister of State, and his granddaughter Candide Hiu.

While refined and clarified over the centuries, the Roman Catholic position on the relationship between science and religion is one of harmony, and has maintained the teaching of natural law as set forth by Thomas Aquinas. For example, regarding scientific study such as that of evolution, the church's unofficial position is an example of theistic evolution, stating that faith and scientific findings regarding human evolution are not in conflict, though humans are regarded as a special creation, and that the existence of God is required to explain both monogenism and the spiritual component of human origins. Catholic schools have included all manners of scientific study in their curriculum for many centuries.

Galileo once stated "The intention of the Holy Spirit is to teach us how to go to heaven, not how the heavens go." In 1981 John Paul II, then pope of the Roman Catholic Church, spoke of the relationship this way: "The Bible itself speaks to us of the origin of the universe and its make-up, not in order to provide us with a scientific treatise, but in order to state the correct relationships of man with God and with the universe. Sacred Scripture wishes simply to declare that the world was created by God, and in order to teach this truth it expresses itself in the terms of the cosmology in use at the time of the writer".

The influence of the Church on Western letters and learning has been formidable. The ancient texts of the Bible have deeply influenced Western art, literature and culture. For centuries following the collapse of the Western Roman Empire, small monastic communities were practically the only outposts of literacy in Western Europe. In time, the Cathedral schools developed into Europe's earliest universities and the church has established thousands of primary, secondary and tertiary institutions throughout the world in the centuries since. The Church and clergymen have also sought at different times to censor texts and scholars. Thus different schools of opinion exist as to the role and influence of the Church in relation to western letters and learning.

Numbers written with Cistercian numerals. From left to right: 1 in units place, 2 in tens place (20), 3 in hundreds place (300), 4 in thousands place (4000), then compound numbers 5555, 6789, 9394.

The Catholic Cistercian order used its own numbering system, which could express numbers from 0 to 9999 in a single sign. According to one modern Cistercian, "enterprise and entrepreneurial spirit" have always been a part of the order's identity, and the Cistercians "were catalysts for development of a market economy" in 12th-century Europe. Until the Industrial Revolution, most of the technological advances in Europe were made in the monasteries. According to the medievalist Jean Gimpel, their high level of industrial technology facilitated the diffusion of new techniques: "Every monastery had a model factory, often as large as the church and only several feet away, and waterpower drove the machinery of the various industries located on its floor." Waterpower was used for crushing wheat, sieving flour, fulling cloth and tanning – a "level of technological achievement [that] could have been observed in practically all" of the Cistercian monasteries. The English science historian James Burke examines the impact of Cistercian waterpower, derived from Roman watermill technology such as that of Barbegal aqueduct and mill near Arles in the fourth of his ten-part Connections TV series, called "Faith in Numbers". The Cistercians made major contributions to culture and technology in medieval Europe: Cistercian architecture is considered one of the most beautiful styles of medieval architecture; and the Cistercians were the main force of technological diffusion in fields such as agriculture and hydraulic engineering.

One view, first propounded by Enlightenment philosophers, asserts that the Church's doctrines are entirely superstitious and have hindered the progress of civilization. Communist states have made similar arguments in their education in order to inculcate a negative view of Catholicism (and religion in general) in their citizens. The most famous incidents cited by such critics are the Church's condemnations of the teachings of Copernicus, Galileo Galilei and Johannes Kepler.

The Church's priest-scientists, many of whom were Jesuits, have been among the leading lights in astronomy, genetics, geomagnetism, meteorology, seismology, and solar physics, becoming some of the "fathers" of these sciences. Examples include important churchmen such as the Augustinian abbot Gregor Mendel (pioneer in the study of genetics), Roger Bacon (a Franciscan friar who was one of the early advocates of the scientific method), and Belgian priest Georges Lemaître (the first to propose the Big Bang theory). Other notable priest scientists have included Albertus Magnus, Robert Grosseteste, Nicholas Steno, Francesco Grimaldi, Giambattista Riccioli, Roger Boscovich, and Athanasius Kircher. Even more numerous are Catholic laity involved in science:Henri Becquerel who discovered radioactivity; Galvani, Volta, Ampere, Marconi, pioneers in electricity and telecommunications; Lavoisier, "father of modern chemistry"; Vesalius, founder of modern human anatomy; and Cauchy, one of the mathematicians who laid the rigorous foundations of calculus. Throughout history many of the Roman Catholic clerics have made contributions to science, mostly during periods of Church domination of public life. The Catholic Church has also produced many lay scientists and mathematicians.

==== Jesuits in science ====
The Jesuits have made numerous significant contributions to the development of science. For example, the Jesuits have dedicated significant study to earthquakes, and seismology has been described as "the Jesuit science". The Jesuits have been described as "the single most important contributor to experimental physics in the seventeenth century". According to Jonathan Wright in his book God's Soldiers, by the 18th century the Jesuits had "contributed to the development of pendulum clocks, pantographs, barometers, reflecting telescopes and microscopes, to scientific fields as various as magnetism, optics and electricity. They observed, in some cases before anyone else, the colored bands on Jupiter's surface, the Andromeda nebula and Saturn's rings. They theorized about the circulation of the blood (independently of Harvey), the theoretical possibility of flight, the way the moon affected the tides, and the wave-like nature of light."

=== Protestant ===
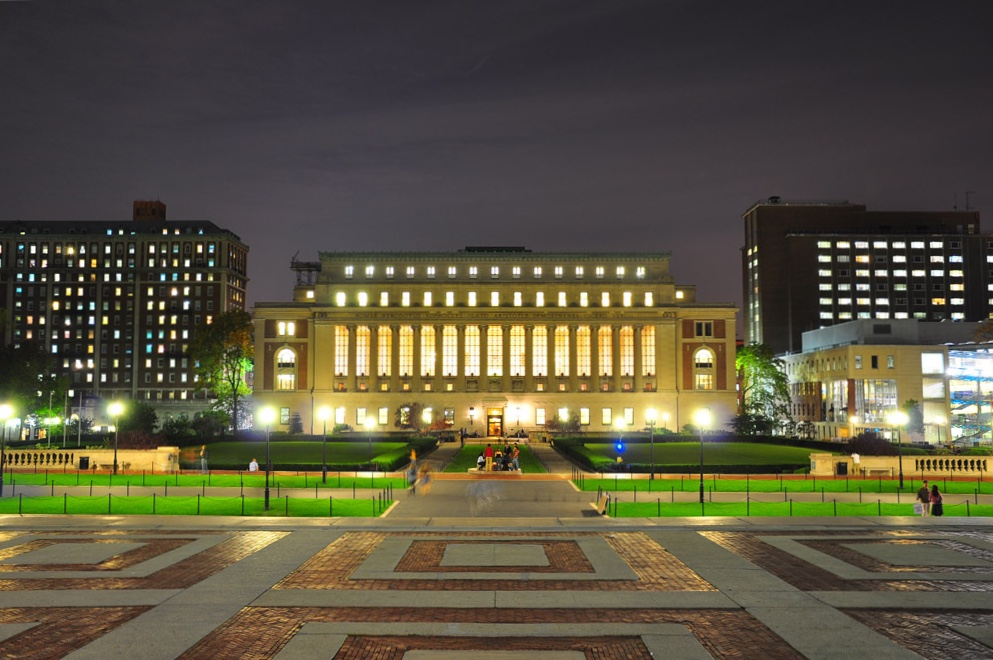
Columbia University was established by the Church of England

Protestantism had an important influence on science. According to the Merton Thesis there was a positive correlation between the rise of Puritanism and Protestant Pietism on the one hand and early experimental science on the other. The Merton Thesis has two separate parts: Firstly, it presents a theory that science changes due to an accumulation of observations and improvement in experimental techniques and methodology; secondly, it puts forward the argument that the popularity of science in 17th-century England and the religious demography of the Royal Society (English scientists of that time were predominantly Puritans or other Protestants) can be explained by a correlation between Protestantism and the scientific values. In his theory, Robert K. Merton focused on English Puritanism and German Pietism as having been responsible for the development of the Scientific Revolution of the 17th and 18th centuries. Merton explained that the connection between religious affiliation and interest in science was the result of a significant synergy between the ascetic Protestant values and those of modern science. Protestant values encouraged scientific research by allowing science to study God's influence on the world and thus providing a religious justification for scientific research.

== Thought and work ethic ==
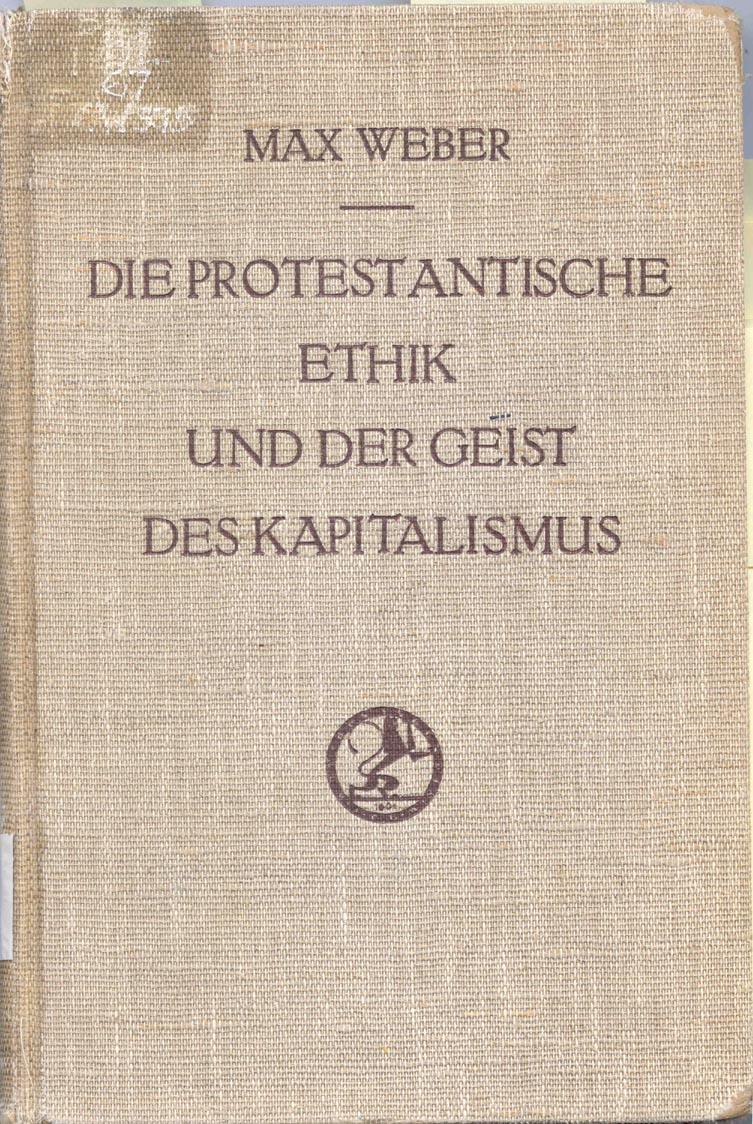
Cover of the original German edition of The Protestant Ethic and the Spirit of Capitalism

The notion of "Christian finance" refers to banking and financial activities which came into existence several centuries ago. Whether the activities of the Knights Templar (12th century), Mounts of Piety (appeared in 1462) or the Apostolic Chamber attached directly to the Vatican, a number of operations of a banking nature (money loan, guarantee, etc.) or a financial nature (issuance of securities, investments) is proved, despite the prohibition of usury and the Church distrust against exchange activities (opposed to production activities).

Francisco de Vitoria, a disciple of Thomas Aquinas and a Catholic thinker who studied the issue regarding the human rights of colonized natives, is recognized by the United Nations as a father of international law, and now also by historians of economics and democracy as a leading light for the West's democracy and rapid economic development. Joseph Schumpeter, an economist of the 20th century, referring to the Scholastics, wrote, "it is they who come nearer than does any other group to having been the 'founders' of scientific economics." Other economists and historians, such as Raymond de Roover, Marjorie Grice-Hutchinson, and Alejandro Chafuen, have also made similar statements.

The Protestant concept of God and man allows believers to use all their God-given faculties, including the power of reason. That means that they are allowed to explore God's creation and, according to Genesis 2:15, make use of it in a responsible and sustainable way. Thus a cultural climate was created that greatly enhanced the development of the humanities and the sciences. Another consequence of the Protestant understanding of man is that the believers, in gratitude for their election and redemption in Christ, are to follow God's commandments. Industry, frugality, calling, discipline, and a strong sense of responsibility are at the heart of their moral code. In particular, John Calvin rejected luxury. Therefore, craftsmen, industrialists, and other businessmen were able to reinvest the greater part of their profits in the most efficient machinery and the most modern production methods that were based on progress in the sciences and technology. As a result, productivity grew, which led to increased profits and enabled employers to pay higher wages. In this way, the economy, the sciences, and technology reinforced each other. The chance to participate in the economic success of technological inventions was a strong incentive to both inventors and investors. The Protestant work ethic was an important force behind the unplanned and uncoordinated mass action that influenced the development of capitalism and the Industrial Revolution. This idea is also known as the "Protestant ethic thesis".

Some mainline Protestant denominations such as Episcopalians and Presbyterians and congregationalist tend to be considerably wealthier and better educated (having high proportion of graduate and post-graduate degrees per capita) than most other religious groups in America, and are disproportionately represented in the upper reaches of American business, law and politics, especially the Republican Party. Large numbers of the most wealthy and affluent American families as the Vanderbilts, the Astors, Rockefeller, Du Pont, Roosevelt, Forbes, Whitneys, Mellons, the Morgans and Harrimans are Mainline Protestant families. The Boston Brahmins, who were regarded as the nation's social and cultural elites, were often associated with the American upper class, Harvard University; and the Episcopal Church. The Old Philadelphians were often associated with the American upper class and the Episcopal Church and Quakerism. These families were influential in the development and leadership of arts, culture, science, medicine, law, politics, industry and trade in the United States.

The rise of Protestantism in the 16th contributed to the development of banking in Northern Europe. In the late 18th century, Protestant merchant families increasingly moved into banking, especially in trading countries such as the United Kingdom (Barings), Germany (Schroders, Berenbergs) and the Netherlands (Hope & Co., Gülcher & Mulder) At the same time, new types of financial activities broadened the scope of banking far beyond its origins. One school of thought attributes Calvinism with setting the stage for the later development of capitalism in northern Europe. The Morgan family is an American Episcopal Church family and banking dynasty, which became prominent in the U.S. and throughout the world in the late 19th and early 20th centuries. Catholic banking families includes House of Medici, Welser family, Fugger family, and Simonetti family.

Some academics have theorized that Lutheranism, the dominant traditional religion of the Nordic countries, had an effect on the development of social democracy there and the Nordic model. Schröder posits that Lutheranism promoted the idea of a nationwide community of believers and led to increased state involvement in economic and social life, allowing for nationwide welfare solidarity and economic co-ordination. Esa Mangeloja says that the revival movements helped to pave the way for the modern Finnish welfare state. During that process, the church lost some of its most important social responsibilities (health care, education, and social work) as these tasks were assumed by the secular Finnish state. Pauli Kettunen presents the Nordic model as the outcome of a sort of mythical "Lutheran peasant enlightenment", portraying the Nordic model as the result of a sort of "secularized Lutheranism"; however, mainstream academic discourse on the subject focuses on "historical specificity", with the centralized structure of the Lutheran church being but one aspect of the cultural values and state structures that led to the development of the welfare state in Scandinavia.

== Festivals ==
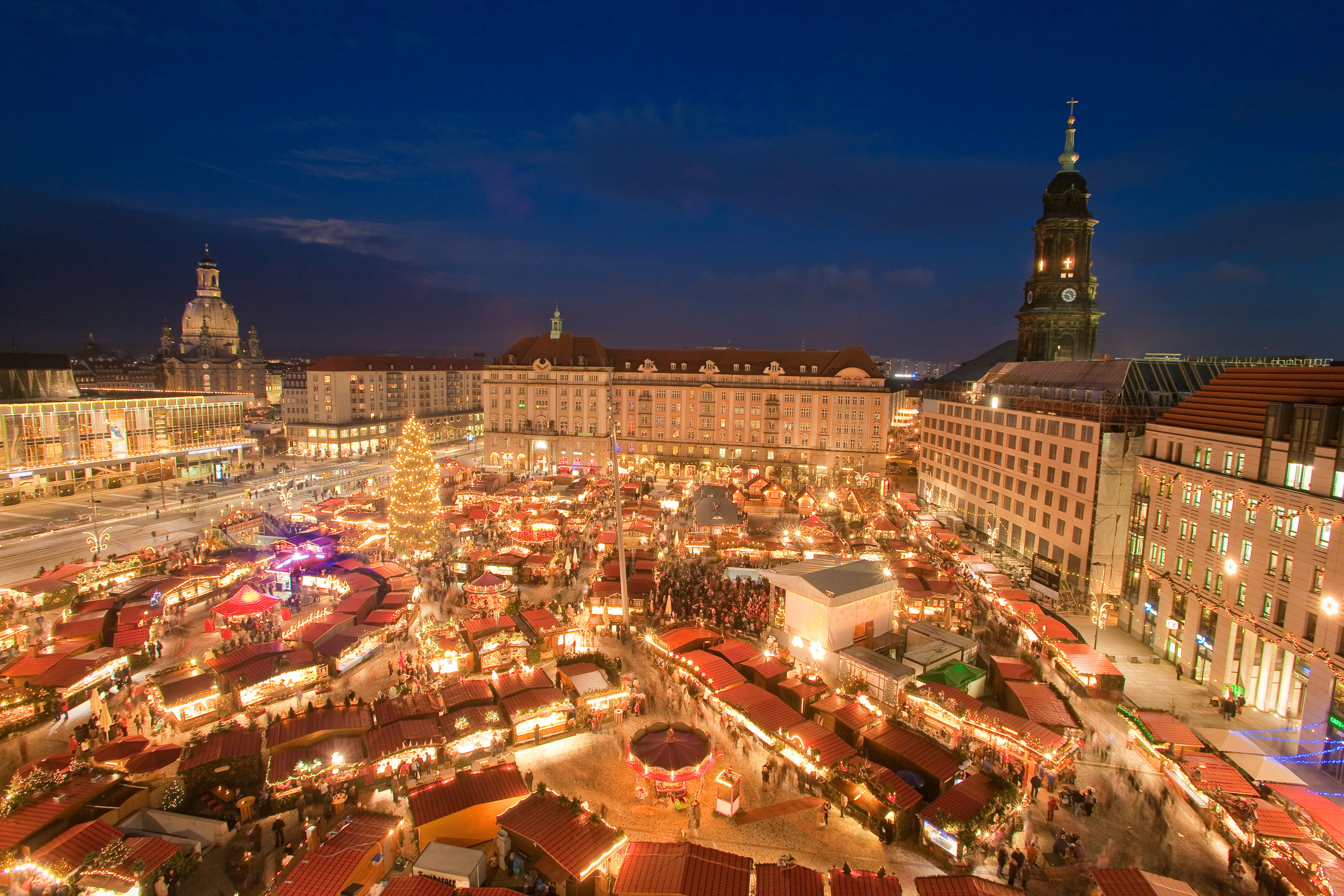
The Striezelmarkt in Dresden, Germany, is considered the first genuine Christmas market in the world.

Roman Catholics, Anglicans, Eastern Christians, and traditional Protestant communities frame worship around the liturgical year. The liturgical cycle divides the year into a series of seasons, each with their theological emphases, and modes of prayer, which can be signified by different ways of decorating churches, colours of paraments and vestments for clergy, scriptural readings, themes for preaching and even different traditions and practices often observed personally or in the home.

Western Christian liturgical calendars are based on the cycle of the Roman Rite of the Catholic Church, and Eastern Christians use analogous calendars based on the cycle of their respective rites. Calendars set aside holy days, such as solemnities which commemorate an event in the life of Jesus or Mary, the saints, periods of fasting such as Lent, and other pious events such as memoria or lesser festivals commemorating saints. Christian groups that do not follow a liturgical tradition often retain certain celebrations, such as Christmas, Easter and Pentecost: these are the celebrations of Christ's birth, resurrection and the descent of the Holy Spirit upon the Church, respectively. A few denominations make no use of a liturgical calendar.

Christmas (or Feast of the Nativity) is an annual festival commemorating the birth of Jesus Christ, observed as a religious and cultural celebration among billions of people around the world. Christmas Day is a public holiday in many of the world's nations, is celebrated religiously by a majority of Christians, as well as culturally by many non-Christians, and forms an integral part of the holiday season centered around it. Popular modern customs of the holiday include gift giving; completing an Advent calendar or Advent wreath; Christmas music and caroling; viewing a Nativity play; an exchange of Christmas cards; church services; a special meal; and the display of various Christmas decorations, including Christmas trees, Christmas lights, nativity scenes, garlands, wreaths, mistletoe, and holly. In addition, several closely related and often interchangeable figures, known as Santa Claus, Father Christmas, Saint Nicholas, and Christkind, are associated with bringing gifts to children during the Christmas season and have their own body of traditions and lore.

Easter or Resurrection Sunday, is a festival and holiday commemorating the resurrection of Jesus from the dead, described in the New Testament as having occurred on the third day after his burial following his crucifixion by the Romans at Calvary c. 30 AD. Easter customs vary across the Christian world, and include sunrise services, exclaiming the Paschal greeting, clipping the church, and decorating Easter eggs (symbols of the empty tomb). The Easter lily, a symbol of the resurrection, traditionally decorates the chancel area of churches on this day and for the rest of Eastertide. Additional customs that have become associated with Easter and are observed by both Christians and some non-Christians include egg hunting, the Easter Bunny, and Easter parades. There are also various traditional Easter foods that vary regionally.

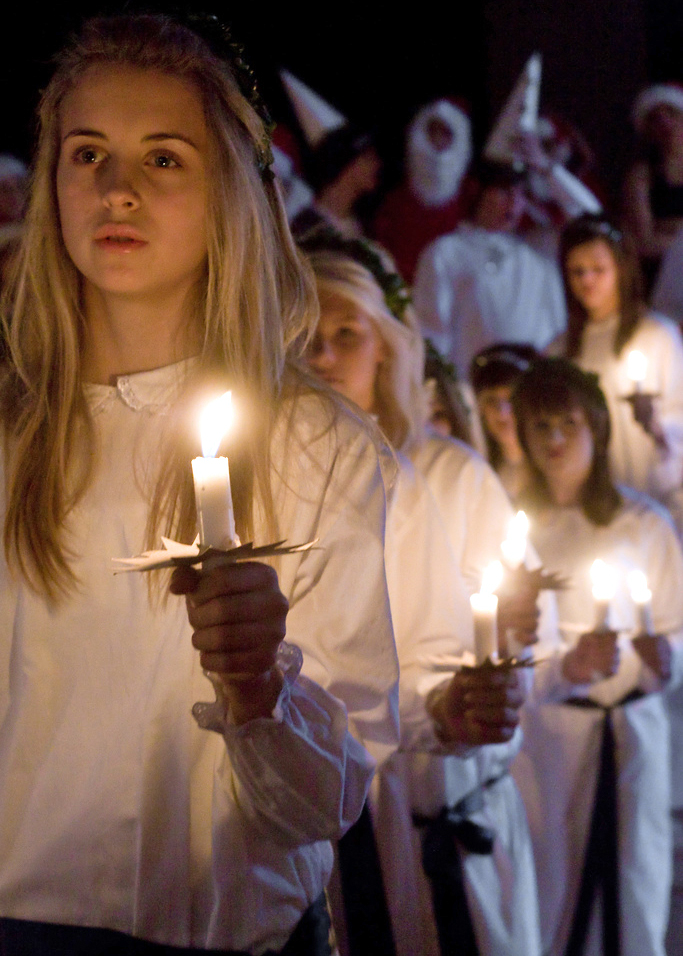
Saint Lucy's Day procession in Sweden

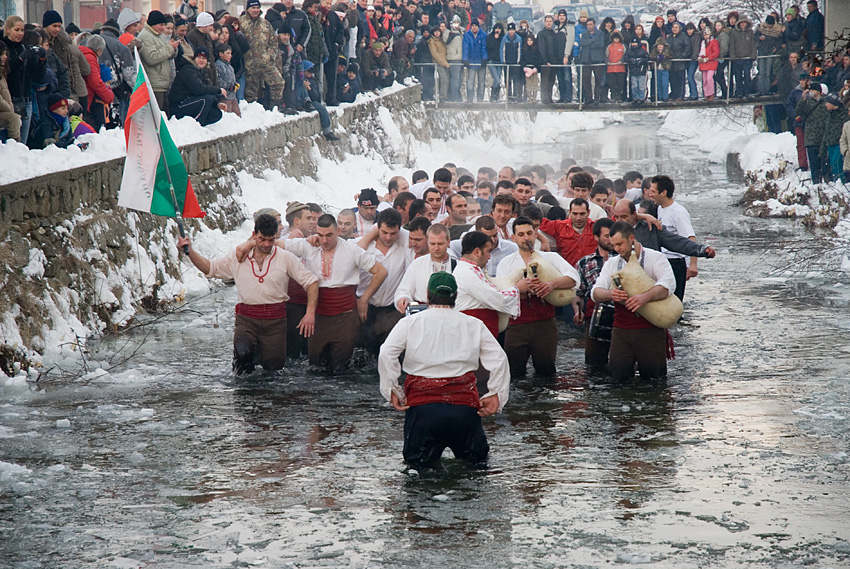
Celebrating the Epiphany in Bulgaria

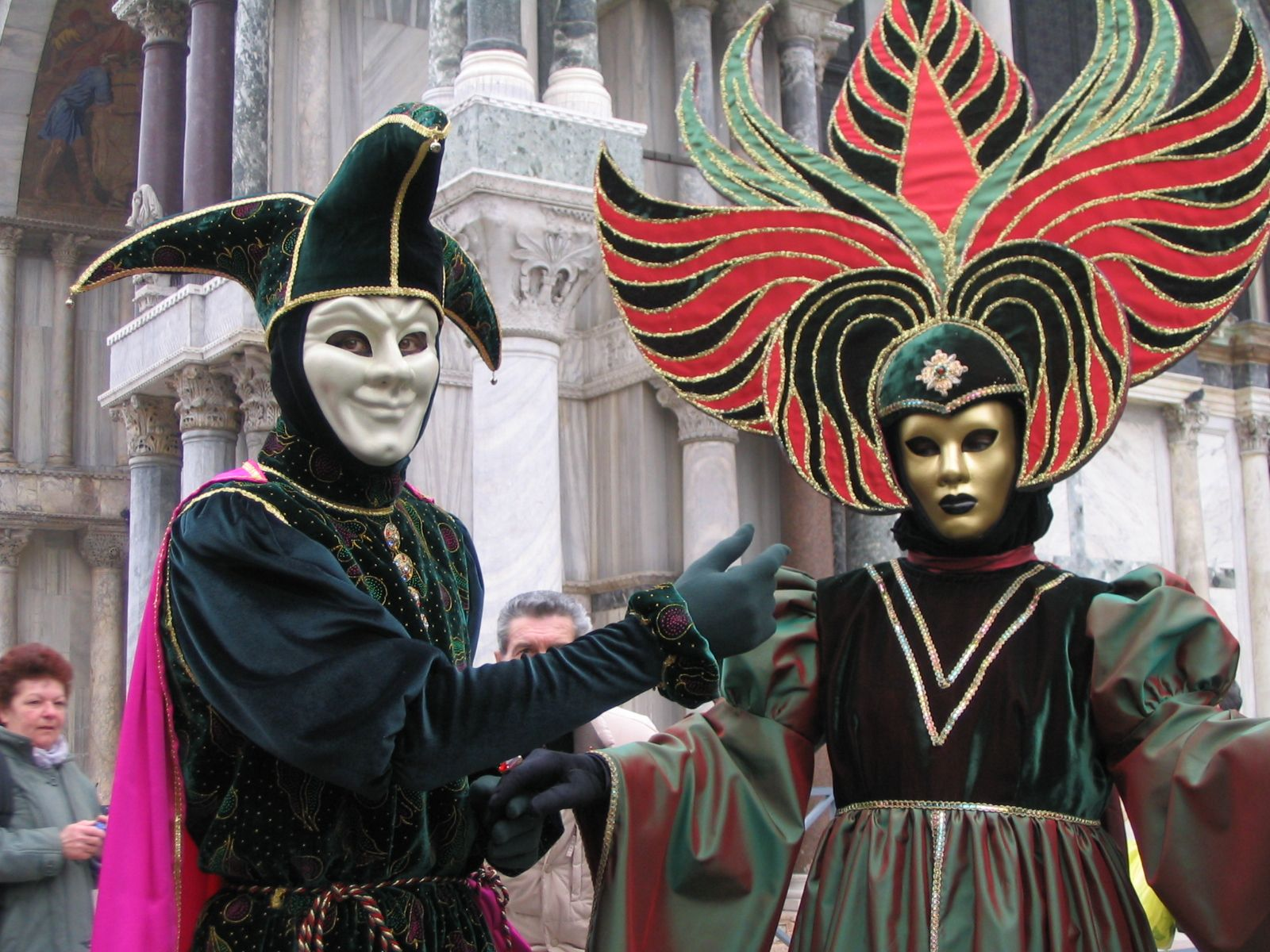
Carnival of Venice

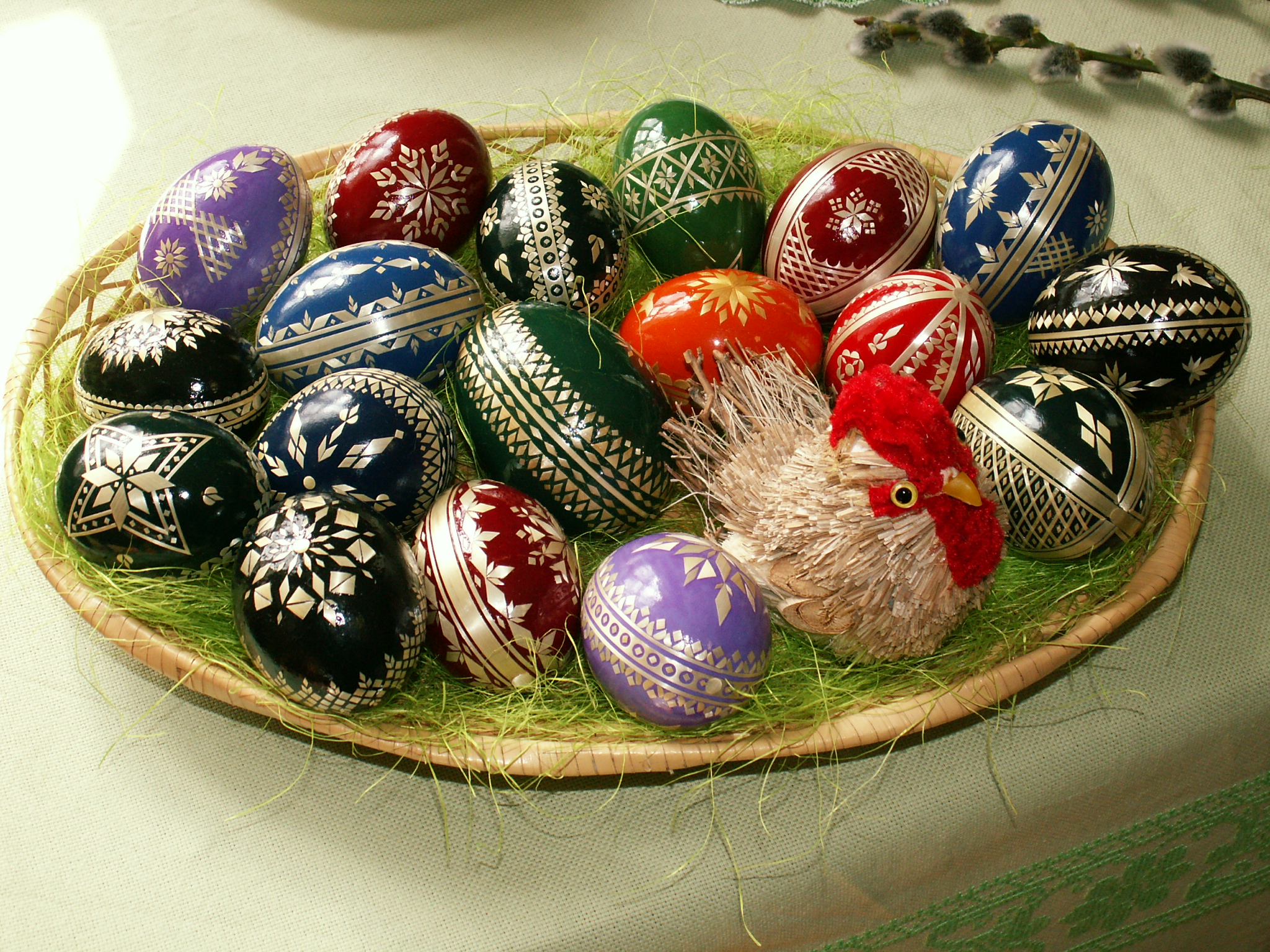
Easter eggs are a popular cultural symbol of Easter

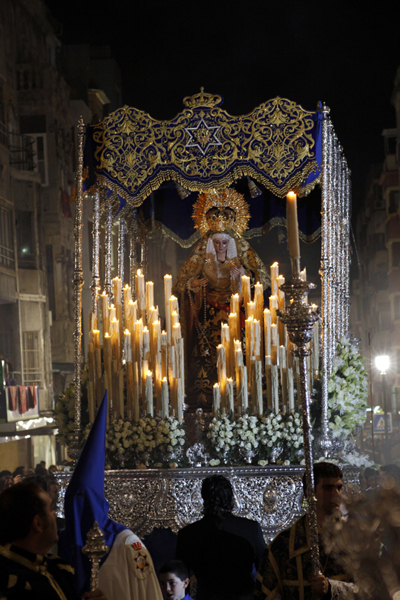
Procession of pasos during the Holy Week in Spain

== Religious life ==
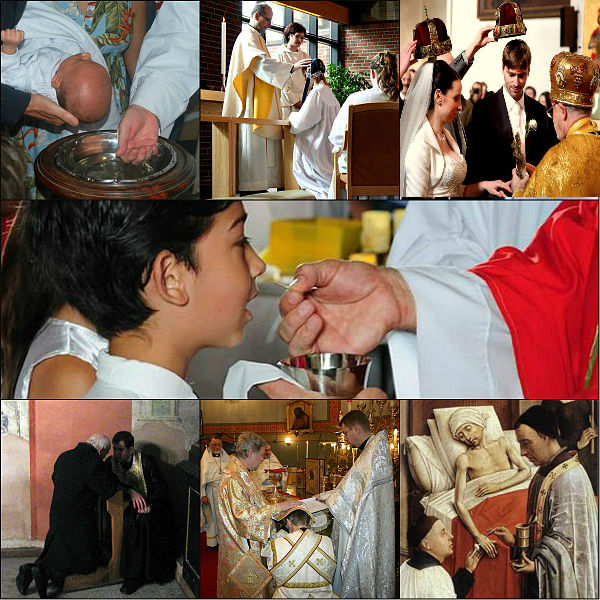
The seven sacraments of the Catholic church: Baptism, Confirmation, Matrimony, Eucharist, Penance, Holy Orders and the Anointing of the Sick.

Roman Catholic theology enumerates seven sacraments: Baptism (Christening), Confirmation (Chrismation), Eucharist (Communion), Penance (Reconciliation), Anointing of the Sick (before the Second Vatican Council generally called Extreme Unction), Matrimony

In Christian belief and practice, a sacrament is a rite, instituted by Christ, that mediates grace, constituting a sacred mystery. The term is derived from the Latin word sacramentum, which was used to translate the Greek word for mystery. Views concerning both what rites are sacramental, and what it means for an act to be a sacrament vary among Christian denominations and traditions.

The most conventional functional definition of a sacrament is that it is an outward sign, instituted by Christ, that conveys an inward, spiritual grace through Christ. The two most widely accepted sacraments are Baptism and the Eucharist (or Holy Communion), however, the majority of Christians also recognize five additional sacraments: Confirmation (Chrismation in the Orthodox tradition), Holy orders (ordination), Penance (or Confession), Anointing of the Sick, and Matrimony (see Christian views on marriage).

Taken together, these are the Seven Sacraments as recognized by churches in the High Church tradition—notably Roman Catholic, Eastern Orthodox, Oriental Orthodox, Independent Catholic, Old Catholic, many Anglicans, and some Lutherans. Most other denominations and traditions typically affirm only Baptism and Eucharist as sacraments, while some Protestant groups, such as the Quakers, reject sacramental theology. Christian denominations, such as Baptists, which believe these rites do not communicate grace, prefer to call Baptism and Holy Communion ordinances rather than sacraments.

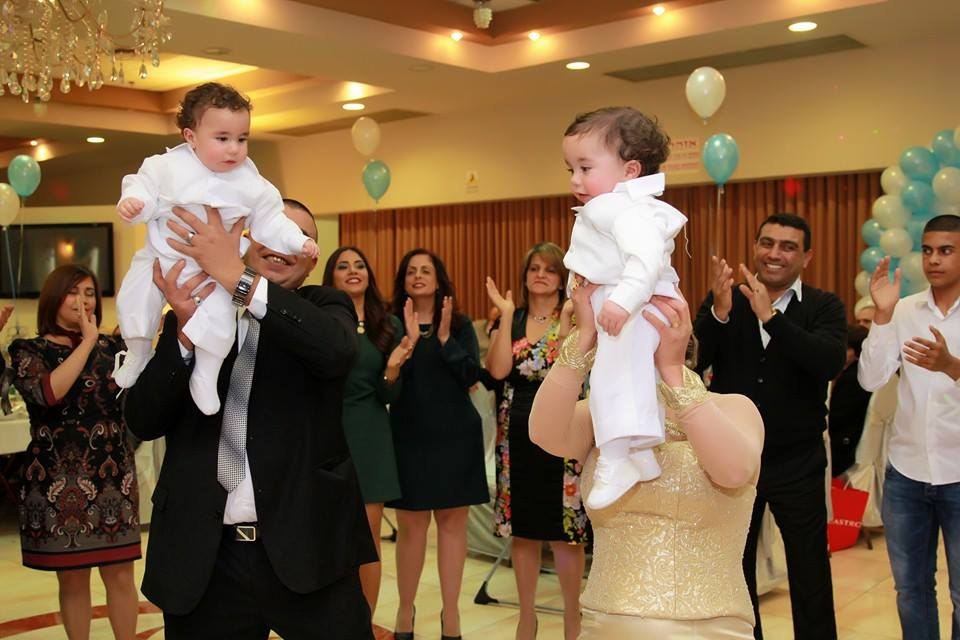
Coptic Children wearing traditional circumcision costumes.

Today, most Christian denominations are neutral about religious male circumcision, neither requiring it nor forbidding it. The practice is customary among the Coptic, Ethiopian, and Eritrean Orthodox Churches, and also some other African churches, as they require that their male members undergo circumcision. Even though most Christian denominations do not require male circumcision, male circumcision is widely practiced in many predominantly Christian countries and many Christian communities. Christian communities in Africa, the Anglosphere countries, the Philippines, the Middle East, South Korea and Oceania have high circumcision rates, While Christian communities in Europe and South America have low circumcision rates. The United States and the Philippines are the largest majority Christian countries in the world to extensively practice circumcision. Scholar Heather L. Armstrong writes that, as of 2021, about half of Christian males worldwide are circumcised, with most of them being located in Africa, Anglosphere countries, and the Philippines.

Worship can be varied for special events like baptisms or weddings in the service or significant feast days. In the early church, Christians and those yet to complete initiation would separate for the Eucharistic part of the worship. In many churches today, adults and children will separate for all or some of the service to receive age-appropriate teaching. Such children's worship is often called Sunday school or Sabbath school (Sunday schools are often held before rather than during services).

== Family life ==
Christian family saying grace before eating.

Christian culture puts notable emphasis on the family, and according to the work of scholars Max Weber, Alan Macfarlane, Steven Ozment, Jack Goody and Peter Laslett, the huge transformation that led to modern marriage in Western democracies was "fueled by the religio-cultural value system provided by elements of Judaism, early Christianity, Roman Catholic canon law and the Protestant Reformation". The anthropologist Joseph Henrich credits the medieval Catholic Church with dissolving traditional kinship networks and creating the modern nuclear family. Historically, extended families were the basic family unit in the Catholic culture and countries.

Most Christian denominations practice infant baptism to enter children into the faith. Some form of confirmation ritual occurs when the child has reached the age of reason and voluntarily accepts the religion. Ritual circumcision is used to mark Coptic Christian and Ethiopian Orthodox Christian infant males as belonging to the faith. During the early period of capitalism, the rise of a large, commercial middle class, mainly in the Protestant countries of the Netherlands and England, brought about a new family ideology centred around the upbringing of children. Puritanism stressed the importance of individual salvation and concern for the spiritual welfare of children. It became widely recognized that children possess rights on their own behalf. This included the rights of poor children to sustenance, membership in a community, education, and job training. The Poor Relief Acts in Elizabethan England put responsibility on each Parish to care for all the poor children in the area. And prior to the 20th century, three major branches of Christianity—Catholicism, Orthodoxy and Protestantism—as well as leading Protestant reformers Martin Luther and John Calvin generally held a critical perspective of birth control.

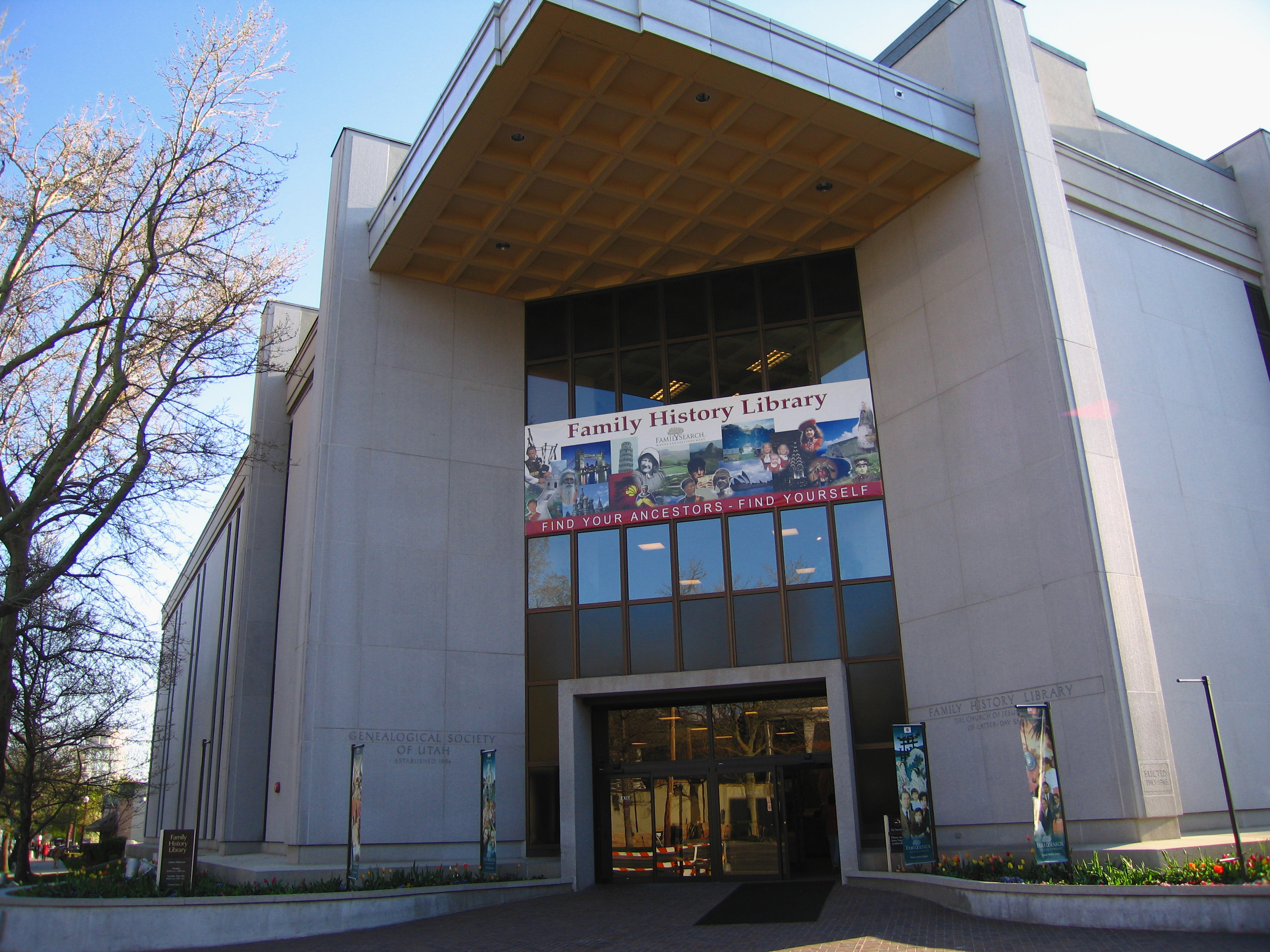
The church's Family History Library is the world's largest library dedicated to genealogical research.

The Church of Jesus Christ of Latter-day Saints puts notable emphasis on the family, and the distinctive concept of a united family which lives and progresses forever is at the core of Latter-day Saint doctrine. Church members are encouraged to marry and have children, and as a result, Latter-day Saint families tend to be larger than average. All sexual activity outside of marriage is considered a serious sin. All homosexual activity is considered sinful and same-sex marriages are not performed or supported by the LDS Church. Latter-day Saint fathers who hold the priesthood typically name and bless their children shortly after birth to formally give the child a name and generate a church record for them. Mormons tend to be very family-oriented and have strong connections across generations and with extended family, reflective of their belief that families can be sealed together beyond death. Mormons also have a strict law of chastity, requiring abstention from sexual relations outside heterosexual marriage and fidelity within marriage.

A Pew Center study in 2019 found that Christians around the world live in somewhat smaller households, on average, than non-Christians (4.5 vs. 5.1 members). 34% of world's Christian population live in two parent families with minor children, while 29% live in household with extended families, 11% live as couples without other family members, 9% live in household with least one child over the age of 18 with one or two parents, 7% live alone, and 6% live in single parent households. Christians in Asia and Pacific, Latin America and the Caribbean, Middle East and North Africa, and in Sub-Saharan Africa, overwhelmingly live in extended or two parent families with minor children. While more Christians in Europe and North America live alone or as couples without other family members.

== Cuisine ==
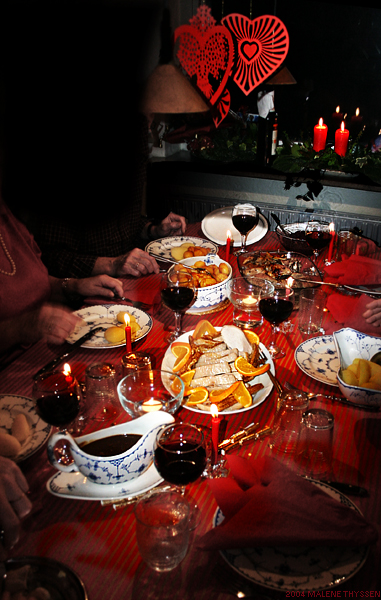
Danish Christmas dinner

In mainstream Nicene Christianity, there is no restriction on kinds of animals that can be eaten. This practice stems from Peter's vision of a sheet with animals, in which Saint Peter "sees a sheet containing animals of every description lowered from the sky." Nonetheless, the New Testament does give a few guidelines about the consumption of meat, practiced by the Christian Church today; one of these is not consuming food knowingly offered to pagan idols, a conviction that the early Church Fathers, such as Clement of Alexandria and Origen preached. In addition, Christians traditionally bless any food before eating it with a mealtime prayer (grace), as a sign of thanking God for the meal they have.

Slaughtering animals for food is often done without the trinitarian formula, although the Armenian Apostolic Church, among other Orthodox Christians, have rituals that "display obvious links with shechitah, Jewish kosher slaughter." The Bible, states Norman Geisler, stipulates one to "abstain from food sacrificed to idols, from blood, from meat of strangled animals". In the New Testament, Paul of Tarsus notes that some devout Christians may wish to abstain from consuming meat if it causes "my brother to stumble" in his faith with God. As such, some Christian monks, such as the Trappists, have adopted a policy of Christian vegetarianism. In addition, Christians of the Seventh-day Adventist tradition generally "avoid eating meat and highly spiced food". Christians in the Anglican, Catholic, Lutheran, Methodist, and Orthodox denominations traditionally observe a meat-free day, and meat free seasons especially during the liturgical season of Lent.

Some Christian denominations condone the moderate drinking of alcohol (moderationism), such as Anglicans, Catholics, Lutherans, and the Orthodox, although others, such as Adventists, Baptists, Methodists, and Pentecostals either abstain from or prohibit the consumption of alcohol (abstentionism and prohibitionism). However, all Christian Churches, in view of the biblical position on the issue, universally condemn drunkenness as sinful.

Christian cooking combines the food of many cultures in which Christian have lived. A special Christmas family meal is traditionally an important part of the holiday's celebration, and the food that is served varies greatly from country to country. Some regions, such as Sicily, have special meals for Christmas Eve, when 12 kinds of fish are served. In the United Kingdom and countries influenced by its traditions, a standard Christmas meal includes turkey, goose or other large bird, gravy, potatoes, vegetables, sometimes bread and cider. Special desserts are also prepared, such as Christmas pudding, mince pies, fruit cake and Yule log.

== Cleanliness ==
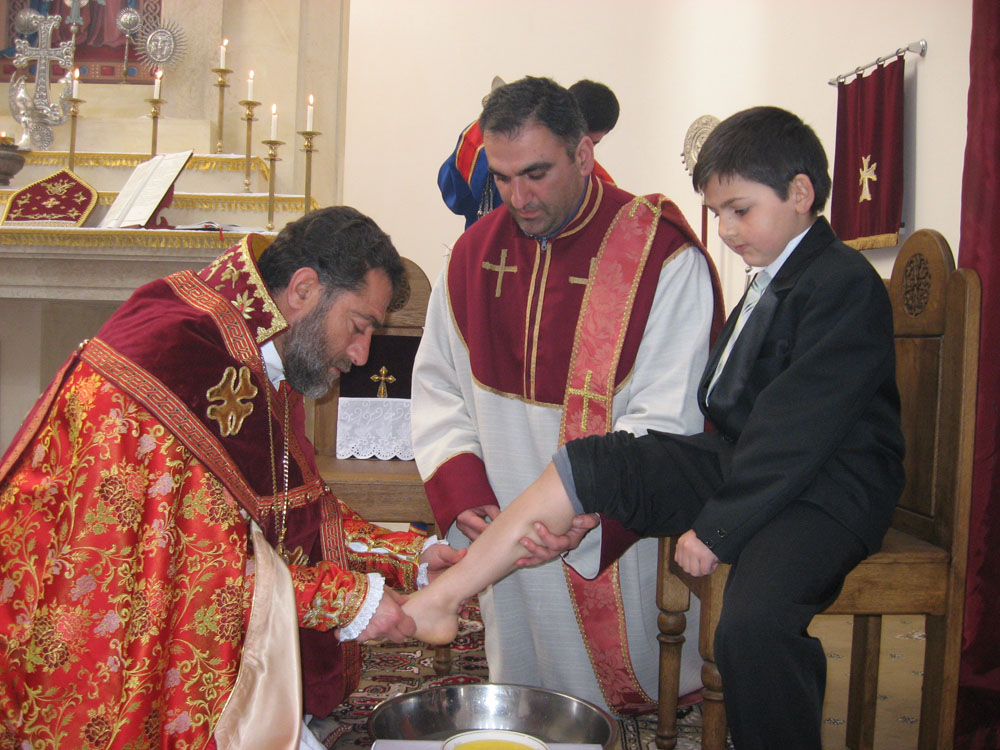
Bishop Sebouh Chouldjian of the Armenian Apostolic Church washing the feet of children.

The Bible has many rituals of purification relating to menstruation, childbirth, sexual relations, nocturnal emission, unusual bodily fluids, skin disease, death, and animal sacrifices. The Ethiopian Orthodox Tewahedo Church prescribes several kinds of hand washing for example after leaving the latrine, lavatory or bathhouse, or before prayer, or after eating a meal. The women in the Ethiopian Orthodox Tewahedo Church are prohibited from entering the church temple during menses; and the men do not enter a church the day after they have had intercourse with their wives.

Christianity has always placed a strong emphasis on hygiene, Despite the denunciation of the mixed bathing style of Roman pools by early Christian clergy, as well as the pagan custom of women naked bathing in front of men, this did not stop the Church from urging its followers to go to public baths for bathing, which contributed to hygiene and good health according to the Church Fathers, Clement of Alexandria and Tertullian. The Church also built public bathing facilities that were separate for both sexes near monasteries and pilgrimage sites; also, the popes situated baths within church basilicas and monasteries since the early Middle Ages. Pope Gregory the Great urged his followers on value of bathing as a bodily need.

Great bath houses were built in Byzantine centers such as Constantinople and Antioch, and the popes allocated to the Romans bathing through diaconia, or private Lateran baths, or even a myriad of monastic bath houses functioning in the 8th and 9th centuries. The popes maintained their baths in their residences, and bath houses including hot baths incorporated into Christian Church buildings or those of monasteries, which known as "charity baths" because they served both the clerics and needy poor people. Public bathing were common in medieval Christendom larger towns and cities such as Paris, Regensburg and Naples. Catholic religious orders of the Augustinians' and Benedictines' rules contained ritual purification, and inspired by Benedict of Nursia encouragement for the practice of therapeutic bathing; Benedictine monks played a role in the development and promotion of spas. Protestant Christianity also played a prominent role in the development of the British spas.

Contrary to popular belief bathing and sanitation were not lost in Europe with the collapse of the Roman Empire. Soapmaking first became an established trade during the so-called "Dark Ages". By the 15th century, the manufacture of soap in the Christendom had become virtually industrialized, with sources in Antwerp, Castile, Marseille, Naples and Venice. By the mid-19th century, the English urbanised middle classes had formed an ideology of cleanliness that ranked alongside typical Victorian concepts, such as Christianity, respectability and social progress. The Salvation Army has adopted movement of the deployment of the personal hygiene, and by providing personal hygiene products.

The use of water in many Christian countries is due in part to the biblical toilet etiquette which encourages washing after all instances of defecation. The bidet is common in predominantly Catholic countries where water is considered essential for anal cleansing, and in some traditionally Orthodox and Protestant countries such as Greece and Finland respectively, where bidet showers are common.

== Christian pop culture ==
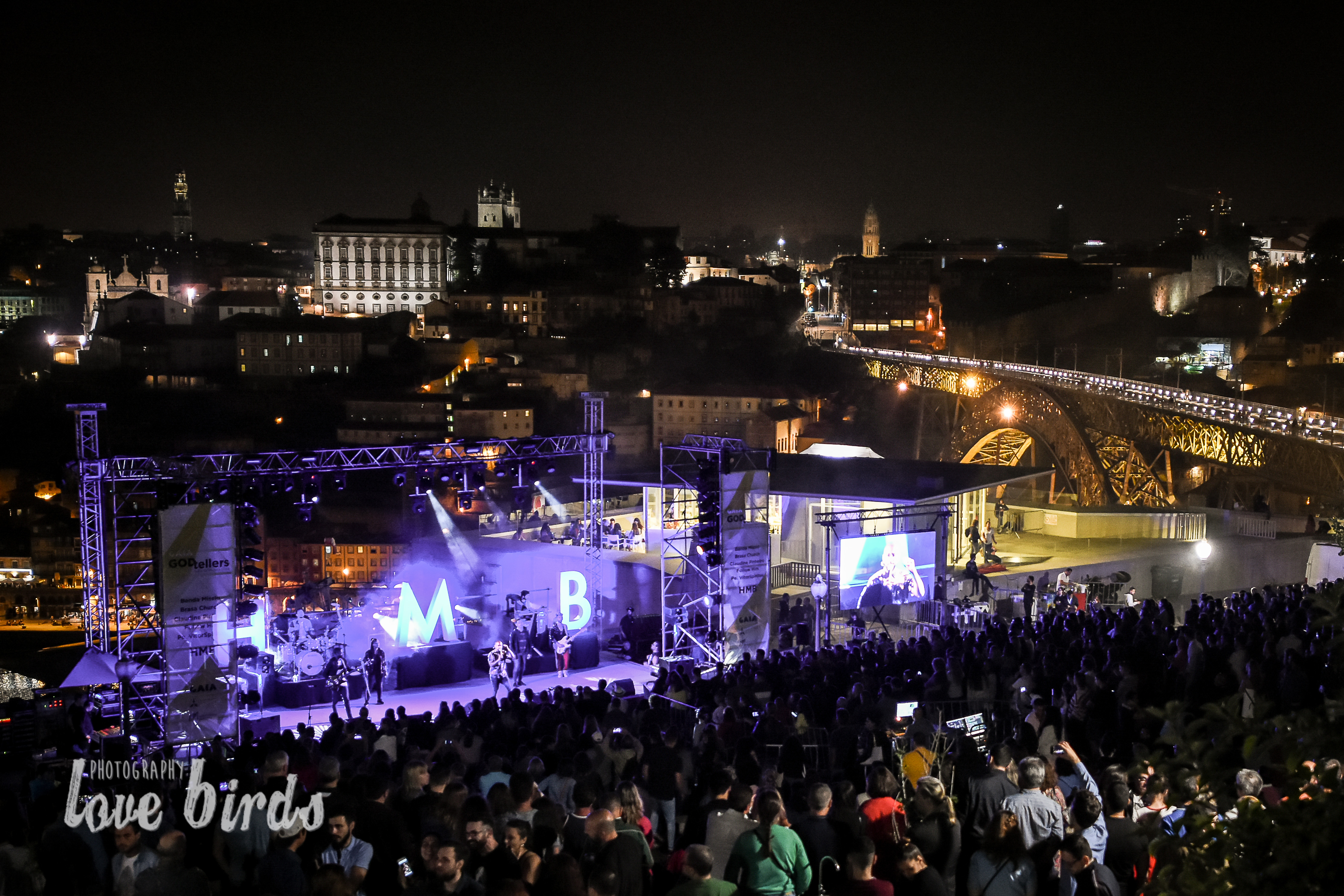
Christian music festival in Portugal.

Christian pop culture (or Christian popular culture), is the vernacular Christian culture that prevails in any given society. The content of popular culture is determined by the daily interactions, needs and desires, and cultural 'movements' that make up everyday lives of Christians. It can include any number of practices, including those pertaining to cooking, clothing, mass media and the many facets of entertainment such as sports and literature.

In modern urban mass societies, Christian pop culture has been crucially shaped by the development of industrial mass production, the introduction of new technologies of sound and image broadcasting and recording, and the growth of mass media industries—the film, broadcast radio and television, radio, video game, and the book publishing industries, as well as the print and electronic news media.

Items of Christian pop culture most typically appeal to a broad spectrum of Christians. Some argue that broad-appeal items dominate Christian pop culture because profit-making Christian companies that produce and sell items of Christian pop culture attempt to maximize their profits by emphasizing broadly appealing items. And yet the situation is more complex. To take the example of Christian pop music, it is not the case that the music industry can impose any product they wish. In fact, highly popular types of music have often first been elaborated in small, counter-cultural circles such as Christian punk rock or Christian rap.

Because the Christian pop industry is significantly smaller than the secular pop industry, a few organizations and companies dominate the market and have a strong influence over what is dominant within the industry.

Another source of Christian pop culture which makes it differ from pop culture is the influence from mega churches. Christian pop culture reflects the current popularity of megachurches, but also the uniting of smaller community churches. The culture has been led by Hillsong Church in particular.

=== Film industry ===
ChristianCinema.com is a website that lists movies related to Christianity.

The Christian film industry is an umbrella term for films containing a Christian themed message or moral, produced by Christian filmmakers to a Christian audience, and films produced by non-Christians with Christian audiences in mind. They are often interdenominational films, but can also be films targeting a specific denomination of Christianity. Popular mainstream studio productions of films with strong Christian messages or biblical stories, like Ben-Hur, The Ten Commandments, The Passion of the Christ, The Chronicles of Narnia: The Lion, the Witch and the Wardrobe, The Book of Eli, Machine Gun Preacher, The Star, The Flying House, Superbook and Silence, are not specifically part of the Christian film industry, being more agnostic about their audiences' religious beliefs. These films generally also have a much higher budget, production values and better known film stars, and are received more favourably with film critics.

The 2014 film God's Not Dead is one of the all-time most successful independent Christian films and the 2015 film War Room became a Box Office number-one film.

=== Televangelism ===
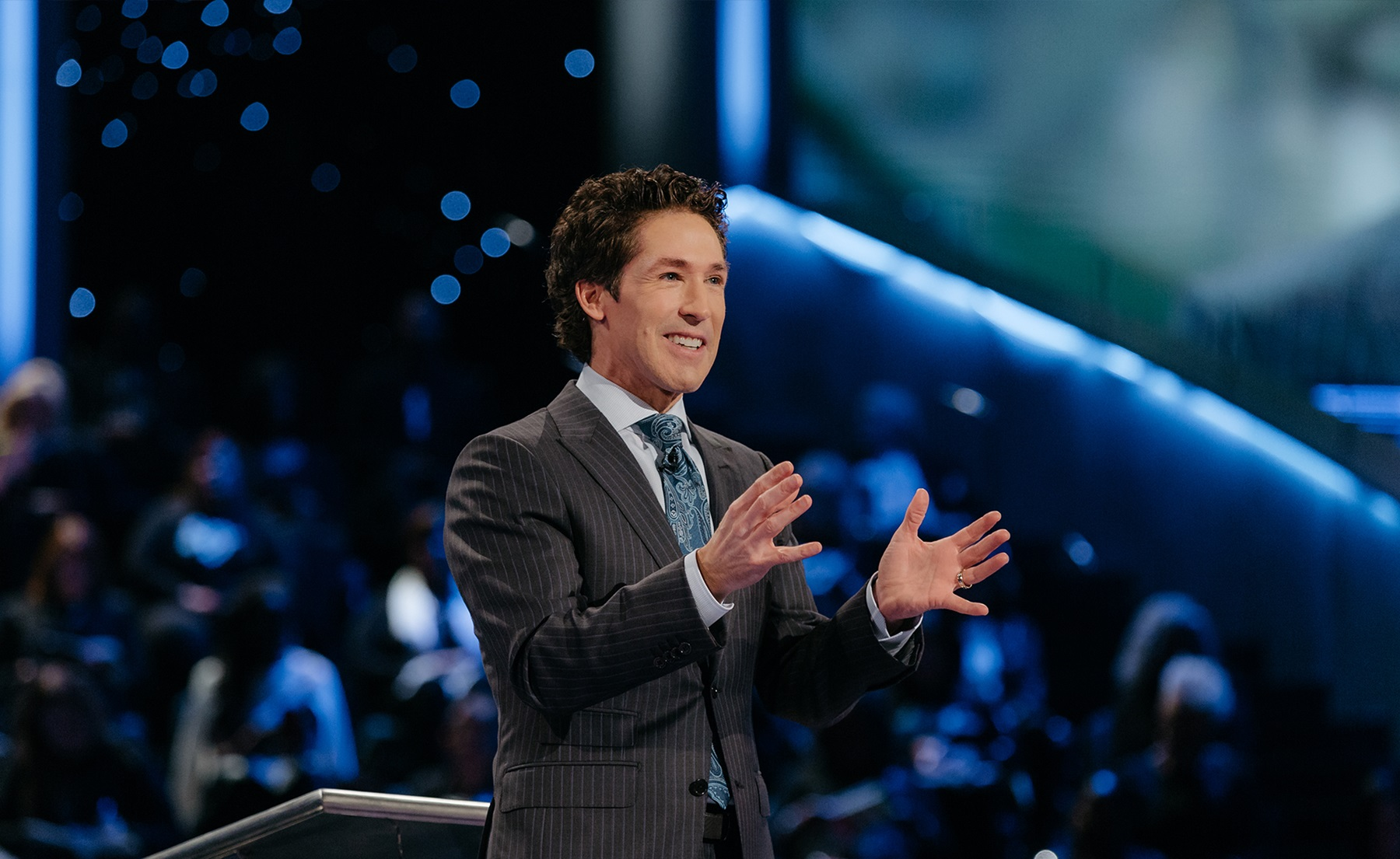
Televangelist Joel Osteen at Lakewood Church, a megachurch in Houston, Texas.

Televangelism (tele- "distance" and "evangelism", meaning "ministry", sometimes called teleministry) is the use of media, specifically radio and television, to communicate Christianity. Televangelists are ministers, whether official or self-proclaimed, who devote a large portion of their ministry to television broadcasting. Some televangelists are also regular pastors or ministers in their own places of worship (often a megachurch), but the majority of their followers come from TV and radio audiences. Others do not have a conventional congregation, and work primarily through television. The term is also used derisively by critics as an insinuation of aggrandizement by such ministers.

Televangelism began as a uniquely American phenomenon, resulting from a largely deregulated media where access to television networks and cable TV is open to virtually anyone who can afford it, combined with a large Christian population that is able to provide the necessary funding. It became especially popular among Evangelical Protestant audiences, whether independent or organized around Christian denominations. However, the increasing globalisation of broadcasting has enabled some American televangelists to reach a wider audience through international broadcast networks, including some that are specifically Christian in nature, such as Trinity Broadcasting Network (the world's largest religious television network), The God Channel, Christian Broadcasting Network, Australian Christian Channel, SAT-7 and Emmanuel TV. Domestically produced televangelism is increasingly present in some other nations such as Brazil. Christian television may include broadcast television or cable television channels whose entire broadcast programming schedule is television programs directly related to Christianity or shows including comedy, action, drama, reality, dramatizations and variety shows, movies, and mini-series; which are part of the overall programming of a general-interest television station.

== Christianophile ==
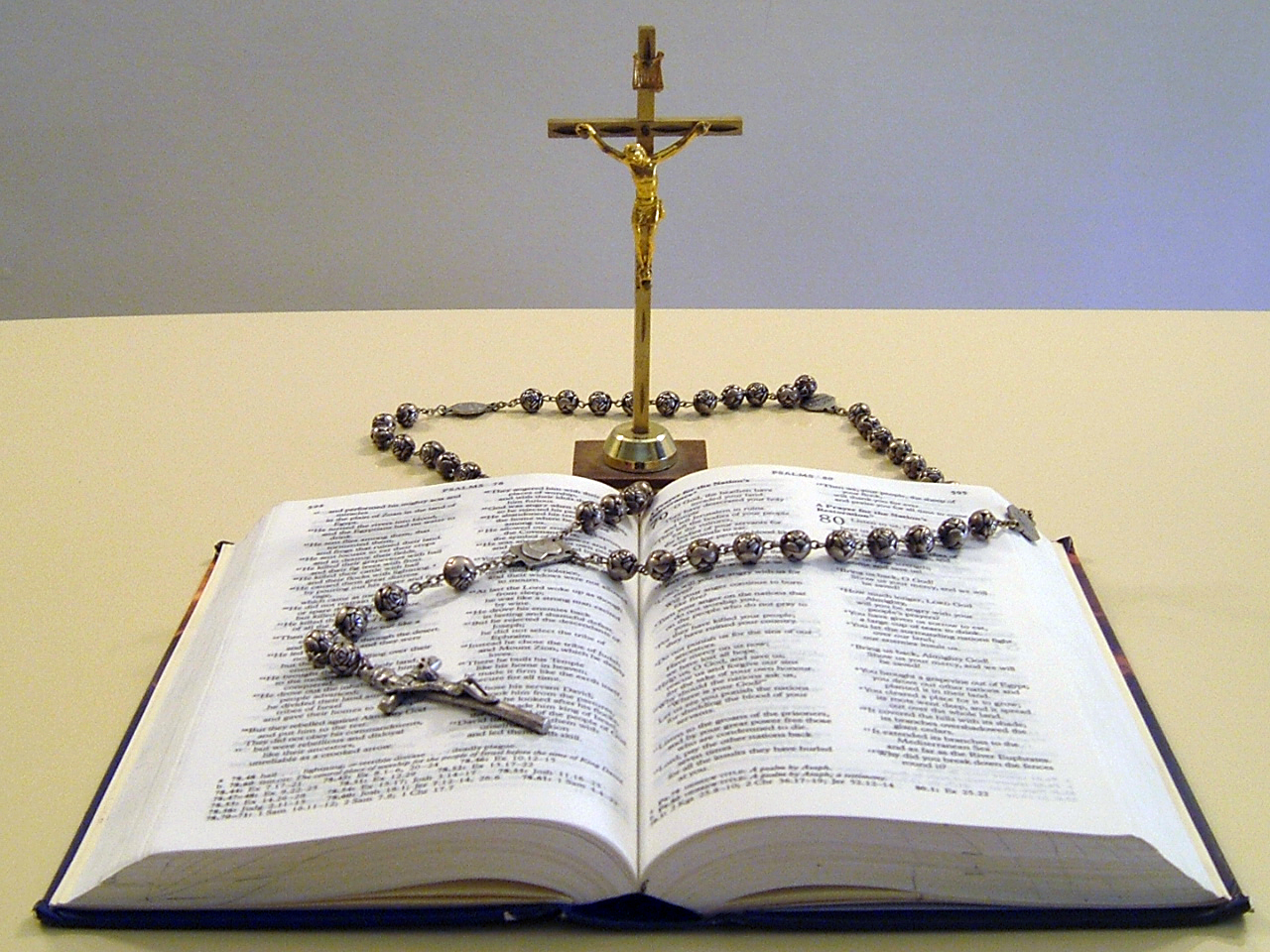
Christian culture symbols: Christian Bible, rosary, and crucifix.

A Christianophile is a person who expresses a strong interest in or appreciation for Christianity, Christian culture, Christian history, Christendom or the Christian people. That affinity may include Christianity itself or its history, philosophy, theology, music, literature, art, architecture, festivals etc. The term "Christianophile" can be contrasted with Christianophobe, someone who shows hatred or other forms of negative feelings towards all that is Christian.

Christianity and Christian culture has a generally positive image in a number of non-Christian societies such as Hong Kong, Macau, India, Japan, Lebanon, Singapore, South Korea, and Taiwan. In number of traditional Christian societies in Europe, there has been a revival of what has been called by some scholars "Christianophile", and a sympathy for Christianity and its culture, with politicians increasingly speaking of the "Christian roots and heritage" of their countries; this includes Austria, France, Hungary, Italy, Poland, Russia, Serbia, Slovakia, and the United Kingdom.

Historian Geoffrey Blainey on his book A Short History of Christianity, discussed the role of Christianity in civilization, and the extent of Christian influence on the world. Some scholars criticize the concept Eurocentrism as a "Christianophile myth" because it has favored the components (mainly Christianity) of European civilization and allowed eurocentrists to brand diverging societies and cultures as "uncivilized".

== See also ==
- Christianese
- Christian influences in Islam
- Christian values
- Culture of The Church of Jesus Christ of Latter-day Saints
- Judeo-Christian values
- Multiculturalism and Christianity
- Protestant culture
- Role of Christianity in civilization
