= Infinitesimal strain theory =

Mathematical model for describing material deformation under stress

In continuum mechanics, the infinitesimal strain theory is a mathematical approach to the description of the deformation of a solid body in which the displacements of the material particles are assumed to be much smaller (indeed, infinitesimally smaller) than any relevant dimension of the body; so that its geometry and the constitutive properties of the material (such as density and stiffness) at each point of space can be assumed to be unchanged by the deformation.

With this assumption, the equations of continuum mechanics are considerably simplified. This approach may also be called small deformation theory, small displacement theory, or small displacement-gradient theory. It is contrasted with the finite strain theory where the opposite assumption is made.

The infinitesimal strain theory has wide applications in engineering. Stress analysis, for example, tries to predict the behavior of structures built from relatively stiff elastic materials, such as concrete and steel. Such analysis can be used to minimize a structure design's deformation under typical loads. However, this approximation demands caution in the case of thin flexible bodies, such as rods, plates, and shells which are susceptible to significant rotations, thus making the results unreliable.

== Infinitesimal strain tensor ==
For infinitesimal deformations of a continuum body, in which the displacement gradient tensor (2nd order tensor) is small compared to unity, i.e. $\|\nabla \mathbf u\| \ll 1$, it is possible to perform a geometric linearization of any one of the finite strain tensors used in finite strain theory, e.g. the Lagrangian finite strain tensor $\mathbf E$, and the Eulerian finite strain tensor $\mathbf e$. In such a linearization, the non-linear or second-order terms of the finite strain tensor are neglected. Thus we have

$$\mathbf E = \frac{1}{2} \left(\nabla_{\mathbf X}\mathbf u + (\nabla_{\mathbf X}\mathbf u)^T + (\nabla_{\mathbf X}\mathbf u)^T\nabla_{\mathbf X}\mathbf u\right)\approx \frac{1}{2}\left(\nabla_{\mathbf X}\mathbf u + (\nabla_{\mathbf X}\mathbf u)^T\right)$$
or
$$E_{KL}= \frac{1}{2} \left(\frac{\partial U_K}{\partial X_L} +\frac{\partial U_L}{\partial X_K}+ \frac{\partial U_M}{\partial X_K} \frac{\partial U_M}{\partial X_L}\right)\approx \frac{1}{2}\left(\frac{\partial U_K}{\partial X_L}+\frac{\partial U_L}{\partial X_K}\right)$$
and
$$\mathbf e =\frac{1}{2} \left(\nabla_{\mathbf x}\mathbf u + (\nabla_{\mathbf x}\mathbf u)^T - \nabla_{\mathbf x}\mathbf u(\nabla_{\mathbf x}\mathbf u)^T\right)\approx \frac{1}{2}\left(\nabla_{\mathbf x}\mathbf u + (\nabla_{\mathbf x}\mathbf u)^T\right)$$
or
$$e_{rs}=\frac{1}{2} \left(\frac{\partial u_r}{\partial x_s} +\frac{\partial u_s}{\partial x_r} -\frac{\partial u_k}{\partial x_r} \frac{\partial u_k}{\partial x_s}\right)\approx \frac{1}{2}\left(\frac{\partial u_r}{\partial x_s} +\frac{\partial u_s}{\partial x_r}\right)$$

This linearization implies that the Lagrangian description and the Eulerian description are approximately the same as there is little difference in the material and spatial coordinates of a given material point in the continuum. Therefore, the material displacement gradient tensor components and the spatial displacement gradient tensor components are approximately equal. Thus we have
$$\mathbf E \approx \mathbf e \approx \boldsymbol \varepsilon = \frac{1}{2}\left((\nabla\mathbf u)^T + \nabla\mathbf u\right)$$
or
$$E_{KL}\approx e_{rs}\approx\varepsilon_{ij} = \frac{1}{2} \left(u_{i,j}+u_{j,i}\right)$$
where $\varepsilon_{ij}$ are the components of the infinitesimal strain tensor $\boldsymbol \varepsilon$, also called Cauchy's strain tensor, linear strain tensor, or small strain tensor.

$$\begin{align}
\varepsilon_{ij} &= \frac{1}{2}\left(u_{i,j}+u_{j,i}\right)  \\
&=
\begin{bmatrix}
\varepsilon_{11} & \varepsilon_{12} & \varepsilon_{13} \\
\varepsilon_{21} & \varepsilon_{22} & \varepsilon_{23} \\
\varepsilon_{31} & \varepsilon_{32} & \varepsilon_{33} \\
\end{bmatrix} \\
&=
\begin{bmatrix}
\frac{\partial u_1}{\partial x_1} & \frac{1}{2} \left(\frac{\partial u_1}{\partial x_2}+\frac{\partial u_2}{\partial x_1}\right) & \frac{1}{2} \left(\frac{\partial u_1}{\partial x_3}+\frac{\partial u_3}{\partial x_1}\right) \\
\frac{1}{2} \left(\frac{\partial u_2}{\partial x_1}+\frac{\partial u_1}{\partial x_2}\right) & \frac{\partial u_2}{\partial x_2} & \frac{1}{2} \left(\frac{\partial u_2}{\partial x_3}+\frac{\partial u_3}{\partial x_2}\right) \\
\frac{1}{2} \left(\frac{\partial u_3}{\partial x_1}+\frac{\partial u_1}{\partial x_3}\right) & \frac{1}{2} \left(\frac{\partial u_3}{\partial x_2}+\frac{\partial u_2}{\partial x_3}\right) & \frac{\partial u_3}{\partial x_3} \\
\end{bmatrix}
\end{align}$$
or using different notation:
$$\begin{bmatrix}
\varepsilon_{xx} & \varepsilon_{xy} & \varepsilon_{xz} \\
\varepsilon_{yx} & \varepsilon_{yy} & \varepsilon_{yz} \\
\varepsilon_{zx} & \varepsilon_{zy} & \varepsilon_{zz} \\
\end{bmatrix}
=
\begin{bmatrix}
\frac{\partial u_x}{\partial x} & \frac{1}{2} \left(\frac{\partial u_x}{\partial y}+\frac{\partial u_y}{\partial x}\right) & \frac{1}{2} \left(\frac{\partial u_x}{\partial z}+\frac{\partial u_z}{\partial x}\right) \\
\frac{1}{2} \left(\frac{\partial u_y}{\partial x}+\frac{\partial u_x}{\partial y}\right) & \frac{\partial u_y}{\partial y} & \frac{1}{2} \left(\frac{\partial u_y}{\partial z}+\frac{\partial u_z}{\partial y}\right) \\
\frac{1}{2} \left(\frac{\partial u_z}{\partial x}+\frac{\partial u_x}{\partial z}\right) & \frac{1}{2} \left(\frac{\partial u_z}{\partial y}+\frac{\partial u_y}{\partial z}\right) & \frac{\partial u_z}{\partial z} \\
\end{bmatrix}$$

Furthermore, since the deformation gradient can be expressed as $\boldsymbol{F} = \boldsymbol{\nabla}\mathbf{u} + \boldsymbol{I}$ where $\boldsymbol{I}$ is the second-order identity tensor, we have
$$\boldsymbol\varepsilon = \frac{1}{2} \left(\boldsymbol{F}^T+\boldsymbol{F}\right)-\boldsymbol{I}$$

Also, from the general expression for the Lagrangian and Eulerian finite strain tensors we have
$$\begin{align}
\mathbf E_{(m)}& =\frac{1}{2m} (\mathbf U^{2m}-\boldsymbol{I}) = \frac{1}{2m} [(\boldsymbol{F}^T\boldsymbol{F})^m - \boldsymbol{I}] \approx \frac{1}{2m} [\{\boldsymbol{\nabla}\mathbf{u}+(\boldsymbol{\nabla}\mathbf{u})^T + \boldsymbol{I}\}^m - \boldsymbol{I}]\approx \boldsymbol{\varepsilon}\\
\mathbf e_{(m)}& = \frac{1}{2m} (\mathbf V^{2m}-\boldsymbol{I})= \frac{1}{2m} [(\boldsymbol{F}\boldsymbol{F}^T)^m - \boldsymbol{I}]\approx \boldsymbol{\varepsilon}
\end{align}$$

=== Geometric derivation ===
Figure 1. Two-dimensional geometric deformation of an infinitesimal material element.

Consider a two-dimensional deformation of an infinitesimal rectangular material element with dimensions $dx$ by $dy$ (Figure 1), which after deformation, takes the form of a rhombus. From the geometry of Figure 1 we have

$$\begin{align}
\overline {ab} &= \sqrt{\left(dx+\frac{\partial u_x}{\partial x}dx \right)^2 + \left( \frac{\partial u_y}{\partial x}dx \right)^2} \\
&= dx\sqrt{1+2\frac{\partial u_x}{\partial x}+\left(\frac{\partial u_x}{\partial x}\right)^2 + \left(\frac{\partial u_y}{\partial x}\right)^2} \\
\end{align}$$

For very small displacement gradients, i.e., $\|\nabla \mathbf u\| \ll 1$, we have
$$\overline {ab} \approx dx + \frac{\partial u_x}{\partial x} dx$$

The normal strain in the $x$-direction of the rectangular element is defined by
$$\varepsilon_x = \frac{\overline {ab}-\overline {AB}}{\overline {AB}}$$
and knowing that $\overline {AB}= dx$, we have
$$\varepsilon_x = \frac{\partial u_x}{\partial x}$$

Similarly, the normal strain in the $y$-direction, and $z$-direction, becomes
$$\varepsilon_y = \frac{\partial u_y}{\partial y} \quad , \qquad  \varepsilon_z = \frac{\partial u_z}{\partial z}$$

The engineering shear strain, or the change in angle between two originally orthogonal material lines, in this case line $\overline {AC}$ and $\overline {AB}$, is defined as
$$\gamma_{xy}= \alpha + \beta$$

From the geometry of Figure 1 we have
$$\tan \alpha = \frac{\dfrac{\partial u_y}{\partial x}dx}{dx + \dfrac{\partial u_x}{\partial x} dx} = \frac{\dfrac{\partial u_y}{\partial x}}{1+\dfrac{\partial u_x}{\partial x}} \quad , \qquad \tan \beta=\frac{\dfrac{\partial u_x}{\partial y} dy}{dy+\dfrac{\partial u_y}{\partial y} dy}=\frac{\dfrac{\partial u_x}{\partial y}}{1+\dfrac{\partial u_y}{\partial y}}$$

For small rotations, i.e., $\alpha$ and $\beta$ are $\ll 1$ we have
$$\tan \alpha \approx \alpha \quad , \qquad \tan \beta \approx \beta$$
and, again, for small displacement gradients, we have
$$\alpha=\frac{\partial u_y}{\partial x} \quad , \qquad \beta=\frac{\partial u_x}{\partial y}$$
thus
$$\gamma_{xy}= \alpha + \beta = \frac{\partial u_y}{\partial x} + \frac{\partial u_x}{\partial y}$$
By interchanging $x$ and $y$ and $u_x$ and $u_y$, it can be shown that $\gamma_{xy} = \gamma_{yx}$.

Similarly, for the $y$-$z$ and $x$-$z$ planes, we have
$$\gamma_{yz} = \gamma_{zy} = \frac{\partial u_y}{\partial z} + \frac{\partial u_z}{\partial y} \quad , \qquad \gamma_{zx} = \gamma_{xz} = \frac{\partial u_z}{\partial x} + \frac{\partial u_x}{\partial z}$$

It can be seen that the tensorial shear strain components of the infinitesimal strain tensor can then be expressed using the engineering strain definition, $\gamma$, as
$$\begin{bmatrix}
\varepsilon_{xx} & \varepsilon_{xy} & \varepsilon_{xz} \\
\varepsilon_{yx} & \varepsilon_{yy} & \varepsilon_{yz} \\
\varepsilon_{zx} & \varepsilon_{zy} & \varepsilon_{zz} \\
\end{bmatrix} = \begin{bmatrix}
\varepsilon_{xx} & \gamma_{xy}/2 & \gamma_{xz}/2 \\
\gamma_{yx}/2 & \varepsilon_{yy} & \gamma_{yz}/2 \\
\gamma_{zx}/2 & \gamma_{zy}/2 & \varepsilon_{zz} \\
\end{bmatrix}$$

=== Physical interpretation ===
From finite strain theory we have
$$d\mathbf{x}^2 - d\mathbf{X}^2 = d\mathbf X \cdot 2\mathbf E \cdot d\mathbf X \quad\text{or}\quad (dx)^2 - (dX)^2 = 2E_{KL}\,dX_K\,dX_L$$

For infinitesimal strains then we have
$$d\mathbf{x}^2 - d\mathbf{X}^2 = d\mathbf X \cdot 2\mathbf{\boldsymbol \varepsilon} \cdot d\mathbf X \quad\text{or}\quad (dx)^2 - (dX)^2 = 2\varepsilon_{KL}\,dX_K\,dX_L$$

Dividing by $(dX)^2$ we have
$$\frac{dx-dX}{dX}\frac{dx+dX}{dX}=2\varepsilon_{ij}\frac{dX_i}{dX}\frac{dX_j}{dX}$$

For small deformations we assume that $dx \approx dX$, thus the second term of the left hand side becomes: $\frac{dx+dX}{dX} \approx 2$.

Then we have
$$\frac{dx-dX}{dX} = \varepsilon_{ij}N_iN_j = \mathbf N \cdot \boldsymbol \varepsilon \cdot \mathbf N$$
where $N_i=\frac{dX_i}{dX}$, is the unit vector in the direction of $d\mathbf X$, and the left-hand-side expression is the normal strain $e_{(\mathbf N)}$ in the direction of $\mathbf N$. For the particular case of $\mathbf N$ in the $X_1$ direction, i.e., $\mathbf N = \mathbf I_1$, we have
$$e_{(\mathbf I_1)}=\mathbf I_1 \cdot \boldsymbol \varepsilon \cdot \mathbf I_1 = \varepsilon_{11}.$$

Similarly, for $\mathbf N=\mathbf I_2$ and $\mathbf N=\mathbf I_3$ we can find the normal strains $\varepsilon_{22}$ and $\varepsilon_{33}$, respectively. Therefore, the diagonal elements of the infinitesimal strain tensor are the normal strains in the coordinate directions.

=== Strain transformation rules ===
If we choose an orthonormal coordinate system ($\mathbf{e}_1,\mathbf{e}_2,\mathbf{e}_3$) we can write the tensor in terms of components with respect to those base vectors as
$$\boldsymbol{\varepsilon} = \sum_{i=1}^3 \sum_{j=1}^3 \varepsilon_{ij} \mathbf{e}_i\otimes\mathbf{e}_j$$
In matrix form,
$$\underline{\underline{\boldsymbol{\varepsilon}}} = \begin{bmatrix}
\varepsilon_{11} & \varepsilon_{12} & \varepsilon_{13} \\
\varepsilon_{12} & \varepsilon_{22} & \varepsilon_{23} \\
\varepsilon_{13} & \varepsilon_{23} & \varepsilon_{33}
\end{bmatrix}$$
We can easily choose to use another orthonormal coordinate system ($\hat{\mathbf{e}}_1,\hat{\mathbf{e}}_2,\hat{\mathbf{e}}_3$) instead. In that case the components of the tensor are different, say
$$\boldsymbol{\varepsilon} = \sum_{i=1}^3 \sum_{j=1}^3 \hat{\varepsilon}_{ij} \hat{\mathbf{e}}_i\otimes\hat{\mathbf{e}}_j \quad \implies \quad \underline{\underline{\hat{\boldsymbol{\varepsilon}}}} = \begin{bmatrix}
\hat{\varepsilon}_{11} & \hat{\varepsilon}_{12} & \hat{\varepsilon}_{13} \\
\hat{\varepsilon}_{12} & \hat{\varepsilon}_{22} & \hat{\varepsilon}_{23} \\
\hat{\varepsilon}_{13} & \hat{\varepsilon}_{23} & \hat{\varepsilon}_{33}
\end{bmatrix}$$
The components of the strain in the two coordinate systems are related by
$$\hat{\varepsilon}_{ij} = \ell_{ip}~\ell_{jq}~\varepsilon_{pq}$$
where the Einstein summation convention for repeated indices has been used and $\ell_{ij} = \hat{\mathbf{e}}_i\cdot{\mathbf{e}}_j$. In matrix form
$$\underline{\underline{\hat{\boldsymbol{\varepsilon}}}} = \underline{\underline{\mathbf{L}}} ~\underline{\underline{\boldsymbol{\varepsilon}}}~ \underline{\underline{\mathbf{L}}}^T$$
or
$$\begin{bmatrix}
\hat{\varepsilon}_{11} & \hat{\varepsilon}_{12} & \hat{\varepsilon}_{13} \\
\hat{\varepsilon}_{21} & \hat{\varepsilon}_{22} & \hat{\varepsilon}_{23} \\
\hat{\varepsilon}_{31} & \hat{\varepsilon}_{32} & \hat{\varepsilon}_{33}
\end{bmatrix}
= \begin{bmatrix}
\ell_{11} & \ell_{12} & \ell_{13} \\
\ell_{21} & \ell_{22} & \ell_{23} \\
\ell_{31} & \ell_{32} & \ell_{33}
\end{bmatrix}
\begin{bmatrix}
\varepsilon_{11} & \varepsilon_{12} & \varepsilon_{13} \\
\varepsilon_{21} & \varepsilon_{22} & \varepsilon_{23} \\
\varepsilon_{31} & \varepsilon_{32} & \varepsilon_{33}
\end{bmatrix}
\begin{bmatrix}
\ell_{11} & \ell_{12} & \ell_{13} \\
\ell_{21} & \ell_{22} & \ell_{23} \\
\ell_{31} & \ell_{32} & \ell_{33}
\end{bmatrix}^T$$

=== Strain invariants ===
Certain operations on the strain tensor give the same result without regard to which orthonormal coordinate system is used to represent the components of strain. The results of these operations are called strain invariants. The most commonly used strain invariants are
$$\begin{align}
I_1 & = \mathrm{tr}(\boldsymbol{\varepsilon}) \\
I_2 & = \tfrac{1}{2}\{[\mathrm{tr}(\boldsymbol{\varepsilon})]^2 - \mathrm{tr}(\boldsymbol{\varepsilon}^2)\} \\
I_3 & = \det(\boldsymbol{\varepsilon})
\end{align}$$
In terms of components
$$\begin{align}
I_1 & = \varepsilon_{11} + \varepsilon_{22} + \varepsilon_{33} \\
I_2 & = \varepsilon_{11}\varepsilon_{22} + \varepsilon_{22}\varepsilon_{33} + \varepsilon_{33}\varepsilon_{11} - \varepsilon_{12}^2 - \varepsilon_{23}^2 - \varepsilon_{31}^2 \\
I_3 & = \varepsilon_{11}(\varepsilon_{22}\varepsilon_{33} - \varepsilon_{23}^2) - \varepsilon_{12}(\varepsilon_{21}\varepsilon_{33}-\varepsilon_{23}\varepsilon_{31}) + \varepsilon_{13}(\varepsilon_{21}\varepsilon_{32}-\varepsilon_{22}\varepsilon_{31})
\end{align}$$

=== Principal strains ===
It can be shown that it is possible to find a coordinate system ($\mathbf{n}_1,\mathbf{n}_2,\mathbf{n}_3$) in which the components of the strain tensor are
$$\underline{\underline{\boldsymbol{\varepsilon}}} = \begin{bmatrix} \varepsilon_{1} & 0 & 0 \\
0 & \varepsilon_{2} & 0 \\
0 & 0 & \varepsilon_{3} \end{bmatrix} \quad \implies \quad \boldsymbol{\varepsilon} = \varepsilon_{1} \mathbf{n}_1\otimes\mathbf{n}_1 + \varepsilon_{2} \mathbf{n}_2\otimes\mathbf{n}_2 + \varepsilon_{3} \mathbf{n}_3\otimes\mathbf{n}_3$$
The components of the strain tensor in the ($\mathbf{n}_1,\mathbf{n}_2,\mathbf{n}_3$) coordinate system are called the principal strains and the directions $\mathbf{n}_i$ are called the directions of principal strain. Since there are no shear strain components in this coordinate system, the principal strains represent the maximum and minimum stretches of an elemental volume.

If we are given the components of the strain tensor in an arbitrary orthonormal coordinate system, we can find the principal strains using an eigenvalue decomposition determined by solving the system of equations
$$(\underline{\underline{\boldsymbol{\varepsilon}}} - \varepsilon_i~\underline{\underline{\mathbf{I}}})~\mathbf{n}_i = \underline{\mathbf{0}}$$
This system of equations is equivalent to finding the vector $\mathbf{n}_i$ along which the strain tensor becomes a pure stretch with no shear component.

=== Volumetric strain ===
The volumetric strain, also called bulk strain, is the relative variation of the volume, as arising from dilation or compression; it is the first strain invariant or trace of the tensor:
$$\delta=\frac{\Delta V}{V_0} = I_1 = \varepsilon_{11} + \varepsilon_{22} + \varepsilon_{33}$$
Actually, if we consider a cube with an edge length a, it is a quasi-cube after the deformation (the variations of the angles do not change the volume) with the dimensions $a \cdot (1 + \varepsilon_{11}) \times a \cdot (1 + \varepsilon_{22}) \times a \cdot (1 + \varepsilon_{33})$ and V_{0} = a^{3}, thus
$$\frac{\Delta V}{V_0} = \frac{\left ( 1 + \varepsilon_{11} + \varepsilon_{22} + \varepsilon_{33} + \varepsilon_{11} \cdot \varepsilon_{22} + \varepsilon_{11} \cdot \varepsilon_{33}+ \varepsilon_{22} \cdot \varepsilon_{33} + \varepsilon_{11} \cdot \varepsilon_{22} \cdot \varepsilon_{33} \right ) \cdot a^3 - a^3}{a^3}$$
as we consider small deformations,
$$1 \gg \varepsilon_{ii} \gg \varepsilon_{ii} \cdot \varepsilon_{jj} \gg \varepsilon_{11} \cdot \varepsilon_{22} \cdot \varepsilon_{33}$$
therefore the formula.

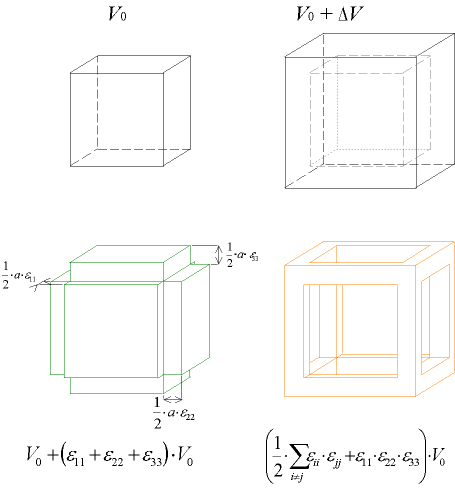

In case of pure shear, we can see that there is no change of the volume.

=== Strain deviator tensor ===
The infinitesimal strain tensor $\varepsilon_{ij}$, similarly to the Cauchy stress tensor, can be expressed as the sum of two other tensors:

1. a mean strain tensor or volumetric strain tensor or spherical strain tensor, $\varepsilon_M\delta_{ij}$, related to dilation or volume change; and
2. a deviatoric component called the strain deviator tensor, $\varepsilon'_{ij}$, related to distortion.

$$\varepsilon_{ij}= \varepsilon'_{ij} + \varepsilon_M\delta_{ij}$$
where $\varepsilon_M$ is the mean strain given by
$$\varepsilon_M = \frac{\varepsilon_{kk}}{3} = \frac{\varepsilon_{11} + \varepsilon_{22} + \varepsilon_{33}}{3} = \tfrac{1}{3}I^e_1$$

The deviatoric strain tensor can be obtained by subtracting the mean strain tensor from the infinitesimal strain tensor:
$$\begin{align}
\ \varepsilon'_{ij} &= \varepsilon_{ij} - \frac{\varepsilon_{kk}}{3}\delta_{ij} \\
\begin{bmatrix}
\varepsilon'_{11} & \varepsilon'_{12} & \varepsilon'_{13} \\
\varepsilon'_{21} & \varepsilon'_{22} & \varepsilon'_{23} \\
\varepsilon'_{31} & \varepsilon'_{32} & \varepsilon'_{33} \\
\end{bmatrix}
&=\begin{bmatrix}
\varepsilon_{11} & \varepsilon_{12} & \varepsilon_{13} \\
\varepsilon_{21} & \varepsilon_{22} & \varepsilon_{23} \\
\varepsilon_{31} & \varepsilon_{32} & \varepsilon_{33} \\
\end{bmatrix}
- \begin{bmatrix}
\varepsilon_M & 0 & 0 \\
0 & \varepsilon_M & 0 \\
0 & 0 & \varepsilon_M \\
\end{bmatrix} \\
&=\begin{bmatrix}
\varepsilon_{11}-\varepsilon_M & \varepsilon_{12} & \varepsilon_{13} \\
\varepsilon_{21} & \varepsilon_{22}-\varepsilon_M & \varepsilon_{23} \\
\varepsilon_{31} & \varepsilon_{32} & \varepsilon_{33}-\varepsilon_M \\
\end{bmatrix} \\
\end{align}$$

=== Octahedral strains ===
Let ($\mathbf{n}_1, \mathbf{n}_2, \mathbf{n}_3$) be the directions of the three principal strains. An octahedral plane is one whose normal makes equal angles with the three principal directions. The engineering shear strain on an octahedral plane is called the octahedral shear strain and is given by
$$\gamma_{\mathrm{oct}} = \tfrac{2}{3}\sqrt{(\varepsilon_1-\varepsilon_2)^2 + (\varepsilon_2-\varepsilon_3)^2 + (\varepsilon_3-\varepsilon_1)^2}$$
where $\varepsilon_1, \varepsilon_2, \varepsilon_3$ are the principal strains.

The normal strain on an octahedral plane is given by
$$\varepsilon_{\mathrm{oct}} = \tfrac{1}{3}(\varepsilon_1 + \varepsilon_2 + \varepsilon_3)$$

=== Equivalent strain ===
A scalar quantity called the equivalent strain, or the von Mises equivalent strain, is often used to describe the state of strain in solids. Several definitions of equivalent strain can be found in the literature. A definition that is commonly used in the literature on plasticity is
$$\varepsilon_{\mathrm{eq}} = \sqrt{\tfrac{2}{3} \boldsymbol{\varepsilon}^{\mathrm{dev}}:\boldsymbol{\varepsilon}^{\mathrm{dev}}}  = \sqrt{\tfrac{2}{3}\varepsilon_{ij}^{\mathrm{dev}}\varepsilon_{ij}^{\mathrm{dev}}}
~;~~ \boldsymbol{\varepsilon}^{\mathrm{dev}} = \boldsymbol{\varepsilon} - \tfrac{1}{3}\mathrm{tr}(\boldsymbol{\varepsilon})~\boldsymbol{I}$$
This quantity is work conjugate to the equivalent stress defined as
$$\sigma_{\mathrm{eq}} = \sqrt{\tfrac{3}{2} \boldsymbol{\sigma}^{\mathrm{dev}}:\boldsymbol{\sigma}^{\mathrm{dev}}}$$

== Compatibility equations ==
For prescribed strain components $\varepsilon_{ij}$ the strain tensor equation $u_{i,j}+u_{j,i}= 2 \varepsilon_{ij}$ represents a system of six differential equations for the determination of three displacements components $u_i$, giving an over-determined system. Thus, a solution does not generally exist for an arbitrary choice of strain components. Therefore, some restrictions, named compatibility equations, are imposed upon the strain components. With the addition of the three compatibility equations the number of independent equations are reduced to three, matching the number of unknown displacement components. These constraints on the strain tensor were discovered by Saint-Venant, and are called the "Saint Venant compatibility equations".

The compatibility functions serve to assure a single-valued continuous displacement function $u_i$. If the elastic medium is visualised as a set of infinitesimal cubes in the unstrained state, after the medium is strained, an arbitrary strain tensor may not yield a situation in which the distorted cubes still fit together without overlapping.

In index notation, the compatibility equations are expressed as
$$\varepsilon_{ij,km}+\varepsilon_{km,ij}-\varepsilon_{ik,jm}-\varepsilon_{jm,ik}=0$$

In engineering notation,

- $\frac{\partial^2 \epsilon_x}{\partial y^2} + \frac{\partial^2 \epsilon_y}{\partial x^2} = 2 \frac{\partial^2 \epsilon_{xy}}{\partial x \partial y}$
- $\frac{\partial^2 \epsilon_y}{\partial z^2} + \frac{\partial^2 \epsilon_z}{\partial y^2} = 2 \frac{\partial^2 \epsilon_{yz}}{\partial y \partial z}$
- $\frac{\partial^2 \epsilon_x}{\partial z^2} + \frac{\partial^2 \epsilon_z}{\partial x^2} = 2 \frac{\partial^2 \epsilon_{zx}}{\partial z \partial x}$
- $\frac{\partial^2 \epsilon_x}{\partial y \partial z} = \frac{\partial}{\partial x} \left ( -\frac{\partial \epsilon_{yz}}{\partial x} + \frac{\partial \epsilon_{zx}}{\partial y} + \frac{\partial \epsilon_{xy}}{\partial z}\right)$
- $\frac{\partial^2 \epsilon_y}{\partial z \partial x} = \frac{\partial}{\partial y} \left ( \frac{\partial \epsilon_{yz}}{\partial x} - \frac{\partial \epsilon_{zx}}{\partial y} + \frac{\partial \epsilon_{xy}}{\partial z}\right)$
- $\frac{\partial^2 \epsilon_z}{\partial x \partial y} = \frac{\partial}{\partial z} \left ( \frac{\partial \epsilon_{yz}}{\partial x} + \frac{\partial \epsilon_{zx}}{\partial y} - \frac{\partial \epsilon_{xy}}{\partial z}\right)$

== Special cases ==
=== Plane strain ===
Plane strain state in a continuum.

In real engineering components, stress (and strain) are 3-D tensors but in prismatic structures such as a long metal billet, the length of the structure is much greater than the other two dimensions. The strains associated with length, i.e., the normal strain $\varepsilon_{33}$ and the shear strains $\varepsilon_{13}$ and $\varepsilon_{23}$ (if the length is the 3-direction) are constrained by nearby material and are small compared to the cross-sectional strains. Plane strain is then an acceptable approximation. The strain tensor for plane strain is written as:
$$\underline{\underline{\boldsymbol{\varepsilon}}} = \begin{bmatrix}
\varepsilon_{11} & \varepsilon_{12} & 0 \\
\varepsilon_{21} & \varepsilon_{22} & 0 \\
0      &     0       & 0
\end{bmatrix}$$
in which the double underline indicates a second order tensor. This strain state is called plane strain. The corresponding stress tensor is:
$$\underline{\underline{\boldsymbol{\sigma}}} = \begin{bmatrix}
\sigma_{11} & \sigma_{12} & 0 \\
\sigma_{21} & \sigma_{22} & 0 \\
0      &     0       & \sigma_{33}
\end{bmatrix}$$
in which the non-zero $\sigma_{33}$ is needed to maintain the constraint $\epsilon_{33} = 0$. This stress term can be temporarily removed from the analysis to leave only the in-plane terms, effectively reducing the 3-D problem to a much simpler 2-D problem.

=== Antiplane strain ===
Antiplane strain is another special state of strain that can occur in a body, for instance in a region close to a screw dislocation. The strain tensor for antiplane strain is given by
$$\underline{\underline{\boldsymbol{\varepsilon}}} = \begin{bmatrix}
0 & 0 & \varepsilon_{13} \\
0 & 0 & \varepsilon_{23}\\
\varepsilon_{13} & \varepsilon_{23} & 0
\end{bmatrix}$$

== Relation to infinitesimal rotation tensor ==
The infinitesimal strain tensor is defined as
$$\boldsymbol{\varepsilon} = \frac{1}{2} [\boldsymbol{\nabla}\mathbf{u} + (\boldsymbol{\nabla}\mathbf{u})^T]$$
Therefore the displacement gradient can be expressed as
$$\boldsymbol{\nabla}\mathbf{u} = \boldsymbol{\varepsilon} + \boldsymbol{W}$$
where
$$\boldsymbol{W} := \frac{1}{2} [\boldsymbol{\nabla}\mathbf{u} - (\boldsymbol{\nabla}\mathbf{u})^T]$$
The quantity $\boldsymbol{W}$ is the infinitesimal rotation tensor or infinitesimal angular displacement tensor (related to the infinitesimal rotation matrix). This tensor is skew symmetric. For infinitesimal deformations the scalar components of $\boldsymbol{W}$ satisfy the condition $|W_{ij}| \ll 1$. Note that the displacement gradient is small only if both the strain tensor and the rotation tensor are infinitesimal.

=== The axial vector ===
A skew symmetric second-order tensor has three independent scalar components. These three components are used to define an axial vector, $\mathbf{w}$, as follows
$$W_{ij} = -\epsilon_{ijk}~w_k ~;~~ w_i = -\tfrac{1}{2}~\epsilon_{ijk}~W_{jk}$$
where $\epsilon_{ijk}$ is the permutation symbol. In matrix form
$$\underline{\underline{\boldsymbol{W}}} = \begin{bmatrix} 0 & -w_3 & w_2 \\ w_3 & 0 & -w_1 \\ -w_2 & w_1 & 0\end{bmatrix} ~;~~ \underline{\mathbf{w}} = \begin{bmatrix} w_1 \\ w_2 \\ w_3 \end{bmatrix}$$
The axial vector is also called the infinitesimal rotation vector. The rotation vector is related to the displacement gradient by the relation
$$\mathbf{w} = \tfrac{1}{2}~ \boldsymbol{\nabla} \times \mathbf{u}$$
In index notation
$$w_i = \tfrac{1}{2}~\epsilon_{ijk}~u_{k,j}$$
If $\lVert\boldsymbol{W}\rVert \ll 1$ and $\boldsymbol{\varepsilon} = \boldsymbol{0}$ then the material undergoes an approximate rigid body rotation of magnitude $|\mathbf{w}|$ around the vector $\mathbf{w}$.

=== Relation between the strain tensor and the rotation vector ===
Given a continuous, single-valued displacement field $\mathbf{u}$ and the corresponding infinitesimal strain tensor $\boldsymbol{\varepsilon}$, we have (see Tensor derivative (continuum mechanics))
$$\boldsymbol{\nabla}\times\boldsymbol{\varepsilon} = e_{ijk}~\varepsilon_{lj,i}~\mathbf{e}_k\otimes\mathbf{e}_l
= \tfrac{1}{2}~e_{ijk}~[u_{l,ji} + u_{j,li}]~\mathbf{e}_k\otimes\mathbf{e}_l$$
Since a change in the order of differentiation does not change the result, $u_{l,ji} = u_{l,ij}$. Therefore
$$e_{ijk} u_{l,ji} = (e_{12k}+e_{21k}) u_{l,12} + (e_{13k}+e_{31k}) u_{l,13} + (e_{23k} + e_{32k}) u_{l,32} = 0$$
Also
$$\tfrac{1}{2}~e_{ijk}~u_{j,li} = \left(\tfrac{1}{2}~e_{ijk}~u_{j,i}\right)_{,l} = \left(\tfrac{1}{2} ~ e_{kij}~u_{j,i}\right)_{,l} = w_{k,l}$$
Hence
$$\boldsymbol{\nabla} \times \boldsymbol{\varepsilon} = w_{k,l}~\mathbf{e}_k\otimes\mathbf{e}_l = \boldsymbol{\nabla}\mathbf{w}$$

=== Relation between rotation tensor and rotation vector ===
From an important identity regarding the curl of a tensor we know that for a continuous, single-valued displacement field $\mathbf{u}$,
$$\boldsymbol{\nabla}\times(\boldsymbol{\nabla}\mathbf{u}) = \boldsymbol{0}.$$
Since $\boldsymbol{\nabla}\mathbf{u} = \boldsymbol{\varepsilon} + \boldsymbol{W}$ we have
$$\boldsymbol{\nabla}\times\boldsymbol{W} = -\boldsymbol{\nabla}\times\boldsymbol{\varepsilon} = - \boldsymbol{\nabla} \mathbf{w}.$$

== Strain tensor in non-Cartesian coordinates ==
=== Strain tensor in cylindrical coordinates ===
In cylindrical polar coordinates ($r, \theta, z$), the displacement vector can be written as
$$\mathbf{u} = u_r~\mathbf{e}_r + u_\theta~\mathbf{e}_\theta + u_z~\mathbf{e}_z$$
The components of the strain tensor in a cylindrical coordinate system are given by:
$$\begin{align}
\varepsilon_{rr} & = \cfrac{\partial u_r}{\partial r} \\
\varepsilon_{\theta\theta} & = \cfrac{1}{r}\left(\cfrac{\partial u_\theta}{\partial \theta} + u_r\right) \\
\varepsilon_{zz} & = \cfrac{\partial u_z}{\partial z} \\
\varepsilon_{r\theta} & = \cfrac{1}{2} \left(\cfrac{1}{r}\cfrac{\partial u_r}{\partial \theta} + \cfrac{\partial u_\theta}{\partial r} - \cfrac{u_\theta}{r}\right) \\
\varepsilon_{\theta z} & = \cfrac{1}{2} \left(\cfrac{\partial u_\theta}{\partial z} + \cfrac{1}{r} \cfrac{\partial u_z}{\partial \theta}\right) \\
\varepsilon_{zr} & = \cfrac{1}{2} \left(\cfrac{\partial u_r}{\partial z} + \cfrac{\partial u_z}{\partial r}\right)
\end{align}$$

=== Strain tensor in spherical coordinates ===
Spherical coordinates (r, θ, φ) as commonly used in physics: radial distance r, polar angle θ (theta), and azimuthal angle φ (phi). The symbol ρ (rho) is often used instead of r.

In spherical coordinates ($r, \theta, \phi$), the displacement vector can be written as
$$\mathbf{u} = u_r~\mathbf{e}_r + u_\theta~\mathbf{e}_\theta + u_\phi~\mathbf{e}_\phi$$
The components of the strain tensor in a spherical coordinate system are given by
$$\begin{align}
\varepsilon_{rr} & = \cfrac{\partial u_r}{\partial r} \\
\varepsilon_{\theta\theta} & = \cfrac{1}{r}\left(\cfrac{\partial u_\theta}{\partial \theta} + u_r\right) \\
\varepsilon_{\phi\phi} & = \cfrac{1}{r\sin\theta}\left(\cfrac{\partial u_\phi}{\partial \phi} + u_r\sin\theta + u_\theta\cos\theta\right)\\
\varepsilon_{r\theta} & = \cfrac{1}{2}\left(\cfrac{1}{r}\cfrac{\partial u_r}{\partial \theta} + \cfrac{\partial u_\theta}{\partial r}- \cfrac{u_\theta}{r}\right) \\
\varepsilon_{\theta \phi} & = \cfrac{1}{2r}\left(\cfrac{1}{\sin\theta}\cfrac{\partial u_\theta}{\partial \phi} + \cfrac{\partial u_\phi}{\partial \theta} - u_\phi\cot\theta\right) \\
\varepsilon_{\phi r} & = \cfrac{1}{2}\left(\cfrac{1}{r\sin\theta}\cfrac{\partial u_r}{\partial \phi} + \cfrac{\partial u_\phi}{\partial r} - \cfrac{u_\phi}{r}\right)
\end{align}$$

== See also ==
- Deformation (mechanics)
- Compatibility (mechanics)
- Stress tensor
- Strain gauge
- Elasticity tensor
- Stress–strain curve
- Hooke's law
- Poisson's ratio
- Finite strain theory
- Strain rate
- Plane stress
- Digital image correlation
