= Displacement field =

Displacement field may refer to:

- Displacement field (mechanics)
- Electric displacement field
