= Saint-Venant's compatibility condition =

Mathematical concept

In the mathematical theory of elasticity, Saint-Venant's compatibility condition defines the relationship between the strain $\varepsilon$ and a displacement field $\ u$ by

$$\epsilon_{ij} = \frac{1}{2} \left( \frac{\partial u_i}{\partial x_j} + \frac{\partial u_j}{\partial x_i} \right)$$

where $1\le i,j \le 3$. Barré de Saint-Venant derived the compatibility condition for an arbitrary symmetric second rank tensor field to be of this form, this has now been generalized to higher rank symmetric tensor fields on spaces of dimension $n\ge 2$

== Rank 2 tensor fields ==
For a symmetric rank 2 tensor field $F$ in n-dimensional Euclidean space ($n \ge 2$) the integrability condition takes the form of the vanishing of the Saint-Venant's tensor $W(F)$ defined by

$$W_{ijkl} = \frac{\partial^2 F_{ij}}{\partial x_k \partial x_l} +
\frac{\partial^2 F_{kl}}{\partial x_i \partial x_j} - \frac{\partial^2 F_{il}}{\partial x_j \partial x_k} -\frac{\partial^2 F_{jk}}{\partial x_i \partial x_l}$$

The result that, on a simply connected domain W=0 implies that strain is the symmetric derivative of some vector field, was first described by Barré de Saint-Venant in 1860 and proved rigorously by Beltrami in 1886. For non-simply connected domains there are finite dimensional spaces of symmetric tensors with vanishing Saint-Venant's tensor that are not the symmetric derivative of a vector field. The situation is analogous to de Rham cohomology

The Saint-Venant tensor $W$ is closely related to the Riemann curvature tensor $R_{ijkl}$. Indeed the first variation $R$ about the Euclidean metric with a perturbation in the metric $F$ is precisely $W$. Consequently the number of independent components of $W$ is the same as $R$ specifically $\frac{n^2 (n^2-1)}{12}$ for dimension n. Specifically for $n=2$, $W$ has only one independent component where as for $n=3$ there are six.

In its simplest form of course the components of $F$ must be assumed twice continuously differentiable, but more recent work proves the result in a much more general case.

== Kröner tensor and Poincaré's lemma ==
The relation between Saint-Venant's compatibility condition and Poincaré's lemma can be understood more clearly using a reduced form of $W$ the Kröner tensor

$$K_{i_1...i_{n-2}j_1...j_{n-2}} = \epsilon_{i_1...i_{n-2}kl}\epsilon_{j_1...j_{n-2}mp}F_{lm,kp}$$

where $\epsilon$ is the permutation symbol. For $n=3$, $K$ is a symmetric rank 2 tensor field. The vanishing of $K$ is equivalent to the vanishing of $W$ and this also shows that there are six independent components for the important case of three dimensions. While this still involves two derivatives rather than the one in the Poincaré lemma, it is possible to reduce to a problem involving first derivatives by introducing more variables and it has been shown that the resulting 'elasticity complex' is equivalent to the de Rham complex.

In differential geometry the symmetrized derivative of a vector field appears also as the Lie derivative of the metric tensor g with respect to the vector field.

$$T_{ij}=(\mathcal L_U g)_{ij} = U_{i;j}+U_{j;i}$$

where indices following a semicolon indicate covariant differentiation. The vanishing of $W(T)$ is thus the integrability condition for local existence of $U$ in the Euclidean case. As noted above this coincides with the vanishing of the linearization of the Riemann curvature tensor about the Euclidean metric.

== Generalization to higher rank tensors ==
Saint-Venant's compatibility condition can be thought of as an analogue, for symmetric tensor fields, of Poincaré's lemma for skew-symmetric tensor fields (differential forms). The result can be generalized to higher rank symmetric tensor fields. .Let F be a symmetric rank-k tensor field on an open set in n-dimensional Euclidean space, then the symmetric derivative is the rank k+1 tensor field defined by

$$(dF)_{i_1... i_k i_{k+1}} = F_{(i_1... i_k,i_{k+1})}$$

where we use the classical notation that indices following a comma indicate differentiation and groups of indices enclosed in brackets indicate symmetrization over those indices. The Saint-Venant tensor $W$ of a symmetric rank-k tensor field $T$ is defined by

$$W_{i_1..i_k j_1...j_k}=V_{(i_1..i_k)(j_1...j_k)}$$

with

$$V_{i_1..i_k j_1...j_k} = \sum\limits_{p=0}^{k} (-1)^p {k \choose p}  T_{i_1..i_{k-p}j_1...j_p,j_{p+1}...j_k i_{k-p+1}...i_k }$$

On a simply connected domain in Euclidean space $W=0$ implies that $T = dF$ for some rank k-1 symmetric tensor field $F$.

Denisjuk gives an invariant form of the generalized Saint-Venant tensor as a section of the bundle $S^k(\Lambda^2T^*\mathbb{R}^n)$. That is the k-th symmetric power of the second skew symmetric power of the cotangent bundle. He defines $W$ as the alternation of the m-th partial derivatives of $T$, and observes that for $m=1$ it reduces simply to the exterior derivative. This work, and Sharafutdinov's, stem from the study of the longitudinal ray transform, of symmetric tensor fields. Here the null space is exactly symmetric derivatives of tensor fields one rank lower, and the Saint-Venant tensor can be recovered by an explicit reconstruction formula.

== See also ==
- Compatibility (mechanics)
