= Longitudinal ray transform =

Integral transform

In mathematics the longitudinal ray transform (LRT) is a generalization of the X-ray transform to symmetric tensor fields

Let $f_{i_1 ... i_m}$ be the components of a symmetric rank-m tensor field ($m\ge$) on Euclidean space $\mathbf{R}^n$ ($n \ge 2$). For a unit vector $\xi, |\xi|=1$ and a point $x \in \mathbf{R}^n$ the longitudinal ray transform is defined as

$$g(x, \xi):= If(x, \xi)= \int\limits_{-\infty}^\infty f_{i_1 ... i_m}(x+ s \xi) \xi_{i_1} \cdots \xi_{i_m}\, \mathrm{d}s$$

where summation over repeated indices is implied. The transform has a null-space, assuming the components are smooth and decay at infinity any $f= dg$, the symmetrized derivative of a rank m-1 tensor field $g$, satisfies $If=0$. More generally the Saint-Venant tensor $Wf$ can be recovered uniquely by an explicit formula. For lines that pass through a curve similar results can be obtained to the case of the complete data case of all lines

Applications of the LRT include Bragg edge neutron tomography of strain, and Doppler tomography of velocity vector fields.
