= Tensor derivative (continuum mechanics) =

The derivatives of scalars, vectors, and second-order tensors with respect to second-order tensors are of considerable use in continuum mechanics. These derivatives are used in the theories of nonlinear elasticity and plasticity, particularly in the design of algorithms for numerical simulations.

The directional derivative provides a systematic way of finding these derivatives.

== Derivatives with respect to vectors and second-order tensors ==
The definitions of directional derivatives for various situations are given below. It is assumed that the functions are sufficiently smooth that derivatives can be taken.

=== Derivatives of scalar valued functions of vectors ===
Let f(v) be a real valued function of the vector v. Then the derivative of f(v) with respect to v (or at v) is the vector defined through its dot product with any vector u being

$$\frac{\partial f}{\partial \mathbf{v}}\cdot\mathbf{u} = Df(\mathbf{v})[\mathbf{u}] = \left[\frac{d}{d\alpha}~f(\mathbf{v} + \alpha~\mathbf{u})\right]_{\alpha=0}$$

for all vectors u. The above dot product yields a scalar, and if u is a unit vector gives the directional derivative of f at v, in the u direction.

Properties:

1. If $f(\mathbf{v}) = f_1(\mathbf{v}) + f_2(\mathbf{v})$ then
  $$\frac{\partial f}{\partial \mathbf{v}}\cdot\mathbf{u} = \left(\frac{\partial f_1}{\partial \mathbf{v}} + \frac{\partial f_2}{\partial \mathbf{v}}\right)\cdot\mathbf{u}$$
2. If $f(\mathbf{v}) = f_1(\mathbf{v})~ f_2(\mathbf{v})$ then
  $$\frac{\partial f}{\partial \mathbf{v}}\cdot\mathbf{u} = \left(\frac{\partial f_1}{\partial \mathbf{v}} \cdot \mathbf{u} \right)~f_2(\mathbf{v}) + f_1(\mathbf{v})~\left(\frac{\partial f_2}{\partial \mathbf{v}}\cdot\mathbf{u} \right)$$
3. If $f(\mathbf{v}) = f_1(f_2(\mathbf{v}))$ then
  $$\frac{\partial f}{\partial \mathbf{v}}\cdot\mathbf{u} = \frac{\partial f_1}{\partial f_2}~\frac{\partial f_2}{\partial \mathbf{v}}\cdot\mathbf{u}$$

=== Derivatives of vector valued functions of vectors ===
Let f(v) be a vector valued function of the vector v. Then the derivative of f(v) with respect to v (or at v) is the second order tensor defined through its dot product with any vector u being

$$\frac{\partial \mathbf{f}}{\partial \mathbf{v}}\cdot\mathbf{u} = D\mathbf{f}(\mathbf{v})[\mathbf{u}] = \left[\frac{d}{d\alpha}~\mathbf{f}(\mathbf{v} + \alpha~\mathbf{u} ) \right]_{\alpha = 0}$$

for all vectors u. The above dot product yields a vector, and if u is a unit vector gives the direction derivative of f at v, in the directional u.

Properties:

1. If $\mathbf{f}(\mathbf{v}) = \mathbf{f}_1(\mathbf{v}) + \mathbf{f}_2(\mathbf{v})$ then
  $$\frac{\partial \mathbf{f}}{\partial \mathbf{v}}\cdot\mathbf{u} = \left(\frac{\partial \mathbf{f}_1}{\partial \mathbf{v}} + \frac{\partial \mathbf{f}_2}{\partial \mathbf{v}}\right)\cdot\mathbf{u}$$
2. If $\mathbf{f}(\mathbf{v}) = \mathbf{f}_1(\mathbf{v})\times\mathbf{f}_2(\mathbf{v})$ then
  $$\frac{\partial \mathbf{f}}{\partial \mathbf{v}}\cdot\mathbf{u} = \left(\frac{\partial \mathbf{f}_1}{\partial \mathbf{v}}\cdot\mathbf{u}\right)\times\mathbf{f}_2(\mathbf{v}) + \mathbf{f}_1(\mathbf{v})\times\left(\frac{\partial \mathbf{f}_2}{\partial \mathbf{v}}\cdot\mathbf{u} \right)$$
3. If $\mathbf{f}(\mathbf{v}) = \mathbf{f}_1(\mathbf{f}_2(\mathbf{v}))$ then
  $$\frac{\partial \mathbf{f}}{\partial \mathbf{v}}\cdot\mathbf{u} = \frac{\partial \mathbf{f}_1}{\partial \mathbf{f}_2}\cdot\left(\frac{\partial \mathbf{f}_2}{\partial \mathbf{v}}\cdot\mathbf{u} \right)$$

=== Derivatives of scalar valued functions of second-order tensors ===
Let $f(\boldsymbol{S})$ be a real valued function of the second order tensor $\boldsymbol{S}$. Then the derivative of $f(\boldsymbol{S})$ with respect to $\boldsymbol{S}$ (or at $\boldsymbol{S}$) in the direction $\boldsymbol{T}$ is the second order tensor defined as
$$\frac{\partial f}{\partial \boldsymbol{S}}:\boldsymbol{T} = Df(\boldsymbol{S})[\boldsymbol{T}] = \left[\frac{d}{d\alpha}~f(\boldsymbol{S} + \alpha~\boldsymbol{T})\right]_{\alpha = 0}$$
for all second order tensors $\boldsymbol{T}$.

Properties:

1. If $f(\boldsymbol{S}) = f_1(\boldsymbol{S}) + f_2(\boldsymbol{S})$ then
  $$\frac{\partial f}{\partial \boldsymbol{S}}:\boldsymbol{T} = \left(\frac{\partial f_1}{\partial \boldsymbol{S}} + \frac{\partial f_2}{\partial \boldsymbol{S}}\right):\boldsymbol{T}$$
2. If $f(\boldsymbol{S}) = f_1(\boldsymbol{S})~ f_2(\boldsymbol{S})$ then
  $$\frac{\partial f}{\partial \boldsymbol{S}}:\boldsymbol{T} = \left(\frac{\partial f_1}{\partial \boldsymbol{S}}:\boldsymbol{T}\right)~f_2(\boldsymbol{S}) + f_1(\boldsymbol{S})~\left(\frac{\partial f_2}{\partial \boldsymbol{S}}:\boldsymbol{T} \right)$$
3. If $f(\boldsymbol{S}) = f_1(f_2(\boldsymbol{S}))$ then
  $$\frac{\partial f}{\partial \boldsymbol{S}}:\boldsymbol{T} = \frac{\partial f_1}{\partial f_2}~\left(\frac{\partial f_2}{\partial \boldsymbol{S}}:\boldsymbol{T} \right)$$

=== Derivatives of tensor valued functions of second-order tensors ===
Let $\boldsymbol{F}(\boldsymbol{S})$ be a second order tensor valued function of the second order tensor $\boldsymbol{S}$. Then the derivative of $\boldsymbol{F}(\boldsymbol{S})$ with respect to $\boldsymbol{S}$ (or at $\boldsymbol{S}$) in the direction $\boldsymbol{T}$ is the fourth order tensor defined as
$$\frac{\partial \boldsymbol{F}}{\partial \boldsymbol{S}}:\boldsymbol{T} = D\boldsymbol{F}(\boldsymbol{S})[\boldsymbol{T}] = \left[\frac{d}{d\alpha}~\boldsymbol{F}(\boldsymbol{S} + \alpha~\boldsymbol{T})\right]_{\alpha = 0}$$
for all second order tensors $\boldsymbol{T}$.

Properties:

1. If $\boldsymbol{F}(\boldsymbol{S}) = \boldsymbol{F}_1(\boldsymbol{S}) + \boldsymbol{F}_2(\boldsymbol{S})$ then
  $$\frac{\partial \boldsymbol{F}}{\partial \boldsymbol{S}}:\boldsymbol{T} = \left(\frac{\partial \boldsymbol{F}_1}{\partial \boldsymbol{S}} + \frac{\partial \boldsymbol{F}_2}{\partial \boldsymbol{S}}\right):\boldsymbol{T}$$
2. If $\boldsymbol{F}(\boldsymbol{S}) = \boldsymbol{F}_1(\boldsymbol{S})\cdot\boldsymbol{F}_2(\boldsymbol{S})$ then
  $$\frac{\partial \boldsymbol{F}}{\partial \boldsymbol{S}}:\boldsymbol{T} = \left(\frac{\partial \boldsymbol{F}_1}{\partial \boldsymbol{S}}:\boldsymbol{T}\right)\cdot\boldsymbol{F}_2(\boldsymbol{S}) + \boldsymbol{F}_1 (\boldsymbol{S}) \cdot\left(\frac{\partial \boldsymbol{F}_2}{\partial \boldsymbol{S}}:\boldsymbol{T} \right)$$
3. If $\boldsymbol{F}(\boldsymbol{S}) = \boldsymbol{F}_1(\boldsymbol{F}_2(\boldsymbol{S}))$ then
  $$\frac{\partial \boldsymbol{F}}{\partial \boldsymbol{S}}:\boldsymbol{T} = \frac{\partial \boldsymbol{F}_1}{\partial \boldsymbol{F}_2}:\left(\frac{\partial \boldsymbol{F}_2}{\partial \boldsymbol{S}}:\boldsymbol{T} \right)$$
4. If $f(\boldsymbol{S}) = f_1(\boldsymbol{F}_2(\boldsymbol{S}))$ then
  $$\frac{\partial f}{\partial \boldsymbol{S}}:\boldsymbol{T} = \frac{\partial f_1}{\partial \boldsymbol{F}_2}:\left(\frac{\partial \boldsymbol{F}_2}{\partial \boldsymbol{S}}:\boldsymbol{T} \right)$$

== Gradient of a tensor field ==
The gradient, $\boldsymbol{\nabla}\boldsymbol{T}$, of a tensor field $\boldsymbol{T}(\mathbf{x})$ in the direction of an arbitrary constant vector c is defined as:
$$\boldsymbol{\nabla}\boldsymbol{T}\cdot\mathbf{c} = \lim_{\alpha \rightarrow 0} \quad \cfrac{d}{d\alpha}~\boldsymbol{T}(\mathbf{x}+\alpha\mathbf{c})$$
The gradient of a tensor field of order n is a tensor field of order n+1.

=== Cartesian coordinates ===
If $\mathbf{e}_1,\mathbf{e}_2,\mathbf{e}_3$ are the basis vectors in a Cartesian coordinate system, with coordinates of points denoted by ($x_1, x_2, x_3$), then the gradient of the tensor field $\boldsymbol{T}$ is given by
$$\boldsymbol{\nabla}\boldsymbol{T} = \cfrac{\partial{\boldsymbol{T}}}{\partial x_i} \otimes \mathbf{e}_i$$

Proof

The vectors x and c can be written as $\mathbf{x} = x_i~\mathbf{e}_i$ and $\mathbf{c} = c_i~\mathbf{e}_i$. Let y := x + αc. In that case the gradient is given by
$$\begin{align}
\boldsymbol{\nabla}\boldsymbol{T}\cdot\mathbf{c} & = \left.\cfrac{d}{d\alpha}~\boldsymbol{T}(x_1+\alpha c_1, x_2 + \alpha c_2, x_3 + \alpha c_3)\right|_{\alpha=0} \equiv \left.\cfrac{d}{d\alpha}~\boldsymbol{T}(y_1, y_2, y_3)\right|_{\alpha=0} \\
& = \left [\cfrac{\partial{\boldsymbol{T}}}{\partial y_1}~\cfrac{\partial y_1}{\partial \alpha} + \cfrac{\partial{\boldsymbol{T}}}{\partial y_2}~\cfrac{\partial y_2}{\partial \alpha} +
\cfrac{\partial{\boldsymbol{T}}}{\partial y_3}~\cfrac{\partial y_3}{\partial \alpha} \right]_{\alpha=0} =
\left [\cfrac{\partial{\boldsymbol{T}}}{\partial y_1}~c_1 +          \cfrac{\partial{\boldsymbol{T}}}{\partial y_2}~c_2 +
\cfrac{\partial{\boldsymbol{T}}}{\partial y_3}~c_3          \right]_{\alpha=0} \\
& = \cfrac{\partial{\boldsymbol{T}}}{\partial x_1}~c_1 + \cfrac{\partial{\boldsymbol{T}}}{\partial x_2}~c_2 +
\cfrac{\partial{\boldsymbol{T}}}{\partial x_3}~c_3 \equiv \cfrac{\partial{\boldsymbol{T}}}{\partial x_i}~c_i = \cfrac{\partial{\boldsymbol{T}}}{\partial x_i}~(\mathbf{e}_i\cdot\mathbf{c})
=  \left[\cfrac{\partial{\boldsymbol{T}}}{\partial x_i} \otimes \mathbf{e}_i\right]\cdot\mathbf{c} \qquad \square
\end{align}$$

Since the basis vectors do not vary in a Cartesian coordinate system we have the following relations for the gradients of a scalar field $\phi$, a vector field v, and a second-order tensor field $\boldsymbol{S}$.
$$\begin{align}
\boldsymbol{\nabla}\phi & = \cfrac{\partial\phi}{\partial x_i}~\mathbf{e}_i = \phi_{i} ~\mathbf{e}_i \\
\boldsymbol{\nabla}\mathbf{v} & = \cfrac{\partial (v_j \mathbf{e}_j)}{\partial x_i}\otimes\mathbf{e}_i  = \cfrac{\partial v_j}{\partial x_i}~\mathbf{e}_j\otimes\mathbf{e}_i = v_{j,i}~\mathbf{e}_j\otimes\mathbf{e}_i \\
\boldsymbol{\nabla}\boldsymbol{S} & = \cfrac{\partial (S_{jk} \mathbf{e}_j\otimes\mathbf{e}_k)}{\partial x_i}\otimes\mathbf{e}_i  = \cfrac{\partial S_{jk}}{\partial x_i}~\mathbf{e}_j\otimes\mathbf{e}_k\otimes\mathbf{e}_i = S_{jk,i}~\mathbf{e}_j\otimes\mathbf{e}_k\otimes\mathbf{e}_i
\end{align}$$

=== Curvilinear coordinates ===
If $\mathbf{g}^1,\mathbf{g}^2,\mathbf{g}^3$ are the contravariant basis vectors in a curvilinear coordinate system, with coordinates of points denoted by ($\xi^1, \xi^2, \xi^3$), then the gradient of the tensor field $\boldsymbol{T}$ is given by
$$\boldsymbol{\nabla}\boldsymbol{T} = \frac{\partial{\boldsymbol{T}}}{\partial \xi^i}\otimes\mathbf{g}^i$$

From this definition we have the following relations for the gradients of a scalar field $\phi$, a vector field v, and a second-order tensor field $\boldsymbol{S}$.
$$\begin{align}
\boldsymbol{\nabla}\phi & = \frac{\partial\phi}{\partial\xi^i}~\mathbf{g}^i \\[1.2ex]
\boldsymbol{\nabla}\mathbf{v} & = \frac{\partial\left(v^j \mathbf{g}_j\right)}{\partial\xi^i}\otimes\mathbf{g}^i \\
&= \left(\frac{\partial v^j}{\partial\xi^i} + v^k~\Gamma_{ik}^j\right)~\mathbf{g}_j\otimes\mathbf{g}^i
= \left(\frac{\partial v_j}{\partial\xi^i} - v_k~\Gamma_{ij}^k\right)~\mathbf{g}^j\otimes\mathbf{g}^i \\[1.2ex]
\boldsymbol{\nabla}\boldsymbol{S} & = \frac{\partial\left(S_{jk}~\mathbf{g}^j\otimes\mathbf{g}^k\right)}{\partial\xi^i}\otimes\mathbf{g}^i \\
&= \left(\frac{\partial S_{jk}}{\partial\xi_i} - S_{lk}~\Gamma_{ij}^l - S_{jl}~\Gamma_{ik}^l\right)~\mathbf{g}^j\otimes\mathbf{g}^k\otimes\mathbf{g}^i
\end{align}$$

where the Christoffel symbol $\Gamma_{ij}^k$ is defined using
$$\Gamma_{ij}^k~\mathbf{g}_k = \frac{\partial\mathbf{g}_i}{\partial\xi^j} \quad \implies \quad
\Gamma_{ij}^k = \frac{\partial\mathbf{g}_i}{\partial\xi^j}\cdot\mathbf{g}^k = -\mathbf{g}_i\cdot\frac{\partial \mathbf{g}^k}{\partial\xi^j}$$

==== Cylindrical polar coordinates ====
In cylindrical coordinates, the gradient is given by
$$\begin{align}
\boldsymbol{\nabla}\phi ={}\quad
&\frac{\partial\phi}{\partial r}~\mathbf{e}_r
+    \frac{1}{r}~\frac{\partial \phi}{\partial \theta}~\mathbf{e}_\theta
+    \frac{\partial\phi}{\partial z}~\mathbf{e}_z \\
\end{align}$$

$$\begin{align}
\boldsymbol{\nabla}\mathbf{v} ={}\quad
&\frac{\partial v_r}{\partial r}~\mathbf{e}_r \otimes \mathbf{e}_r
+    \frac{1}{r}\left(\frac{\partial v_r}{\partial\theta} - v_\theta\right)~\mathbf{e}_r \otimes \mathbf{e}_\theta
+    \frac{\partial v_r}{\partial z}~\mathbf{e}_r \otimes \mathbf{e}_z \\
{}+{} &\frac{\partial v_\theta}{\partial r}~\mathbf{e}_\theta \otimes \mathbf{e}_r
+    \frac{1}{r}\left(\frac{\partial v_\theta}{\partial\theta} + v_r\right)~\mathbf{e}_\theta \otimes \mathbf{e}_\theta
+    \frac{\partial v_\theta}{\partial z}~\mathbf{e}_\theta \otimes \mathbf{e}_z \\
{}+{} &\frac{\partial v_z}{\partial r}~\mathbf{e}_z\otimes\mathbf{e}_r
+    \frac{1}{r}\frac{\partial v_z}{\partial\theta}~\mathbf{e}_z \otimes\mathbf{e}_\theta
+    \frac{\partial v_z}{\partial z}~\mathbf{e}_z\otimes\mathbf{e}_z \\
\end{align}$$

$$\begin{align}
\boldsymbol{\nabla}\boldsymbol{S} ={}\quad
&\frac{\partial S_{rr}}{\partial r}~\mathbf{e}_r\otimes\mathbf{e}_r\otimes\mathbf{e}_r
+    \frac{\partial S_{rr}}{\partial z}~\mathbf{e}_r \otimes \mathbf{e}_r \otimes \mathbf{e}_z
+    \frac{1}{r}\left[\frac{\partial S_{rr}}{\partial\theta} - (S_{\theta r} + S_{r\theta})\right]~\mathbf{e}_r \otimes \mathbf{e}_r\otimes\mathbf{e}_\theta \\
{}+{} &\frac{\partial S_{r\theta}}{\partial r}~\mathbf{e}_r \otimes \mathbf{e}_\theta \otimes \mathbf{e}_r
+    \frac{\partial S_{r\theta}}{\partial z}~\mathbf{e}_r \otimes \mathbf{e}_\theta \otimes \mathbf{e}_z
+    \frac{1}{r}\left[\frac{\partial S_{r\theta}}{\partial\theta} + (S_{rr} - S_{\theta\theta})\right]~\mathbf{e}_r \otimes \mathbf{e}_\theta \otimes \mathbf{e}_\theta \\
{}+{} &\frac{\partial S_{rz}}{\partial r}~\mathbf{e}_r \otimes \mathbf{e}_z \otimes \mathbf{e}_r
+    \frac{\partial S_{rz}}{\partial z}~\mathbf{e}_r \otimes \mathbf{e}_z \otimes \mathbf{e}_z
+    \frac{1}{r}\left[\frac{\partial S_{rz}}{\partial \theta} - S_{\theta z}\right]~\mathbf{e}_r \otimes \mathbf{e}_z \otimes \mathbf{e}_\theta \\
{}+{} &\frac{\partial S_{\theta r}}{\partial r}~\mathbf{e}_\theta \otimes \mathbf{e}_r \otimes \mathbf{e}_r
+    \frac{\partial S_{\theta r}}{\partial z}~\mathbf{e}_\theta \otimes \mathbf{e}_r \otimes \mathbf{e}_z
+    \frac{1}{r}\left[\frac{\partial S_{\theta r}}{\partial\theta} + (S_{rr} - S_{\theta\theta})\right]~\mathbf{e}_\theta \otimes \mathbf{e}_r \otimes \mathbf{e}_\theta \\
{}+{} &\frac{\partial S_{\theta\theta}}{\partial r}~\mathbf{e}_\theta \otimes \mathbf{e}_\theta \otimes \mathbf{e}_r
+    \frac{\partial S_{\theta\theta}}{\partial z}~\mathbf{e}_\theta \otimes \mathbf{e}_\theta \otimes \mathbf{e}_z
+    \frac{1}{r}\left[\frac{\partial S_{\theta\theta}}{\partial\theta} + (S_{r\theta} + S_{\theta r})\right]~\mathbf{e}_\theta \otimes \mathbf{e}_\theta \otimes \mathbf{e}_\theta \\
{}+{} &\frac{\partial S_{\theta z}}{\partial r}~\mathbf{e}_\theta \otimes \mathbf{e}_z \otimes \mathbf{e}_r
+    \frac{\partial S_{\theta z}}{\partial z}~\mathbf{e}_\theta \otimes \mathbf{e}_z \otimes \mathbf{e}_z
+    \frac{1}{r}\left[\frac{\partial S_{\theta z}}{\partial\theta} + S_{rz}\right]~\mathbf{e}_\theta \otimes \mathbf{e}_z \otimes \mathbf{e}_\theta \\
{}+{} &\frac{\partial S_{zr}}{\partial r}~\mathbf{e}_z \otimes \mathbf{e}_r \otimes \mathbf{e}_r
+    \frac{\partial S_{zr}}{\partial z}~\mathbf{e}_z \otimes \mathbf{e}_r \otimes \mathbf{e}_z
+    \frac{1}{r}\left[\frac{\partial S_{zr}}{\partial \theta} - S_{z\theta}\right]~\mathbf{e}_z \otimes \mathbf{e}_r \otimes \mathbf{e}_\theta \\
{}+{} &\frac{\partial S_{z\theta}}{\partial r}~\mathbf{e}_z \otimes \mathbf{e}_\theta \otimes \mathbf{e}_r
+    \frac{\partial S_{z\theta}}{\partial z}~\mathbf{e}_z \otimes \mathbf{e}_\theta \otimes \mathbf{e}_z
+    \frac{1}{r}\left[\frac{\partial S_{z\theta}}{\partial\theta} + S_{zr}\right]~\mathbf{e}_z \otimes \mathbf{e}_\theta \otimes \mathbf{e}_\theta \\
{}+{} &\frac{\partial S_{zz}}{\partial r}~\mathbf{e}_z \otimes \mathbf{e}_z \otimes \mathbf{e}_r
+    \frac{\partial S_{zz}}{\partial z}~\mathbf{e}_z \otimes \mathbf{e}_z \otimes \mathbf{e}_z
+    \frac{1}{r}~\frac{\partial S_{zz}}{\partial\theta}~ \mathbf{e}_z \otimes \mathbf{e}_z \otimes \mathbf{e}_\theta
\end{align}$$

== Divergence of a tensor field ==
The divergence of a tensor field $\boldsymbol{T}(\mathbf{x})$ is defined using the recursive relation
$$(\boldsymbol{\nabla}\cdot\boldsymbol{T})\cdot\mathbf{c} =
\boldsymbol{\nabla}\cdot\left(\mathbf{c}\cdot\boldsymbol{T}^\textsf{T}\right) ~;\qquad
\boldsymbol{\nabla}\cdot\mathbf{v} = \text{tr}(\boldsymbol{\nabla}\mathbf{v})$$

where c is an arbitrary constant vector and v is a vector field. If $\boldsymbol{T}$ is a tensor field of order n > 1 then the divergence of the field is a tensor of order n− 1.

=== Cartesian coordinates ===
In a Cartesian coordinate system we have the following relations for a vector field v and a second-order tensor field $\boldsymbol{S}$.
$$\begin{align}
\boldsymbol{\nabla}\cdot\mathbf{v} &= \frac{\partial v_i}{\partial x_i} = v_{i,i} \\
\boldsymbol{\nabla}\cdot\boldsymbol{S} &= \frac{\partial S_{ik}}{\partial x_i}~\mathbf{e}_k = S_{ik, i}~\mathbf{e}_k
\end{align}$$

where tensor index notation for partial derivatives is used in the rightmost expressions. Note that
$$\boldsymbol{\nabla}\cdot\boldsymbol{S} \neq  \boldsymbol{\nabla}\cdot\boldsymbol{S}^\textsf{T}.$$

For a symmetric second-order tensor, the divergence is also often written as

$$\begin{align}
\boldsymbol{\nabla}\cdot\boldsymbol{S} &= \cfrac{\partial S_{ki}}{\partial x_i}~\mathbf{e}_k = S_{ki,i}~\mathbf{e}_k
\end{align}$$

The above expression is sometimes used as the definition of $\boldsymbol{\nabla}\cdot\boldsymbol{S}$ in Cartesian component form (often also written as $\operatorname{div}\boldsymbol{S}$). Note that such a definition is not consistent with the rest of this article (see the section on curvilinear co-ordinates).

The difference stems from whether the differentiation is performed with respect to the rows or columns of $\boldsymbol{S}$, and is conventional. This is demonstrated by an example. In a Cartesian coordinate system the second order tensor (matrix) $\mathbf{S}$ is the gradient of a vector function $\mathbf{v}$.

$$\begin{align}
\boldsymbol{\nabla} \cdot \left( \boldsymbol{\nabla} \mathbf{v} \right) &=
\boldsymbol{\nabla} \cdot \left( v_{i,j} ~\mathbf{e}_i \otimes \mathbf{e}_j \right) =
v_{i,ji} ~\mathbf{e}_i  \cdot \mathbf{e}_i \otimes \mathbf{e}_j =
\left( \boldsymbol{\nabla} \cdot  \mathbf{v} \right)_{,j} ~\mathbf{e}_j =
\boldsymbol{\nabla} \left( \boldsymbol{\nabla} \cdot \mathbf{v} \right) \\
\boldsymbol{\nabla} \cdot \left[ \left( \boldsymbol{\nabla} \mathbf{v} \right)^\textsf{T} \right] &=
\boldsymbol{\nabla} \cdot \left( v_{j,i} ~\mathbf{e}_i \otimes \mathbf{e}_j \right) =
v_{j,ii} ~\mathbf{e}_i \cdot \mathbf{e}_i \otimes \mathbf{e}_j =
\boldsymbol{\nabla}^{2}  v_{j} ~\mathbf{e}_j =
\boldsymbol{\nabla}^{2} \mathbf{v}
\end{align}$$

The last equation is equivalent to the alternative definition / interpretation

$$\begin{align}
\left( \boldsymbol{\nabla} \cdot \right)_\text{alt} \left( \boldsymbol{\nabla} \mathbf{v} \right) =
\left( \boldsymbol{\nabla} \cdot \right)_\text{alt} \left( v_{i,j} ~\mathbf{e}_i \otimes \mathbf{e}_j \right) =
v_{i,jj} ~\mathbf{e}_i \otimes \mathbf{e}_j \cdot  \mathbf{e}_j =
\boldsymbol{\nabla}^2 v_i ~\mathbf{e}_i =
\boldsymbol{\nabla}^2 \mathbf{v}
\end{align}$$

=== Curvilinear coordinates ===
In curvilinear coordinates, the divergences of a vector field v and a second-order tensor field $\boldsymbol{S}$ are
$$\begin{align}
\boldsymbol{\nabla}\cdot\mathbf{v}
&= \left(\cfrac{\partial v^i}{\partial \xi^i} + v^k~\Gamma_{ik}^i\right)\\
\boldsymbol{\nabla}\cdot\boldsymbol{S}
&= \left(\cfrac{\partial S_{ik}}{\partial \xi_i}- S_{lk}~\Gamma_{ii}^l - S_{il}~\Gamma_{ik}^l\right)~\mathbf{g}^k
\end{align}$$

More generally,
$$\begin{align}
\boldsymbol{\nabla}\cdot\boldsymbol{S} & = \left[\cfrac{\partial S_{ij}}{\partial q^k} - \Gamma^l_{ki}~S_{lj} - \Gamma^l_{kj}~S_{il}\right]~g^{ik}~\mathbf{b}^j \\[8pt]
& = \left[\cfrac{\partial S^{ij}}{\partial q^i} + \Gamma^i_{il}~S^{lj} + \Gamma^j_{il}~S^{il}\right]~\mathbf{b}_j \\[8pt]
& = \left[\cfrac{\partial S^i_{~j}}{\partial q^i} + \Gamma^i_{il}~S^l_{~j} - \Gamma^l_{ij}~S^i_{~l}\right]~\mathbf{b}^j \\[8pt]
& = \left[\cfrac{\partial S_i^{~j}}{\partial q^k} - \Gamma^l_{ik}~S_l^{~j} + \Gamma^j_{kl}~S_i^{~l}\right]~g^{ik}~\mathbf{b}_j
\end{align}$$

==== Cylindrical polar coordinates ====
In cylindrical polar coordinates
$$\begin{align}
\boldsymbol{\nabla}\cdot\mathbf{v} =\quad
&\frac{\partial v_r}{\partial r}
+    \frac{1}{r}\left(\frac{\partial v_\theta}{\partial\theta} + v_r \right)
+    \frac{\partial v_z}{\partial z}\\
\boldsymbol{\nabla}\cdot\boldsymbol{S} =\quad
&\frac{\partial S_{rr}}{\partial r}~\mathbf{e}_r
+    \frac{\partial S_{r\theta}}{\partial r}~\mathbf{e}_\theta
+    \frac{\partial S_{rz}}{\partial r}~\mathbf{e}_z \\
{}+{} &\frac{1}{r}\left[\frac{\partial S_{\theta r}}{\partial \theta}
+    (S_{rr} - S_{\theta\theta})\right]~\mathbf{e}_r
+    \frac{1}{r}\left[\frac{\partial S_{\theta\theta}}{\partial\theta}
+    (S_{r\theta} + S_{\theta r})\right]~\mathbf{e}_\theta
+    \frac{1}{r}\left[\frac{\partial S_{\theta z}}{\partial\theta} + S_{rz}\right]~\mathbf{e}_z \\
{}+{} &\frac{\partial S_{zr}}{\partial z}~\mathbf{e}_r
+    \frac{\partial S_{z\theta}}{\partial z}~\mathbf{e}_\theta
+    \frac{\partial S_{zz}}{\partial z}~\mathbf{e}_z
\end{align}$$

== Curl of a tensor field ==
The curl of an order-n > 1 tensor field $\boldsymbol{T}(\mathbf{x})$ is also defined using the recursive relation
$$(\boldsymbol{\nabla}\times\boldsymbol{T})\cdot\mathbf{c} = \boldsymbol{\nabla}\times(\mathbf{c}\cdot\boldsymbol{T}) ~;\qquad (\boldsymbol{\nabla}\times\mathbf{v})\cdot\mathbf{c} = \boldsymbol{\nabla}\cdot(\mathbf{v}\times\mathbf{c})$$
where c is an arbitrary constant vector and v is a vector field.

=== Curl of a first-order tensor (vector) field ===
Consider a vector field v and an arbitrary constant vector c. In index notation, the cross product is given by
$$\mathbf{v} \times \mathbf{c} = \varepsilon_{ijk}~v_j~c_k~\mathbf{e}_i$$
where $\varepsilon_{ijk}$ is the permutation symbol, otherwise known as the Levi-Civita symbol. Then,
$$\boldsymbol{\nabla}\cdot(\mathbf{v} \times \mathbf{c}) = \varepsilon_{ijk}~v_{j,i}~c_k = (\varepsilon_{ijk}~v_{j,i}~\mathbf{e}_k)\cdot\mathbf{c} = (\boldsymbol{\nabla}\times\mathbf{v})\cdot\mathbf{c}$$
Therefore,
$$\boldsymbol{\nabla}\times\mathbf{v} = \varepsilon_{ijk}~v_{j,i}~\mathbf{e}_k$$

=== Curl of a second-order tensor field ===
For a second-order tensor $\boldsymbol{S}$
$$\mathbf{c}\cdot\boldsymbol{S} = c_m~S_{mj}~\mathbf{e}_j$$
Hence, using the definition of the curl of a first-order tensor field,
$$\boldsymbol{\nabla}\times(\mathbf{c}\cdot\boldsymbol{S}) = \varepsilon_{ijk}~c_m~S_{mj,i}~\mathbf{e}_k = (\varepsilon_{ijk}~S_{mj,i}~\mathbf{e}_k\otimes\mathbf{e}_m)\cdot\mathbf{c} = (\boldsymbol{\nabla}\times\boldsymbol{S}) \cdot \mathbf{c}$$
Therefore, we have
$$\boldsymbol{\nabla}\times\boldsymbol{S} = \varepsilon_{ijk}~S_{mj,i}~\mathbf{e}_k\otimes\mathbf{e}_m$$

=== Identities involving the curl of a tensor field ===
The most commonly used identity involving the curl of a tensor field, $\boldsymbol{T}$, is
$$\boldsymbol{\nabla}\times(\boldsymbol{\nabla}\boldsymbol{T}) = \boldsymbol{0}$$
This identity holds for tensor fields of all orders. For the important case of a second-order tensor, $\boldsymbol{S}$, this identity implies that
$$\boldsymbol{\nabla}\times(\boldsymbol{\nabla}\boldsymbol{S}) = \boldsymbol{0} \quad \implies \quad S_{mi,j} - S_{mj,i} = 0$$

== Derivative of the determinant of a second-order tensor ==
The derivative of the determinant of a second order tensor $\boldsymbol{A}$ is given by
$$\frac{\partial}{\partial\boldsymbol{A}}\det(\boldsymbol{A}) = \det(\boldsymbol{A})~\left[\boldsymbol{A}^{-1}\right]^\textsf{T} ~.$$

In an orthonormal basis, the components of $\boldsymbol{A}$ can be written as a matrix A. In that case, the right hand side corresponds the cofactors of the matrix.

Proof

Let $\boldsymbol{A}$ be a second order tensor and let $f(\boldsymbol{A}) = \det(\boldsymbol{A})$. Then, from the definition of the derivative of a scalar valued function of a tensor, we have
$$\begin{align}
\frac{\partial f}{\partial\boldsymbol{A}}:\boldsymbol{T} & = \left.\cfrac{d}{d\alpha} \det(\boldsymbol{A} + \alpha~\boldsymbol{T}) \right|_{\alpha=0} \\
& = \left.\cfrac{d}{d\alpha} \det\left[\alpha~\boldsymbol{A}\left(\cfrac{1}{\alpha}~\boldsymbol{\mathit{I}} + \boldsymbol{A}^{-1}\cdot\boldsymbol{T}\right) \right] \right|_{\alpha=0} \\
& = \left.\cfrac{d}{d\alpha} \left[\alpha^3~\det(\boldsymbol{A})~\det\left(\cfrac{1}{\alpha}~\boldsymbol{\mathit{I}} + \boldsymbol{A}^{-1} \cdot \boldsymbol{T}\right)\right]\right|_{\alpha=0}.
\end{align}$$

The determinant of a tensor can be expressed in the form of a characteristic equation in terms of the invariants $I_1,I_2,I_3$ using
$$\det(\lambda~\boldsymbol{\mathit{I}} + \boldsymbol{A}) = \lambda^3 + I_1(\boldsymbol{A})~\lambda^2 + I_2(\boldsymbol{A})~\lambda + I_3(\boldsymbol{A}).$$

Using this expansion we can write
$$\begin{align}
\frac{\partial f}{\partial\boldsymbol{A}}: \boldsymbol{T}
& = \left.\cfrac{d}{d\alpha} \left[\alpha^3~\det(\boldsymbol{A})~\left(
\cfrac{1}{\alpha^3} +
I_1\left(\boldsymbol{A}^{-1}\cdot\boldsymbol{T}\right)~\cfrac{1}{\alpha^2} +
I_2\left(\boldsymbol{A}^{-1}\cdot\boldsymbol{T}\right)~\cfrac{1}{\alpha} +
I_3\left(\boldsymbol{A}^{-1}\cdot\boldsymbol{T}\right)
\right) \right] \right|_{\alpha=0} \\
& = \left.\det(\boldsymbol{A})~\cfrac{d}{d\alpha} \left[
1 + I_1\left(\boldsymbol{A}^{-1}\cdot\boldsymbol{T}\right)~\alpha +
I_2\left(\boldsymbol{A}^{-1}\cdot\boldsymbol{T}\right)~\alpha^2 +
I_3\left(\boldsymbol{A}^{-1}\cdot\boldsymbol{T}\right)~\alpha^3
\right] \right|_{\alpha=0} \\
& = \left.\det(\boldsymbol{A})~\left[
I_1(\boldsymbol{A}^{-1}\cdot\boldsymbol{T}) +
2~I_2\left(\boldsymbol{A}^{-1}\cdot\boldsymbol{T}\right)~\alpha +
3~I_3\left(\boldsymbol{A}^{-1}\cdot\boldsymbol{T}\right)~\alpha^2
\right] \right|_{\alpha=0} \\
& = \det(\boldsymbol{A})~I_1\left(\boldsymbol{A}^{-1}\cdot\boldsymbol{T}\right) ~.
\end{align}$$

Recall that the invariant $I_1$ is given by
$$I_1(\boldsymbol{A}) = \text{tr}{\boldsymbol{A}}.$$

Hence,
$$\frac{\partial f}{\partial\boldsymbol{A}}: \boldsymbol{T} =
\det(\boldsymbol{A})~\text{tr}\left(\boldsymbol{A}^{-1}\cdot\boldsymbol{T}\right) =
\det(\boldsymbol{A})~\left[\boldsymbol{A}^{-1}\right]^\textsf{T} : \boldsymbol{T}.$$

Invoking the arbitrariness of $\boldsymbol{T}$ we then have
$$\frac{\partial f}{\partial\boldsymbol{A}} = \det(\boldsymbol{A})~\left[\boldsymbol{A}^{-1}\right]^\textsf{T} ~.$$

== Derivatives of the invariants of a second-order tensor ==
The principal invariants of a second order tensor are
$$\begin{align}
I_1(\boldsymbol{A}) & = \text{tr}{\boldsymbol{A}} \\
I_2(\boldsymbol{A}) & = \tfrac{1}{2} \left[ (\text{tr}{\boldsymbol{A}})^2 - \text{tr}{\boldsymbol{A}^2} \right] \\
I_3(\boldsymbol{A}) & = \det(\boldsymbol{A})
\end{align}$$

The derivatives of these three invariants with respect to $\boldsymbol{A}$ are
$$\begin{align}
\frac{\partial I_1}{\partial\boldsymbol{A}} & = \boldsymbol{\mathit{1}}  \\[3pt]
\frac{\partial I_2}{\partial\boldsymbol{A}} & = I_1 \, \boldsymbol{\mathit{1}} - \boldsymbol{A}^\textsf{T} \\[3pt]
\frac{\partial I_3}{\partial\boldsymbol{A}} & = \det(\boldsymbol{A})~\left[\boldsymbol{A}^{-1}\right]^\textsf{T} \\
&= I_2~\boldsymbol{\mathit{1}} - \boldsymbol{A}^\textsf{T}~\left(I_1~\boldsymbol{\mathit{1}} - \boldsymbol{A}^\textsf{T}\right)
= \left(\boldsymbol{A}^2 - I_1~\boldsymbol{A} + I_2~\boldsymbol{\mathit{1}}\right)^\textsf{T}
\end{align}$$

Proof

From the derivative of the determinant we know that
$$\frac{\partial I_3}{\partial \boldsymbol{A}} = \det(\boldsymbol{A})~\left[\boldsymbol{A}^{-1}\right]^\textsf{T} ~.$$

For the derivatives of the other two invariants, let us go back to the characteristic equation
$$\det(\lambda~\boldsymbol{\mathit{1}} + \boldsymbol{A}) =
\lambda^3 + I_1(\boldsymbol{A})~\lambda^2 + I_2(\boldsymbol{A})~\lambda + I_3(\boldsymbol{A}) ~.$$

Using the same approach as for the determinant of a tensor, we can show that
$$\frac{\partial }{\partial \boldsymbol{A}}\det(\lambda~\boldsymbol{\mathit{1}} + \boldsymbol{A}) =
\det(\lambda~\boldsymbol{\mathit{1}} + \boldsymbol{A})~\left[(\lambda~\boldsymbol{\mathit{1}} + \boldsymbol{A})^{-1}\right]^\textsf{T} ~.$$

Now the left hand side can be expanded as
$$\begin{align}
\frac{\partial}{\partial \boldsymbol{A}}\det(\lambda~\boldsymbol{\mathit{1}} + \boldsymbol{A}) & =
\frac{\partial}{\partial \boldsymbol{A}}\left[
\lambda^3 + I_1(\boldsymbol{A})~\lambda^2 + I_2(\boldsymbol{A})~\lambda + I_3(\boldsymbol{A}) \right] \\
& =
\frac{\partial I_1}{\partial \boldsymbol{A}}~\lambda^2 + \frac{\partial I_2}{\partial \boldsymbol{A}}~\lambda +
\frac{\partial I_3}{\partial \boldsymbol{A}}~.
\end{align}$$

Hence
$$\frac{\partial I_1}{\partial \boldsymbol{A}}~\lambda^2 + \frac{\partial I_2}{\partial \boldsymbol{A}}~\lambda +
\frac{\partial I_3}{\partial \boldsymbol{A}} =
\det(\lambda~\boldsymbol{\mathit{1}} + \boldsymbol{A})~\left[(\lambda~\boldsymbol{\mathit{1}} + \boldsymbol{A})^{-1}\right]^\textsf{T}$$
or,
$$(\lambda~\boldsymbol{\mathit{1}} + \boldsymbol{A})^\textsf{T}\cdot\left[
\frac{\partial I_1}{\partial \boldsymbol{A}}~\lambda^2 + \frac{\partial I_2}{\partial \boldsymbol{A}}~\lambda +
\frac{\partial I_3}{\partial \boldsymbol{A}}\right] =
\det(\lambda~\boldsymbol{\mathit{1}} + \boldsymbol{A})~\boldsymbol{\mathit{1}} ~.$$

Expanding the right hand side and separating terms on the left hand side gives
$$\left(\lambda~\boldsymbol{\mathit{1}} +\boldsymbol{A}^\textsf{T}\right)\cdot\left[
\frac{\partial I_1}{\partial \boldsymbol{A}}~\lambda^2 + \frac{\partial I_2}{\partial \boldsymbol{A}}~\lambda +
\frac{\partial I_3}{\partial \boldsymbol{A}}\right] =
\left[\lambda^3 + I_1~\lambda^2 + I_2~\lambda + I_3\right]
\boldsymbol{\mathit{1}}$$

or,
$$\begin{align}
\left[\frac{\partial I_1}{\partial \boldsymbol{A}}~\lambda^3 \right.&
\left.+ \frac{\partial I_2}{\partial \boldsymbol{A}}~\lambda^2 +
\frac{\partial I_3}{\partial \boldsymbol{A}}~\lambda\right]\boldsymbol{\mathit{1}} +
\boldsymbol{A}^\textsf{T}\cdot\frac{\partial I_1}{\partial \boldsymbol{A}}~\lambda^2 +
\boldsymbol{A}^\textsf{T}\cdot\frac{\partial I_2}{\partial \boldsymbol{A}}~\lambda +
\boldsymbol{A}^\textsf{T}\cdot\frac{\partial I_3}{\partial \boldsymbol{A}} \\
& =
\left[\lambda^3 + I_1~\lambda^2 + I_2~\lambda + I_3\right]
\boldsymbol{\mathit{1}} ~.
\end{align}$$

If we define $I_0 := 1$ and $I_4 := 0$, we can write the above as
$$\begin{align}
\left[\frac{\partial I_1}{\partial \boldsymbol{A}}~\lambda^3 \right.&
\left.+ \frac{\partial I_2}{\partial \boldsymbol{A}}~\lambda^2 +
\frac{\partial I_3}{\partial \boldsymbol{A}}~\lambda + \frac{\partial I_4}{\partial \boldsymbol{A}}\right]\boldsymbol{\mathit{1}} +
\boldsymbol{A}^\textsf{T}\cdot\frac{\partial I_0}{\partial \boldsymbol{A}}~\lambda^3 +
\boldsymbol{A}^\textsf{T}\cdot\frac{\partial I_1}{\partial \boldsymbol{A}}~\lambda^2 +
\boldsymbol{A}^\textsf{T}\cdot\frac{\partial I_2}{\partial \boldsymbol{A}}~\lambda +
\boldsymbol{A}^\textsf{T}\cdot\frac{\partial I_3}{\partial \boldsymbol{A}} \\
&=
\left[I_0~\lambda^3 + I_1~\lambda^2 + I_2~\lambda + I_3\right]
\boldsymbol{\mathit{1}} ~.
\end{align}$$

Collecting terms containing various powers of λ, we get
$$\begin{align}
\lambda^3&\left(I_0~\boldsymbol{\mathit{1}} - \frac{\partial I_1}{\partial \boldsymbol{A}}~\boldsymbol{\mathit{1}} -
\boldsymbol{A}^\textsf{T}\cdot\frac{\partial I_0}{\partial \boldsymbol{A}}\right) +
\lambda^2\left(I_1~\boldsymbol{\mathit{1}} - \frac{\partial I_2}{\partial \boldsymbol{A}}~\boldsymbol{\mathit{1}} -
\boldsymbol{A}^\textsf{T}\cdot\frac{\partial I_1}{\partial \boldsymbol{A}}\right) + \\
&\qquad \qquad\lambda\left(I_2~\boldsymbol{\mathit{1}} - \frac{\partial I_3}{\partial \boldsymbol{A}}~\boldsymbol{\mathit{1}} -
\boldsymbol{A}^\textsf{T}\cdot\frac{\partial I_2}{\partial \boldsymbol{A}}\right) +
\left(I_3~\boldsymbol{\mathit{1}} - \frac{\partial I_4}{\partial \boldsymbol{A}}~\boldsymbol{\mathit{1}} -
\boldsymbol{A}^\textsf{T}\cdot\frac{\partial I_3}{\partial \boldsymbol{A}}\right)  = 0 ~.
\end{align}$$

Then, invoking the arbitrariness of λ, we have
$$\begin{align}
I_0~\boldsymbol{\mathit{1}} - \frac{\partial I_1}{\partial \boldsymbol{A}}~\boldsymbol{\mathit{1}} - \boldsymbol{A}^\textsf{T}\cdot\frac{\partial I_0}{\partial \boldsymbol{A}} & = 0 \\
I_1~\boldsymbol{\mathit{1}} - \frac{\partial I_2}{\partial \boldsymbol{A}}~\boldsymbol{\mathit{1}} - I_2~\boldsymbol{\mathit{1}} - \frac{\partial I_3}{\partial \boldsymbol{A}}~\boldsymbol{\mathit{1}} - \boldsymbol{A}^\textsf{T}\cdot\frac{\partial I_2}{\partial \boldsymbol{A}} & = 0 \\
I_3~\boldsymbol{\mathit{1}} - \frac{\partial I_4}{\partial \boldsymbol{A}}~\boldsymbol{\mathit{1}} - \boldsymbol{A}^\textsf{T}\cdot\frac{\partial I_3}{\partial \boldsymbol{A}} & = 0 ~.
\end{align}$$

This implies that
$$\begin{align}
\frac{\partial I_1}{\partial \boldsymbol{A}} &= \boldsymbol{\mathit{1}} \\
\frac{\partial I_2}{\partial \boldsymbol{A}} & = I_1~\boldsymbol{\mathit{1}} - \boldsymbol{A}^\textsf{T} \\
\frac{\partial I_3}{\partial \boldsymbol{A}} & = I_2~\boldsymbol{\mathit{1}} - \boldsymbol{A}^\textsf{T}~\left(I_1~\boldsymbol{\mathit{1}} - \boldsymbol{A}^\textsf{T}\right) = \left(\boldsymbol{A}^2 -I_1~\boldsymbol{A} + I_2~\boldsymbol{\mathit{1}}\right)^\textsf{T}
\end{align}$$

== Derivative of the second-order identity tensor ==
Let $\boldsymbol{\mathit{1}}$ be the second order identity tensor. Then the derivative of this tensor with respect to a second order tensor $\boldsymbol{A}$ is given by
$$\frac{\partial \boldsymbol{\mathit{1}}}{\partial \boldsymbol{A}}:\boldsymbol{T} = \boldsymbol{\mathsf{0}}:\boldsymbol{T} = \boldsymbol{\mathit{0}}$$
This is because $\boldsymbol{\mathit{1}}$ is independent of $\boldsymbol{A}$.

== Derivative of a second-order tensor with respect to itself ==
Let $\boldsymbol{A}$ be a second order tensor. Then
$$\frac{\partial \boldsymbol{A}}{\partial \boldsymbol{A}}:\boldsymbol{T} =
\left[\frac{\partial }{\partial \alpha} (\boldsymbol{A} + \alpha~\boldsymbol{T})\right]_{\alpha = 0} =
\boldsymbol{T} =
\boldsymbol{\mathsf{I}}:\boldsymbol{T}$$

Therefore,
$$\frac{\partial \boldsymbol{A}}{\partial \boldsymbol{A}} = \boldsymbol{\mathsf{I}}$$

Here $\boldsymbol{\mathsf{I}}$ is the fourth order identity tensor. In index notation with respect to an orthonormal basis
$$\boldsymbol{\mathsf{I}} = \delta_{ik}~\delta_{jl}~\mathbf{e}_i\otimes\mathbf{e}_j\otimes\mathbf{e}_k\otimes\mathbf{e}_l$$

This result implies that
$$\frac{\partial \boldsymbol{A}^\textsf{T}}{\partial \boldsymbol{A}}:\boldsymbol{T} = \boldsymbol{\mathsf{I}}^\textsf{T}:\boldsymbol{T} = \boldsymbol{T}^\textsf{T}$$
where
$$\boldsymbol{\mathsf{I}}^\textsf{T} = \delta_{jk}~\delta_{il}~\mathbf{e}_i\otimes\mathbf{e}_j\otimes\mathbf{e}_k\otimes\mathbf{e}_l$$

Therefore, if the tensor $\boldsymbol{A}$ is symmetric, then the derivative is also symmetric and we get
$$\frac{\partial \boldsymbol{A}}{\partial \boldsymbol{A}} = \boldsymbol{\mathsf{I}}^{(s)}
= \frac{1}{2}~\left(\boldsymbol{\mathsf{I}} + \boldsymbol{\mathsf{I}}^\textsf{T}\right)$$
where the symmetric fourth order identity tensor is
$$\boldsymbol{\mathsf{I}}^{(s)} = \frac{1}{2}~(\delta_{ik}~\delta_{jl} + \delta_{il}~\delta_{jk})
~\mathbf{e}_i\otimes\mathbf{e}_j\otimes\mathbf{e}_k\otimes\mathbf{e}_l$$

== Derivative of the inverse of a second-order tensor ==
Let $\boldsymbol{A}$ and $\boldsymbol{T}$ be two second order tensors, then
$$\frac{\partial }{\partial \boldsymbol{A}} \left(\boldsymbol{A}^{-1}\right) : \boldsymbol{T} = - \boldsymbol{A}^{-1}\cdot\boldsymbol{T}\cdot\boldsymbol{A}^{-1}$$
In index notation with respect to an orthonormal basis
$$\frac{\partial A^{-1}_{ij}}{\partial A_{kl}}~T_{kl} = - A^{-1}_{ik}~T_{kl}~A^{-1}_{lj} \implies \frac{\partial A^{-1}_{ij}}{\partial A_{kl}} = - A^{-1}_{ik}~A^{-1}_{lj}$$
We also have
$$\frac{\partial }{\partial \boldsymbol{A}} \left(\boldsymbol{A}^{-\textsf{T}}\right) : \boldsymbol{T} = - \boldsymbol{A}^{-\textsf{T}}\cdot\boldsymbol{T}^\textsf{T}\cdot\boldsymbol{A}^{-\textsf{T}}$$
In index notation
$$\frac{\partial A^{-1}_{ji}}{\partial A_{kl}}~T_{kl} = - A^{-1}_{jk}~T_{lk}~A^{-1}_{li} \implies \frac{\partial A^{-1}_{ji}}{\partial A_{kl}} = - A^{-1}_{li}~A^{-1}_{jk}$$
If the tensor $\boldsymbol{A}$ is symmetric then
$$\frac{\partial A^{-1}_{ij}}{\partial A_{kl}} = -\cfrac{1}{2}\left(A^{-1}_{ik}~A^{-1}_{jl} + A^{-1}_{il}~A^{-1}_{jk}\right)$$

Proof

Recall that
$$\frac{\partial \boldsymbol{\mathit{1}}}{\partial \boldsymbol{A}}:\boldsymbol{T} = \boldsymbol{\mathit{0}}$$

Since $\boldsymbol{A}^{-1}\cdot\boldsymbol{A} = \boldsymbol{\mathit{1}}$, we can write
$$\frac{\partial }{\partial \boldsymbol{A}}\left(\boldsymbol{A}^{-1}\cdot\boldsymbol{A}\right):\boldsymbol{T} = \boldsymbol{\mathit{0}}$$

Using the product rule for second order tensors
$$\frac{\partial }{\partial \boldsymbol{S}}[\boldsymbol{F}_1(\boldsymbol{S})\cdot\boldsymbol{F}_2(\boldsymbol{S})]:\boldsymbol{T} =
\left(\frac{\partial \boldsymbol{F}_1}{\partial \boldsymbol{S}}:\boldsymbol{T}\right)\cdot\boldsymbol{F}_2 +
\boldsymbol{F}_1\cdot\left(\frac{\partial \boldsymbol{F}_2}{\partial \boldsymbol{S}}:\boldsymbol{T}\right)$$

we get
$$\frac{\partial }{\partial \boldsymbol{A}}(\boldsymbol{A}^{-1}\cdot\boldsymbol{A}):\boldsymbol{T} =
\left(\frac{\partial \boldsymbol{A}^{-1}}{\partial \boldsymbol{A}}:\boldsymbol{T}\right)\cdot\boldsymbol{A} +
\boldsymbol{A}^{-1}\cdot\left(\frac{\partial \boldsymbol{A}}{\partial \boldsymbol{A}}:\boldsymbol{T}\right)
= \boldsymbol{\mathit{0}}$$
or,
$$\left(\frac{\partial \boldsymbol{A}^{-1}}{\partial \boldsymbol{A}}:\boldsymbol{T}\right)\cdot\boldsymbol{A} = - \boldsymbol{A}^{-1}\cdot\boldsymbol{T}$$

Therefore,
$$\frac{\partial }{\partial \boldsymbol{A}} \left(\boldsymbol{A}^{-1}\right) : \boldsymbol{T} = - \boldsymbol{A}^{-1}\cdot\boldsymbol{T}\cdot\boldsymbol{A}^{-1}$$

== Integration by parts ==
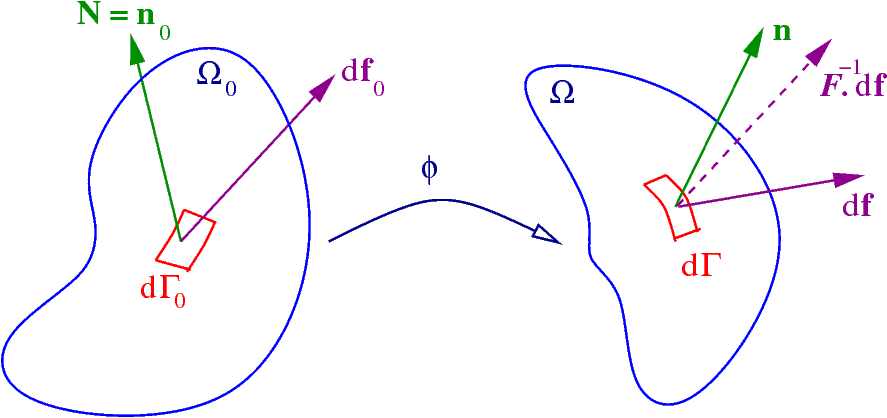
Domain $\Omega$, its boundary $\Gamma$ and the outward unit normal $\mathbf{n}$

Another important operation related to tensor derivatives in continuum mechanics is integration by parts. The formula for integration by parts can be written as
$$\int_{\Omega} \boldsymbol{F}\otimes\boldsymbol{\nabla}\boldsymbol{G}\,d\Omega = \int_{\Gamma} \mathbf{n} \otimes (\boldsymbol{F}\otimes\boldsymbol{G})\,d\Gamma - \int_{\Omega} \boldsymbol{G}\otimes\boldsymbol{\nabla}\boldsymbol{F}\,d\Omega$$

where $\boldsymbol{F}$ and $\boldsymbol{G}$ are differentiable tensor fields of arbitrary order, $\mathbf{n}$ is the unit outward normal to the domain over which the tensor fields are defined, $\otimes$ represents a generalized tensor product operator, and $\boldsymbol{\nabla}$ is a generalized gradient operator. When $\boldsymbol{F}$ is equal to the identity tensor, we get the divergence theorem
$$\int_{\Omega}\boldsymbol{\nabla}\boldsymbol{G}\,d\Omega = \int_{\Gamma} \mathbf{n}\otimes\boldsymbol{G}\,d\Gamma \,.$$

We can express the formula for integration by parts in Cartesian index notation as
$$\int_{\Omega} F_{ijk....}\,G_{lmn...,p}\,d\Omega = \int_{\Gamma} n_p\,F_{ijk...}\,G_{lmn...}\,d\Gamma - \int_{\Omega} G_{lmn...}\,F_{ijk...,p}\,d\Omega \,.$$

For the special case where the tensor product operation is a contraction of one index and the gradient operation is a divergence, and both $\boldsymbol{F}$ and $\boldsymbol{G}$ are second order tensors, we have
$$\int_{\Omega} \boldsymbol{F}\cdot(\boldsymbol{\nabla}\cdot\boldsymbol{G})\,d\Omega = \int_{\Gamma} \mathbf{n}\cdot\left(\boldsymbol{G}\cdot\boldsymbol{F}^\textsf{T}\right)\,d\Gamma - \int_{\Omega} (\boldsymbol{\nabla}\boldsymbol{F}):\boldsymbol{G}^\textsf{T}\,d\Omega \,.$$

In index notation,
$$\int_{\Omega} F_{ij}\,G_{pj,p}\,d\Omega = \int_{\Gamma} n_p\,F_{ij}\,G_{pj}\,d\Gamma - \int_{\Omega} G_{pj}\,F_{ij,p}\,d\Omega \,.$$

== See also ==
- Covariant derivative
- Ricci calculus
