= Christianity and science =

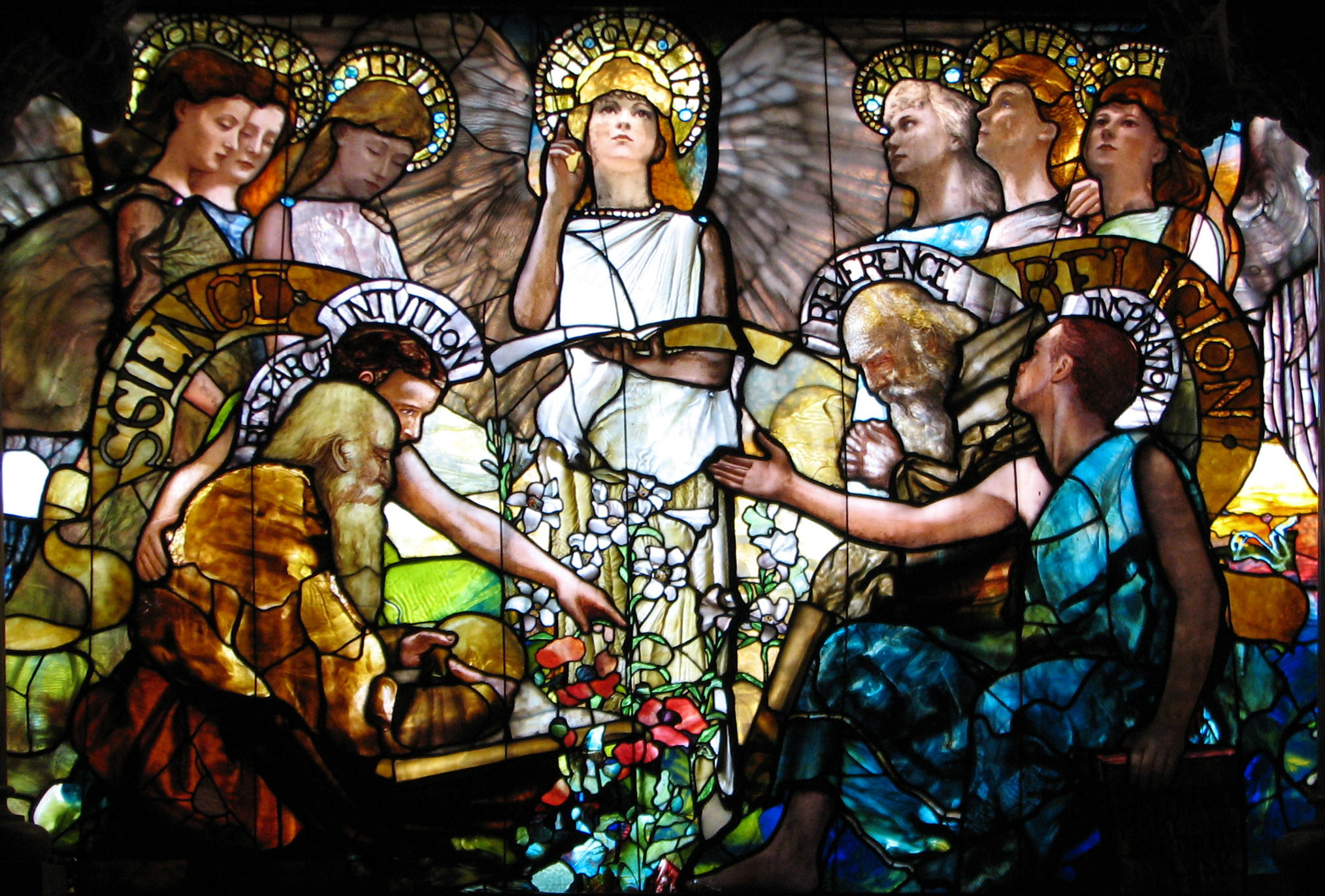
Science and Religion are portrayed to be in harmony in the Tiffany window Education (1890).

Most scientific and technical innovations prior to the Scientific Revolution were achieved by societies organized by religious traditions. Ancient Christian scholars pioneered individual elements of the scientific method. Historically, Christianity has been and still is a patron of sciences. It has been prolific in the foundation of schools, universities and hospitals, and many Christian clergy have been active in the sciences and have made significant contributions to the development of science.

Historians of science such as Pierre Duhem credit medieval Catholic mathematicians and philosophers such as John Buridan, Nicole Oresme and Roger Bacon as the founders of modern science. Duhem concluded that "the mechanics and physics of which modern times are justifiably proud to proceed, by an uninterrupted series of scarcely perceptible improvements, from doctrines professed in the heart of the medieval schools". Many of the most distinguished classical scholars in the Byzantine Empire held high office in the Eastern Orthodox Church. Protestantism has had an important influence on science, according to the Merton Thesis, there was a positive correlation between the rise of English Puritanism and German Pietism on the one hand, and early experimental science on the other.

Christian scholars and scientists have made noted contributions to science and technology fields, as well as medicine, both historically and in modern times. Some scholars state that Christianity contributed to the rise of the Scientific Revolution. Between 1901 and 2001, about 56.5% of Nobel Prize laureates in scientific fields were Christians, and 26% were of Jewish descent (including Jewish atheists).

Events in Christian Europe, such as the Galileo affair, that were associated with the Scientific Revolution and the Age of Enlightenment led some writers such as John William Draper to postulate a conflict thesis, holding that religion and science have been in conflict throughout history. While the conflict thesis remains popular in atheistic and antireligious circles, it has lost favor among most contemporary historians of science. Most contemporary historians of science believe the Galileo affair is an exception in the overall relationship between science and Christianity and have also corrected numerous false interpretations of this event.

== Overview ==
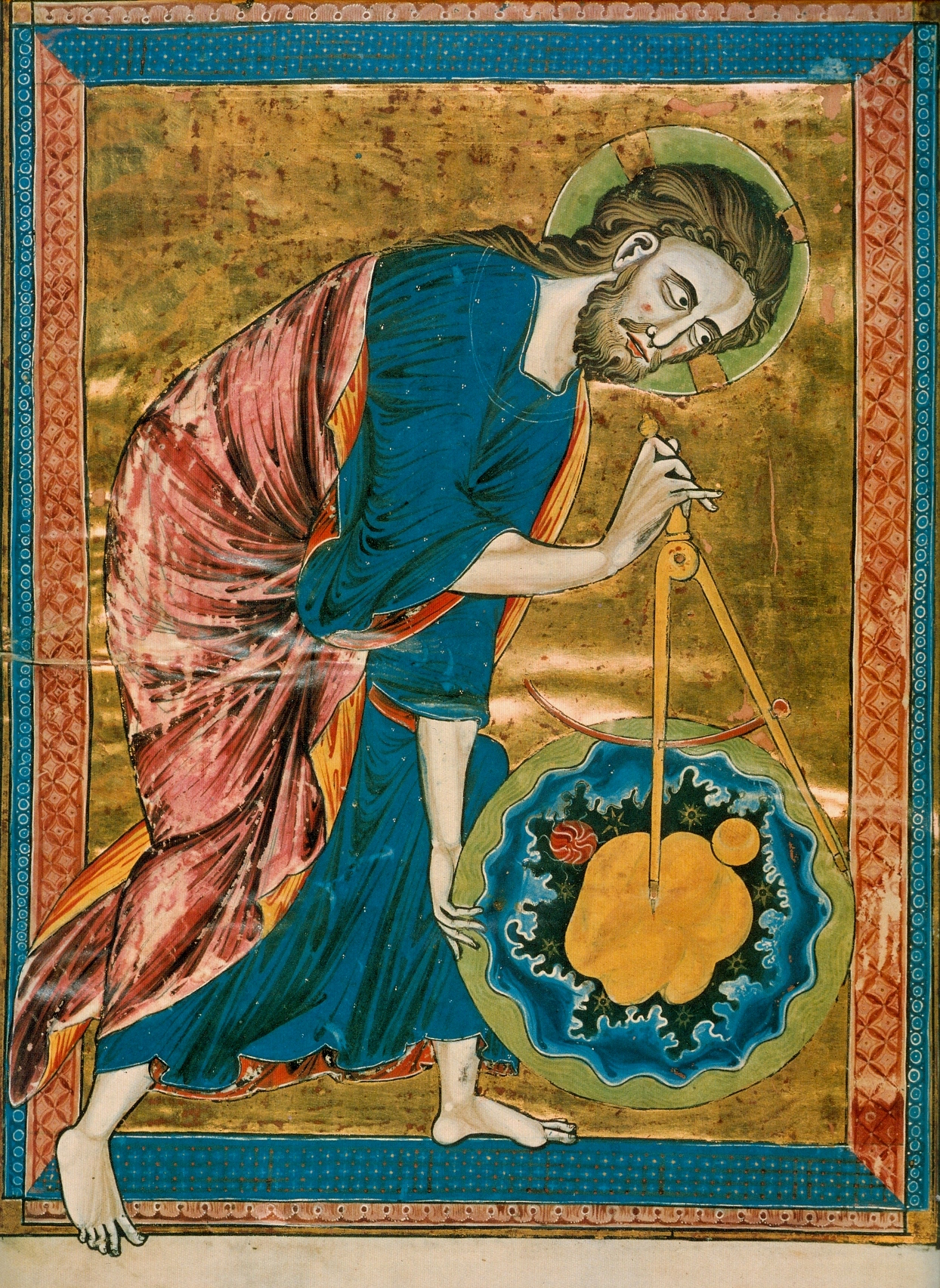
Science, and particularly geometry and astronomy, was linked directly to the divine for most medieval scholars. The compass in this 13th-century manuscript is a symbol of creation.

Most sources of knowledge available to the early Christians were connected to pagan worldviews as the early Christians largely lived among pagans. There were various opinions on how Christianity should regard pagan learning, which included its ideas about nature. For instance, among early Christian teachers, from Tertullian (c. 160–220) held a generally negative opinion of Greek philosophy, while Origen (c. 185–254) regarded it much more favourably and required his students to read nearly every work available to them.

Earlier attempts at reconciliation of Christianity with Newtonian mechanics appear quite different from later attempts at reconciliation with the newer scientific ideas of evolution or relativity. Many early interpretations of evolution polarized themselves around a struggle for existence. These ideas were significantly countered by later findings of universal patterns of biological cooperation. According to John Habgood, all man really knows here is that the universe seems to be a mix of good and evil, beauty and pain, and that suffering may somehow be part of the process of creation. Habgood holds that Christians should not be surprised that suffering may be used creatively by God, given their faith in the symbol of the Cross. Robert John Russell has examined consonance and dissonance between modern physics, evolutionary biology, and Christian theology.

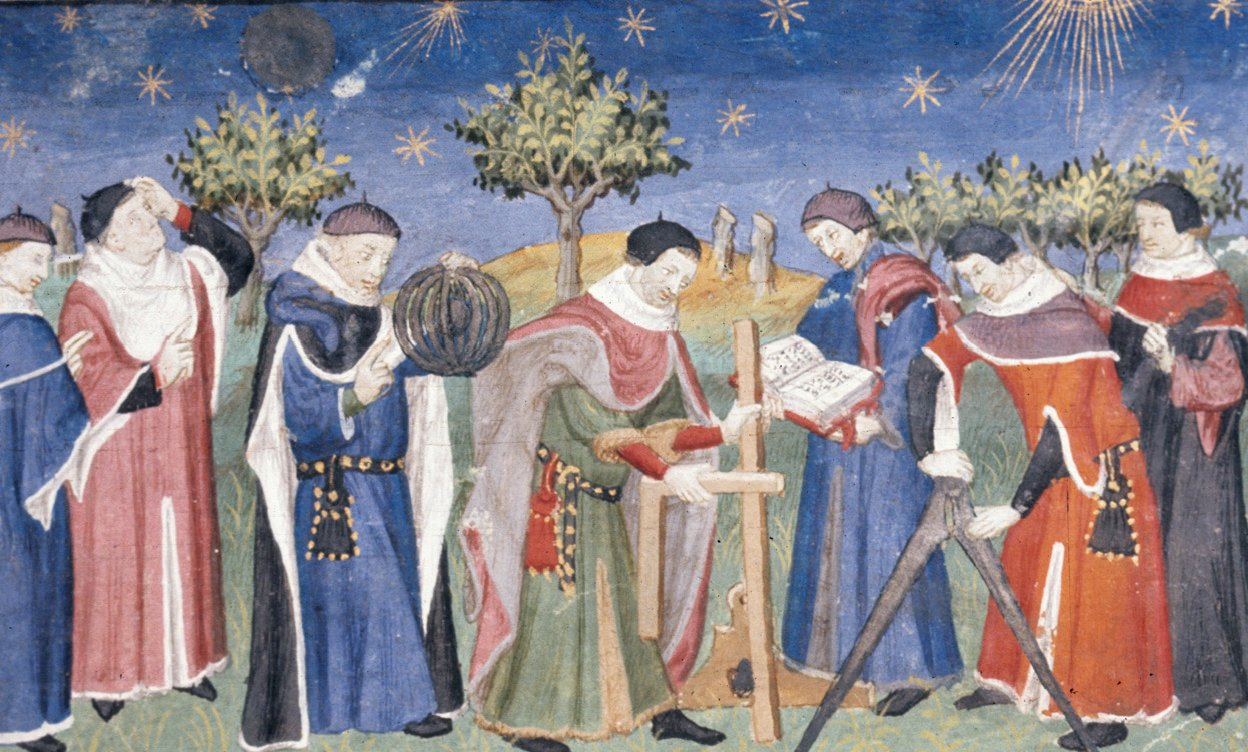
Clerks studying astronomy and geometry. France, early 15th century.

Christian philosophers Augustine of Hippo (354–430) and Thomas Aquinas held that scriptures can have multiple interpretations on certain areas where the matters were far beyond their reach, therefore one should leave room for future findings to shed light on the meanings. Augustine argued:

Usually, even a non-Christian knows something about the earth, the heavens, and the other elements of this world, about the motion and orbit of the stars ... Now, it is a disgraceful and dangerous thing for an infidel to hear a Christian, presumably giving the meaning of Holy Scripture, talking non-sense on these topics; and we should take all means to prevent such an embarrassing situation, in which people show up vast ignorance in a Christian and laugh it to scorn. The shame is not so much that an ignorant individual is derided, but that people outside the household of the faith think our sacred writers held such opinions, and, to the great loss of those for whose salvation we toil, the writers of our Scripture are criticized and rejected as unlearned men.

The "Handmaiden" tradition, which saw secular studies of the universe as a very important and helpful part of arriving at a better understanding of scripture, was adopted throughout Christian history from early on. Also, the sense that God created the world as a self-operating system is what motivated many Christians throughout the Middle Ages to investigate nature.

The Byzantine Empire was one of the peaks in Christian history and Christian civilization, and Constantinople remained the leading city of the Christian world in size, wealth, and culture. There was a renewed interest in classical Greek philosophy, as well as an increase in literary output in vernacular Greek. The Byzantine science played an important role in the transmission of classical knowledge to the Islamic world and to Renaissance Italy, and also in the transmission of Islamic science to Renaissance Italy. Many of the most distinguished classical scholars held high office in the Eastern Orthodox Church.

Modern historians of science such as J.L. Heilbron, Alistair Cameron Crombie, David Lindberg, Edward Grant, Thomas Goldstein, and Ted Davis have reviewed the popular notion that medieval Christianity was a negative influence in the development of civilization and science. In their views, not only did the monks save and cultivate the remnants of ancient civilization during the barbarian invasions, but the medieval church promoted learnings and science through its sponsorship of many universities which, under its leadership, grew rapidly in Europe in the eleventh and twelfth centuries. St. Thomas Aquinas, the Church's "model theologian", not only argued that reason is in harmony with faith, he even recognized that reason can contribute to understanding revelation, and so encouraged intellectual development. He was not unlike other medieval theologians who sought out reason in the effort to defend his faith. Some of today's scholars, such as Stanley Jaki, have claimed that Christianity with its particular worldview, was a crucial factor for the emergence of modern science. According to professor Noah J. Efron, virtually all modern scholars and historians agree that Christianity moved many early-modern intellectuals to study nature systematically.

Physics teacher David Hutchings and intellectual historian James C. Ungureanu credit the central tenets of traditional Christianity for having been the greatest benefit to scientific thinking, while at the same time noting the irony of the conflict thesis:

And yet, as impossible as it might seem, both Conflict and Warfare are plagued by an even greater irony than that. It turns out that when they went after Christian doctrine for being the ultimate enemy of science, they were engaging in friendly fire. For, in actual fact, no other body of thought has ever been of greater benefit to scientific thinking than the central tenets of traditional Christianity have—in the whole of human history.

— David Hutchings & James C. Ungureanu

David C. Lindberg states that the widespread popular belief that the Middle Ages was a time of ignorance and superstition due to the Christian church is a "caricature". According to Lindberg, while there are some portions of the classical tradition which suggest this view, these were exceptional cases. It was common to tolerate and encourage critical thinking about the nature of the world. The relation between Christianity and science is complex and cannot be simplified to either harmony or conflict, according to Lindberg. Lindberg reports that "the late medieval scholar rarely experienced the coercive power of the church and would have regarded himself as free (particularly in the natural sciences) to follow reason and observation wherever they led. There was no warfare between science and the church." Ted Peters in Encyclopedia of Religion writes that although there is some truth in the "Galileo's condemnation" story but through exaggerations, it has now become "a modern myth perpetuated by those wishing to see warfare between science and religion who were allegedly persecuted by an atavistic and dogma-bound ecclesiastical authority". In 1992, the Catholic Church's seeming vindication of Galileo attracted much comment in the media:

Generations of historians and sociologists have discovered many ways in which Christians, Christian beliefs, and Christian institutions played crucial roles in fashioning the tenets, methods, and institutions of what in time became modern science. They found that some forms of Christianity provided the motivation to study nature systematically.

— Noah J. Efron

A degree of concord between science and religion can be seen in religious belief and empirical science. The belief that God created the world and therefore humans, can lead to the view that he arranged for humans to know the world. This is underwritten by the doctrine of imago dei. In the words of Thomas Aquinas, "Since human beings are said to be in the image of God in virtue of their having a nature that includes an intellect, such a nature is most in the image of God in virtue of being most able to imitate God".

During the Enlightenment, a period "characterized by dramatic revolutions in science" and the rise of Protestant challenges to the authority of the Catholic Church via individual liberty, the authority of Christian scriptures became strongly challenged. As science advanced, acceptance of a literal version of the Bible became "increasingly untenable" and some in that period presented ways of interpreting scripture according to its spirit on its authority and truth.

Regarding the subject on the distribution of Nobel Prizes by religion between 1901 and 2000, the data taken from Baruch A. Shalev, shows that between the years 1901 and 2000 reveals that 654 Laureates belong to 28 different religion. 65.4% have identified Christianity in its various forms as their religious preference. Overall, Christians have won a total of 78.3% of all the Nobel Prizes in Peace, 72.5% in Chemistry, 65.3% in Physics, 62% in Medicine, 54% in Economics and 49.5% of all Literature awards.

== History ==
=== Roots of the Scientific Revolution ===
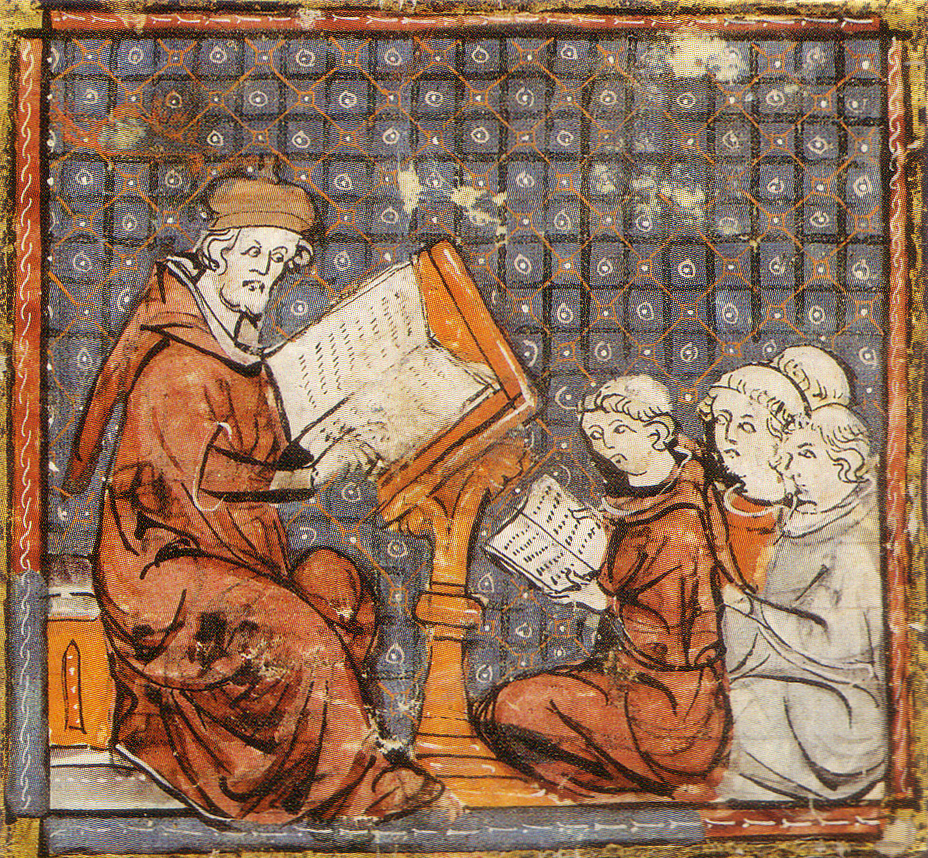
Teaching at University of Paris, in a late 14th-century Grandes Chroniques de France

Between 1150 and 1200, Christian scholars had traveled to Sicily and Spain to retrieve the writings of Aristotle, which had been lost to the West after the Fall of the Roman Empire. This produced a period of cultural ferment that one "modern historian has called the twelfth century renaissance". Thomas Aquinas responded by writing his monumental summas in support of human reason as compatible with faith. Christian theology adapted to Aristotle's secular and humanistic natural philosophy. By the Late Middle Ages, Aquinas's rationalism was being heatedly debated in the new universities. William Ockham resolved the conflict by arguing that faith and reason should be pursued separately so that each could achieve its own end. Historians of science David C. Lindberg, Ronald Numbers and Edward Grant have described what followed as a "medieval scientific revival". Science historian Noah Efron has written that Christianity provided the early "tenets, methods, and institutions of what in time became modern science".

Modern western universities have their origins directly in the Medieval Church. They began as cathedral schools, and all students were considered clerics. This was a benefit as it placed the students under ecclesiastical jurisdiction and thus imparted certain legal immunities and protections. The cathedral schools eventually became partially detached from the cathedrals and formed their own institutions, the earliest being the University of Bologna (1088), the University of Oxford (1096), and the University of Paris (c. 1150).

Some scholars have noted a direct tie between "particular aspects of traditional Christianity" and the rise of science. Other scholars and historians have credited Christianity with laying the foundation for the Scientific Revolution. According to Robert K. Merton, the values of English Puritanism and German Pietism led to the Scientific Revolution of the 17th and 18th centuries. (The Merton Thesis is both widely accepted and disputed.) Merton explained that the connection between religious affiliation and interest in science was the result of a significant synergy between the ascetic Protestant values and those of modern science.

=== Influence of biblical worldviews on early modern science ===
At first, according to Andrew Dickson White's 1896 book A History of the Warfare of Science with Theology in Christendom, a biblical worldview affected negatively the progress of science through time. Dickinson also argues that immediately following the Reformation matters were even worse. The interpretations of Scripture by Luther and Calvin became as sacred to their followers as the Scripture itself. For instance, when Georg Calixtus ventured, in interpreting the Psalms, to question the accepted belief that "the waters above the heavens" were contained in a vast receptacle upheld by a solid vault, he was bitterly denounced as heretical. Today, much of the scholarship in which the conflict thesis was originally based is considered to be inaccurate. For instance, the claim that early Christians rejected scientific findings by the Greco-Romans is false, since the "handmaiden" view of secular studies was seen to shed light on theology. This view was widely adapted throughout the early medieval period and afterwards by theologians (such as Augustine) and ultimately resulted in fostering interest in knowledge about nature through time. Also, the claim that people of the Middle Ages widely believed that the Earth was flat was first propagated in the same period that originated the conflict thesis and is still very common in popular culture. Modern scholars regard this claim as mistaken, as the contemporary historians of science David C. Lindberg and Ronald L. Numbers write: "there was scarcely a Christian scholar of the Middle Ages who did not acknowledge [earth's] sphericity and even know its approximate circumference." From the fall of Rome to the time of Columbus, all major scholars and many vernacular writers interested in the physical shape of the Earth held a spherical view with the exception of Lactantius and Cosmas.

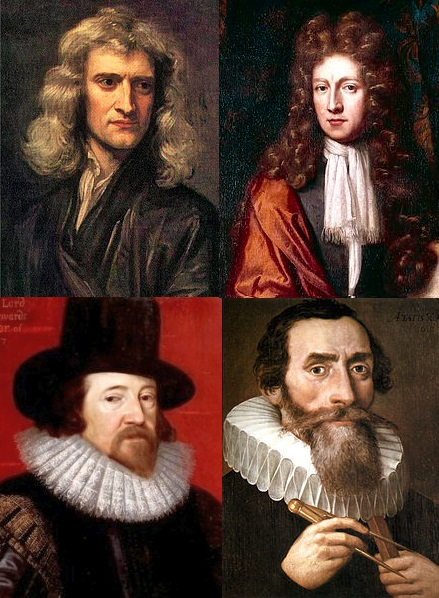
Notable scientists who self-identified as Christians: Isaac Newton, Robert Boyle, Francis Bacon and Johannes Kepler

H. Floris Cohen argued for a biblical Protestant, but not excluding Catholicism, influence on the early development of modern science. He presented Dutch historian R. Hooykaas' argument that a biblical world-view holds all the necessary antidotes for the hubris of Greek rationalism: a respect for manual labour, leading to more experimentation and empiricism, and a supreme God that left nature and open to emulation and manipulation. It supports the idea early modern science rose due to a combination of Greek and biblical thought.

Oxford historian Peter Harrison is another who has argued that a Biblical worldview was significant for the development of modern science. Harrison contends that Protestant approaches to the book of scripture had significant, if largely unintended, consequences for the interpretation of the book of nature. Harrison has also suggested that literal readings of the Genesis narratives of the Creation and Fall motivated and legitimated scientific activity in seventeenth-century England. For many of its seventeenth-century practitioners, science was imagined to be a means of restoring a human dominion over nature that had been lost as a consequence of the Fall.

Historian and professor of religion Eugene M. Klaaren holds that "a belief in divine creation" was central to an emergence of science in seventeenth-century England. The philosopher Michael Foster has published analytical philosophy connecting Christian doctrines of creation with empiricism. Historian William B. Ashworth has argued against the historical notion of distinctive mind-sets and the idea of Catholic and Protestant sciences. Historians James R. Jacob and Margaret C. Jacob have argued for a linkage between seventeenth-century Anglican intellectual transformations and influential English scientists (e.g., Robert Boyle and Isaac Newton). John Dillenberger and Christopher B. Kaiser have written theological surveys, which also cover additional interactions occurring in the eighteenth, nineteenth, and twentieth centuries. Philosopher of Religion, Richard Jones, has written a philosophical critique of the "dependency thesis" which assumes that modern science emerged from Christian sources and doctrines. Though he acknowledges that modern science emerged in a religious framework, that Christianity greatly elevated the importance of science by sanctioning and religiously legitimizing it in medieval period, and that Christianity created a favorable social context for it to grow; he argues that direct Christian beliefs or doctrines were not primary source of scientific pursuits by natural philosophers, nor was Christianity, in and of itself, exclusively or directly necessary in developing or practicing modern science.

Oxford University historian and theologian John Hedley Brooke wrote that "when natural philosophers referred to laws of nature, they were not glibly choosing that metaphor. Laws were the result of legislation by an intelligent deity. Thus, the philosopher René Descartes (1596–1650) insisted that he was discovering the "laws that God has put into nature." Later Newton would declare that the regulation of the Solar System presupposed the "counsel and dominion of an intelligent and powerful Being." Historian Ronald L. Numbers stated that this thesis "received a boost" from mathematician and philosopher Alfred North Whitehead's Science and the Modern World (1925). Numbers has also argued, "Despite the manifest shortcomings of the claim that Christianity gave birth to science—most glaringly, it ignores or minimizes the contributions of ancient Greeks and medieval Muslims—it too, refuses to succumb to the death it deserves." The sociologist Rodney Stark of Baylor University, argued in contrast that "Christian theology was essential for the rise of science."

=== Reconciliation in Britain in the early 20th century ===
In Reconciling Science and Religion: The Debate in Early-twentieth-century Britain, historian of biology Peter J. Bowler argues that in contrast to the conflicts between science and religion in the U.S. in the 1920s (most famously the Scopes Trial), during this period Great Britain experienced a concerted effort at reconciliation, championed by intellectually conservative scientists, supported by liberal theologians but opposed by younger scientists and secularists and conservative Christians. These attempts at reconciliation fell apart in the 1930s due to increased social tensions, moves towards neo-orthodox theology and the acceptance of the modern evolutionary synthesis.

In the twentieth century, several ecumenical organizations promoting a harmony between science and Christianity were founded, most notably the American Scientific Affiliation, The Biologos Foundation, Christians in Science, The Society of Ordained Scientists, and The Veritas Forum.

== Branches of Christianity ==
=== Catholicism ===
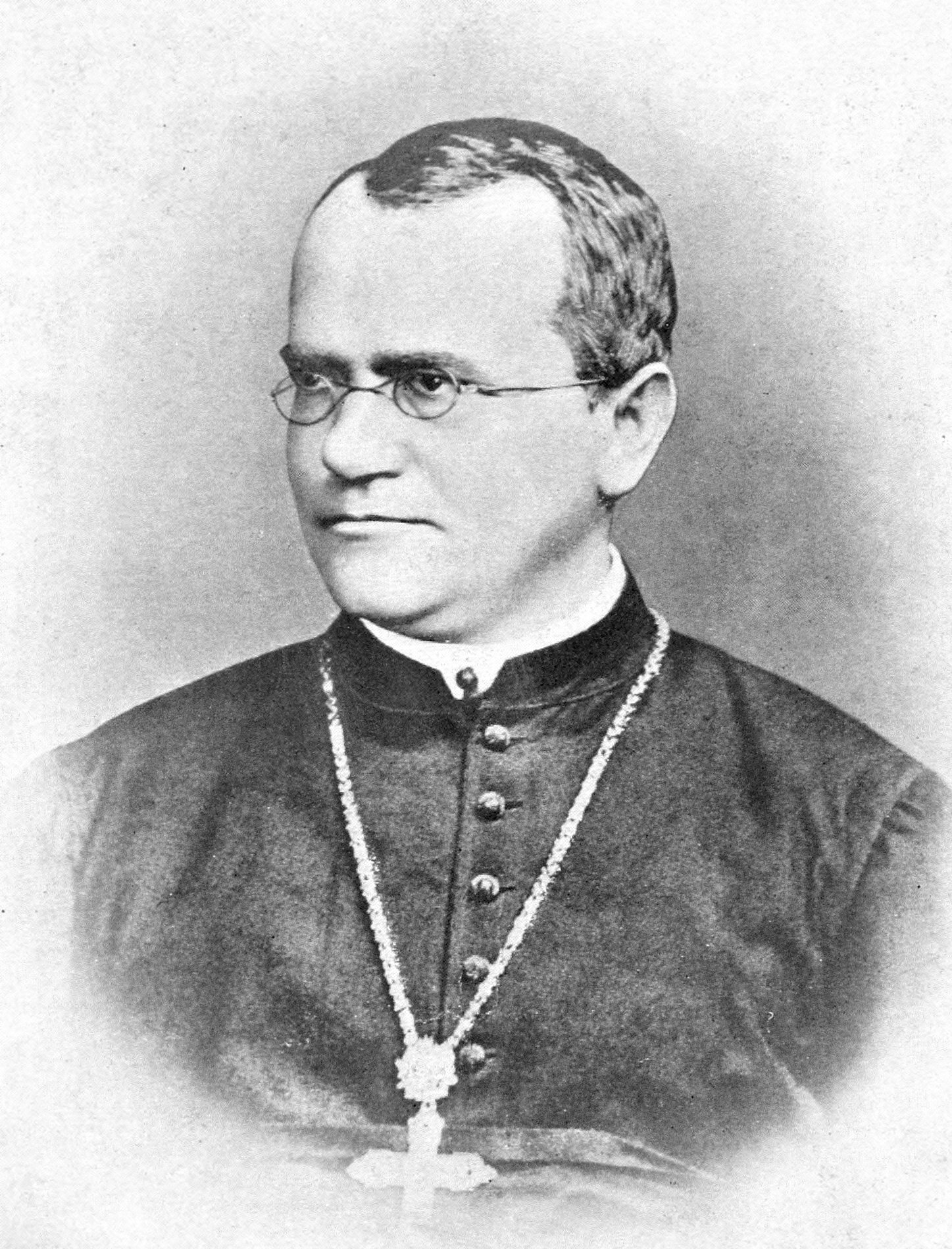
Gregor Mendel, Augustinian Friar and scientist, who developed theories on genetics for the first time

While refined and clarified over the centuries, the Catholic position on the relationship between science and religion is one of harmony and has maintained the teaching of natural law as set forth by Thomas Aquinas. For example, regarding scientific study such as that of evolution, the church's unofficial position is an example of theistic evolution, stating that faith and scientific findings regarding human evolution are not in conflict, though humans are regarded as a special creation, and that the existence of God is required to explain both monogenism and the spiritual component of human origins. Catholic schools have included all manners of scientific study in their curriculum for many centuries. Historian John Heilbron says that "The Roman Catholic Church gave more financial and social support to the study of astronomy for over six centuries, from the recovery of ancient learning during the late Middle Ages into the Enlightenment, then any other, and probably all, other Institutions."

The first universities in Europe were established by Catholic Church monks. The first Western European institutions generally considered to be universities were established in present-day Italy (including the Kingdom of Sicily, the Kingdom of Naples, and the Kingdom of Italy), the Kingdom of England, the Kingdom of France, Holy Roman Empire, the Kingdom of Spain, the Kingdom of Portugal and the Kingdom of Scotland between the 11th and 15th centuries for the study of the arts and the higher disciplines of theology, law, and medicine. These universities evolved from much older Christian cathedral schools and monastic schools, and it is difficult to define the exact date when they became true universities, though the lists of studia generalia for higher education in Europe held by the Vatican are a useful guide:

Today almost all historians agree that Christianity (Catholicism as well Protestantism) moved many early-modem intellectuals to study nature systematically. Historians have also found that notions borrowed from Christian belief found their ways into scientific discourse, with glorious results.

— Noah J. Efron

Galileo once stated "The intention of the Holy Spirit is to teach us how to go to heaven, not how the heavens go." In 1981, John Paul II, then pope of the Catholic Church, spoke of the relationship this way: "The Bible itself speaks to us of the origin of the universe and its make-up, not in order to provide us with a scientific treatise, but in order to state the correct relationships of Man with God and with the universe. Sacred Scripture wishes simply to declare that the world was created by God, and in order to teach this truth it expresses itself in the terms of the cosmology in use at the time of the writer". The influence of the Church on Western letters and learning has been formidable. The ancient texts of the Bible have deeply influenced Western art, literature and culture. For centuries following the collapse of the Western Roman Empire, small monastic communities were practically the only outposts of literacy in Western Europe. In time, the cathedral schools developed into Europe's earliest universities and the church has established thousands of primary, secondary and tertiary institutions throughout the world in the centuries since. The Church and clergymen have also sought at different times to censor texts and scholars. Thus, different schools of opinion exist as to the role and influence of the Church in relation to western letters and learning.

One view, first propounded by Enlightenment philosophers, asserts that the Church's doctrines are entirely superstitious and have hindered the progress of civilization. Communist states have made similar arguments in their education in order to inculcate a negative view of Catholicism (and religion in general) in their citizens. The most famous incidents cited by such critics are narratives of the Church in relation to Copernicus, Galileo Galilei and Johannes Kepler.

In opposition to this view, some historians of science, including non-Catholics such as J.L. Heilbron, A.C. Crombie, David Lindberg, Edward Grant, Thomas Goldstein, and Ted Davis, have argued that the Church had a significant, positive influence on the development of Western civilization. They hold that, not only did monks save and cultivate the remnants of ancient civilization during the barbarian invasions, but that the Church promoted learning and science through its sponsorship of many universities which, under its leadership, grew rapidly in Europe in the eleventh and twelfth centuries. St.Thomas Aquinas, the Church's "model theologian," argued that reason is in harmony with faith, and that reason can contribute to a deeper understanding of revelation, and so encouraged intellectual development. The Church's priest-scientists, many of whom were Jesuits, have been among the leading lights in astronomy, genetics, geomagnetism, meteorology, seismology, and solar physics, becoming some of the "fathers" of these sciences. Examples include important churchmen such as the Augustinian abbot Gregor Mendel (pioneer in the study of genetics), Roger Bacon (a Franciscan friar who was one of the early advocates of the scientific method), and Belgian priest Georges Lemaître (the first to propose the Big Bang theory; see Religious interpretations of the Big Bang theory). Other notable priest scientists have included Albertus Magnus, Robert Grosseteste, Nicholas Steno, Francesco Grimaldi, Giambattista Riccioli, Roger Boscovich, and Athanasius Kircher. Even more numerous are Catholic laity involved in science: Henri Becquerel who discovered radioactivity; Galvani, Volta, Ampere, Marconi, pioneers in electricity and telecommunications; Lavoisier, "father of modern chemistry"; Vesalius, founder of modern human anatomy; and Cauchy, one of the mathematicians who laid the rigorous foundations of calculus.

Throughout history many Catholic clerics have made significant contributions to science. These cleric-scientists include Nicolaus Copernicus, Gregor Mendel, Georges Lemaître, Albertus Magnus, Roger Bacon, Pierre Gassendi, Roger Joseph Boscovich, Marin Mersenne, Bernard Bolzano, Francesco Maria Grimaldi, Nicole Oresme, Jean Buridan, Robert Grosseteste, Christopher Clavius, Nicolas Steno, Athanasius Kircher, Giovanni Battista Riccioli, William of Ockham, and others. The Catholic Church has also produced many lay scientists and mathematicians.

==== Cistercian in science ====
Numbers written with Cistercian numerals. From left to right: 1 in units place, 2 in tens place (20), 3 in hundreds place (300), 4 in thousands place (4000), then compound numbers 5555, 6789, 9394.

The Catholic Cistercian order used its own numbering system, which could express numbers from 0 to 9999 in a single sign. According to one modern Cistercian, "enterprise and entrepreneurial spirit" have always been a part of the order's identity, and the Cistercians "were catalysts for development of a market economy" in twelfth-century Europe. Until the Industrial Revolution, most of the technological advances in Europe were made in the monasteries. According to the medievalist Jean Gimpel, their high level of industrial technology facilitated the diffusion of new techniques: "Every monastery had a model factory, often as large as the church and only several feet away, and waterpower drove the machinery of the various industries located on its floor." Waterpower was used for crushing wheat, sieving flour, fulling cloth and tanning – a "level of technological achievement [that] could have been observed in practically all" of the Cistercian monasteries.

The English science historian James Burke examines the impact of Cistercian waterpower, derived from Roman watermill technology such as that of Barbegal aqueduct and mill near Arles in the fourth of his ten-part Connections TV series, called "Faith in Numbers". The Cistercians made major contributions to culture and technology in medieval Europe: Cistercian architecture is considered one of the most beautiful styles of medieval architecture; and the Cistercians were the main force of technological diffusion in fields such as agriculture and hydraulic engineering.

==== Jesuits in science ====
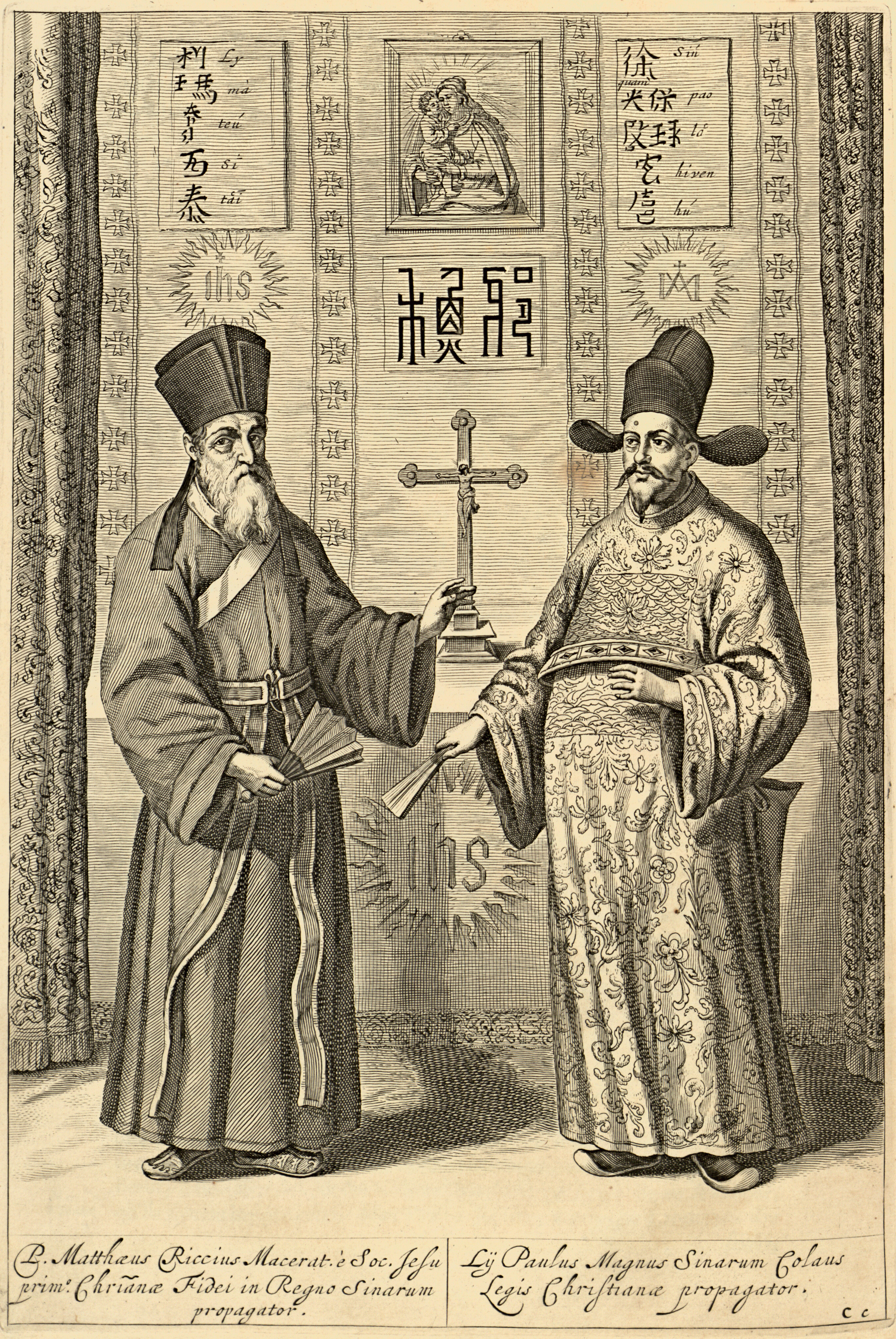
Matteo Ricci (left) and Xu Guangqi (right) in the Chinese edition of Euclid's Elements published in 1607

Between the sixteenth and eighteenth centuries, the teaching of science in Jesuit schools, as laid down in the Ratio atque Institutio Studiorum Societatis Iesu ("The Official Plan of studies for the Society of Jesus") of 1599, was almost entirely based on the works of Aristotle.

The Jesuits, nevertheless, have made numerous significant contributions to the development of science. For example, the Jesuits have dedicated significant study to earthquakes, and seismology has been described as "the Jesuit science". The Jesuits have been described as "the single most important contributor to experimental physics in the seventeenth century". According to Jonathan Wright in his book God's Soldiers, by the eighteenth century the Jesuits had "contributed to the development of pendulum clocks, pantographs, barometers, reflecting telescopes and microscopes, to scientific fields as various as magnetism, optics and electricity. They observed, in some cases before anyone else, the colored bands on Jupiter's surface, the Andromeda nebula and Saturn's rings. They theorized about the circulation of the blood (independently of Harvey), the theoretical possibility of flight, the way the moon affected the tides, and the wave-like nature of light."

The Jesuit China missions of the sixteenth and seventeenth centuries introduced Western science and astronomy, then undergoing its own revolution, to China. One modern historian writes that in late Ming courts, the Jesuits were "regarded as impressive especially for their knowledge of astronomy, calendar-making, mathematics, hydraulics, and geography". The Society of Jesus introduced, according to Thomas Woods, "a substantial body of scientific knowledge and a vast array of mental tools for understanding the physical universe, including the Euclidean geometry that made planetary motion comprehensible". Another expert quoted by Woods said the Scientific Revolution brought by the Jesuits coincided with a time when science was at a very low level in China.

The missionary efforts and other work of the Society of Jesus, or Jesuits, between the 16th and 17th century played a significant role in continuing the transmission of knowledge, science, and culture between China and the West, and influenced Christian culture in Chinese society today.

=== Protestant influence ===
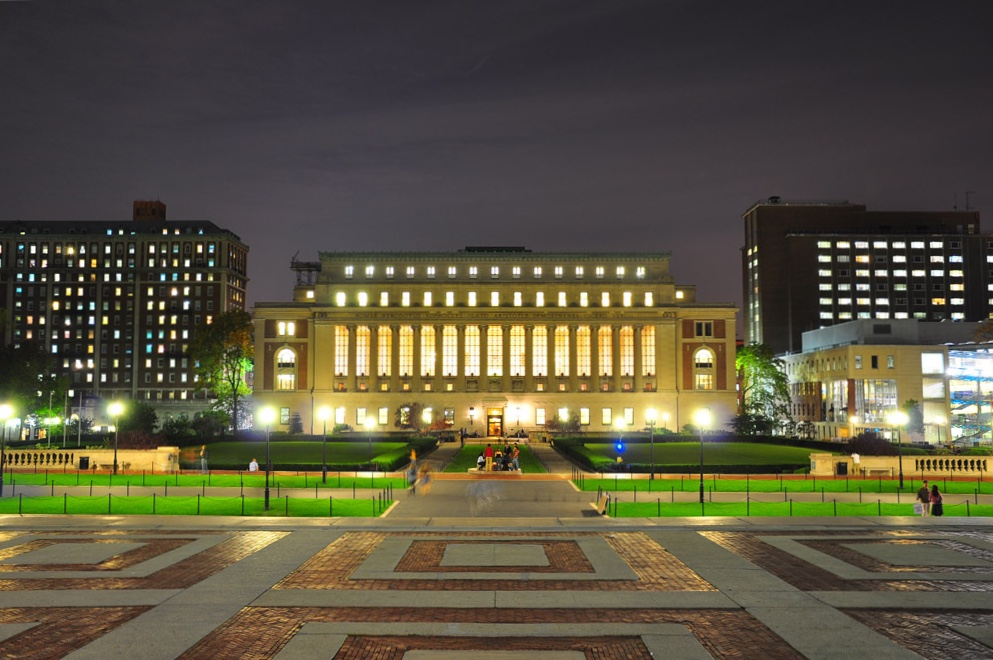
Columbia University was established by the Church of England.

Protestantism has promoted economic growth and entrepreneurship, especially in the period after the Scientific and the Industrial Revolution. Scholars have identified a positive correlation between the rise of Protestantism and human capital formation, work ethic, economic development, and the development of the state system.

Protestantism had an important influence on science, according to the Merton thesis there was a positive correlation between the rise of Puritanism and Protestant Pietism on the one hand and early experimental science on the other. The Merton thesis has two separate parts: Firstly, it presents a theory that science changes due to an accumulation of observations and improvement in experimental techniques and methodology; secondly, it puts forward the argument that the popularity of science in seventeenth-century England and the religious demography of the Royal Society (English scientists of that time were predominantly Puritans or other Protestants) can be explained by a correlation between Protestantism and the scientific values. In his theory, Robert K. Merton focused on English Puritanism and German Pietism as having been responsible for the development of the Scientific Revolution of the seventeenth and eighteenth centuries. Merton explained that the connection between religious affiliation and interest in science was the result of a significant synergy between the ascetic Protestant values and those of modern science. Protestant values encouraged scientific research by allowing science to study God's influence on the world and thus providing a religious justification for scientific research.

According of Scientific Elite: Nobel Laureates in the United States by Harriet Zuckerman, a review of American Nobel Prize winners awarded between 1901 and 1972, 72% of American Nobel Prize laureates, have identified from Protestant background. Overall, Americans of Protestant background have won a total of 84.2% of all awarded Nobel Prizes in Chemistry, 60% in Medicine, 58.6% in Physics, between 1901 and 1972.

Some of the first colleges and universities in America, including Harvard, Yale, Princeton, Columbia, Dartmouth, Pennsylvania, Duke, Boston, Williams, Bowdoin, Middlebury, and Amherst, all were founded by mainline Protestant denominations.

==== Quakers in science ====
The Religious Society of Friends, commonly known as Quakers, encouraged some values which may have been conducive to encouraging scientific talents. A theory suggested by David Hackett Fischer in his book Albion's Seed indicated early Quakers in the US preferred "practical study" to the more traditional studies of Greek or Latin popular with the elite. Another theory suggests their avoidance of dogma or clergy gave them a greater flexibility in response to science.

Despite those arguments a major factor is agreed to be that the Quakers were initially discouraged or forbidden to go to the major law or humanities schools in Britain due to the Test Act. They also at times faced similar discriminations in the United States, as many of the colonial universities had a Puritan or Anglican orientation. This led them to attend "Godless" institutions or forced them to rely on hands-on scientific experimentation rather than academia.

Because of these issues it has been stated Quakers are better represented in science than most religions. There are sources, Pendlehill (Thomas 2000) and Encyclopædia Britannica, that indicate that for over two centuries they were overrepresented in the Royal Society. Mention is made of this possibility in studies referenced in religiosity and intellince and in a book by Arthur Raistrick. Whether this is still accurate, there have been several noteworthy members of this denomination in science. The following names a few.

=== Eastern Christian influence ===
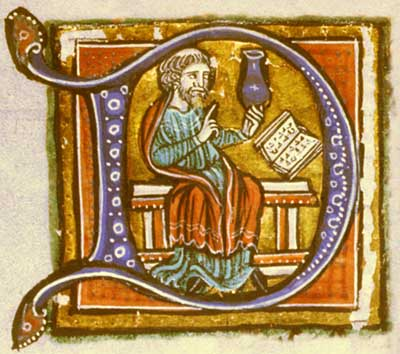
luminure from the Hunayn ibn-Ishaq al-'Ibadi manuscript of the Isagoge. Hunayn ibn-Ishaq a famous and influential Christian scholar, physician, and scientist of ethnic Arab descent.

Christian scientists and scholars (particularly Nestorian and Jacobite Christians) contributed to the Arab Islamic Civilization during the Umayyad and the Abbasid periods by translating works of Greek philosophers to Syriac and afterwards to Arabic. Over a century and a half, primarily Middle Eastern Oriental Syriac Christian scholars in House of Wisdom translated all scientific and philosophic Greek texts into Arabic language in the House of Wisdom. They also excelled in philosophy, science (Masawaiyh, Eutychius of Alexandria, and Jabril ibn Bukhtishu) and theology (such as Tatian, Bardaisan, Babai the Great, Nestorius, and Thomas of Marga) and the personal physicians of the Abbasid Caliphs were often Christians, such as the long-serving Bukhtishu dynasty. Many scholars of the House of Wisdom were of Assyrian Christian background.

Among the Copts in Egypt, every monastery and probably every church once had its own library of manuscripts.

In the fifth century AD, nine Christian Syrian Monks translated Greek, Hebrew, and Syriac works into the Ethiopian language of Ge'ez and organized Christian monastic orders and schools, some of which are still in existence today. By the sixth century AD, Assyrian Christians had begun exporting back to the Byzantine Empire their own works on science, philosophy and medicine. the literary output of the Assyrians was vast. The third largest corpus of Christian writing, after Latin and Greek, is by the Assyrians in the Assyrian language. In the field of medicine, the Assyrian Bukhtishu family produced nine generations of physicians, and founded the great medical school at Gundeshapur in Iran. When Abbasid Caliph al-Mansur became ill and no physician in Baghdad could cure him, he sent for the dean of the medical school in Gundeshapur, which was renowned as the best of its time The Assyrian philosopher Job of Edessa developed a physical theory of the universe, in the Assyrian language, that rivaled Aristotle's theory, and that sought to replace matter with forces (a theory that anticipated some ideas in quantum mechanics, such as the spontaneous creation and destruction of matter that occurs in the quantum vacuum). One of the greatest Assyrian achievements of the fourth century was the founding of one of the oldest universities in the world, the School of Nisibis, which had three departments, theology, philosophy and medicine, and which became a magnet and center of intellectual development in the Middle East. The statutes of the School of Nisibis, which have been preserved, later became the model upon which the first Italian university was based. The first Mongolian writing system (which was first set down by assyiran monks) used the Assyrian Aramaic and Syriac alphabets, with the name "Tora Bora" being an Assyrian phrase meaning "arid mountain." The hierarchical structure of Buddhism is modeled after the Church of the East. The Assyrian Christian Stephanos translated the work of Greek physician Pedanius Dioscorides into the Arabic language, and for over a century, this translated medical text was used by the Muslim states.

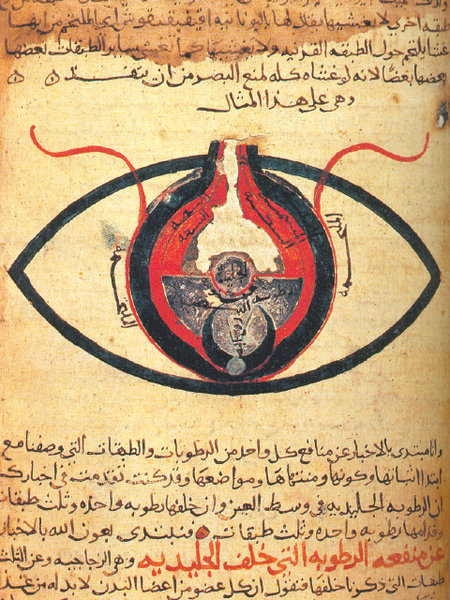
The eye according to Hunayn ibn Ishaq, c. 1200

In the field of Optics, Nestorian Christian Hunayn ibn-Ishaq's textbook on ophthalmology called the Ten Treatises on the Eye, which was written in 950 A.D., remained the authoritative source on the subject in the western world until the 1800s.

It was a Christian scholar and Bishop from Nisibis named Severus Sebokht who was the first to describe and incorporate Indian mathematical symbols in the mid 7th century, which were then adopted into Islamic culture and are now known as the Arabic numerals.

During the fourth through the seventh centuries, scholarly work in the Syriac and Greek languages was either newly initiated, or carried on from the Hellenistic period. Centers of learning and of transmission of classical wisdom included colleges such as the School of Nisibis, and later the School of Edessa, and the renowned hospital and medical academy of Jundishapur; libraries included the Library of Alexandria and the Imperial Library of Constantinople; other centers of translation and learning functioned at Merv, Salonika, Nishapur and Ctesiphon, situated just south of what later became Baghdad. The House of Wisdom was a library, translation institute, and academy established in Abbasid-era Baghdad, Iraq. Nestorians played a prominent role in the formation of Arab culture, with the Jundishapur school being prominent in the late Sassanid, Umayyad and early Abbasid periods. The distinguished historian of science George Sarton called Jundishapur "the greatest intellectual center of the time." Notably, eight generations of the Nestorian Bukhtishu family served as private doctors to caliphs and sultans between the eighth and eleventh centuries.

The common and persistent myth claiming that Islamic scholars "saved" the classical work of Aristotle and other Greek philosophers from destruction and then graciously passed it on to Europe is baseless. According to the myth, these works would otherwise have perished in the long European Dark Age between the fifth and tenth centuries. Ancient Greek texts and Greek culture were never "lost" to be somehow "recovered" and "transmitted" by Islamic scholars, as many keep claiming: the texts were always there, preserved and studied by the scholars and monks of the Byzantines and passed on to the rest of Europe and to the Islamic world at various times. Aristotle had been translated in France at the abbey of Mont Saint-Michel before translations of Aristotle into Arabic (via the Syriac of the Christian scholars from the conquered lands of the Byzantine Empire). Michael Harris points out:

The great writings of the classical era, particularly those of Greece ... were always available to the Byzantines and to those Western peoples in cultural and diplomatic contact with the Eastern Empire.... Of the Greek classics known today, at least seventy-five percent are known through Byzantine copies.

Historian John Julius Norwich adds that “much of what we know about antiquity—especially Hellenic and Roman literature and Roman law—would have been lost forever if it weren't for the scholars and scribes of Constantinople.”

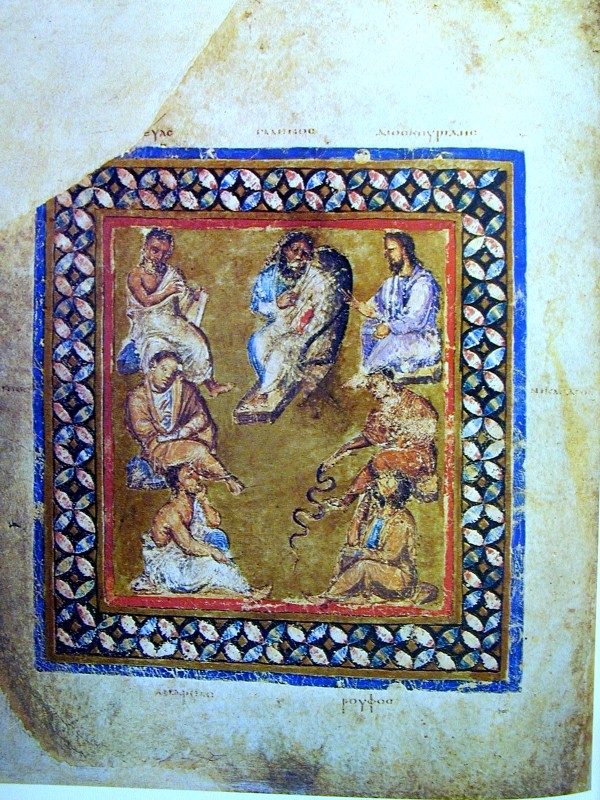
The frontispiece of the Vienna Dioscurides shows a set of seven famous Byzantine physicians.

The Byzantine science played an important role in the transmission of classical knowledge to the Islamic world and to Renaissance Italy, and also in the transmission of Islamic science to Renaissance Italy. Many of the most distinguished classical scholars held high office in the Eastern Orthodox Church. The migration waves of Byzantine scholars and émigrés in the period following the Crusader sacking of Constantinople in 1204 and the end of the Byzantine Empire in 1453, is considered by many scholars key to the revival of Greek and Roman studies that led to the development of the Renaissance humanism and science. These émigrés brought to Western Europe the relatively well-preserved remnants and accumulated knowledge of their own (Greek) civilization, which had mostly not survived the Early Middle Ages in the West. According to the Encyclopædia Britannica: "Many modern scholars also agree that the exodus of Greeks to Italy as a result of this event marked the end of the Middle Ages and the beginning of the Renaissance". The Byzantines pioneered the concept of the hospital as an institution offering medical care and the possibility of a cure for the patients, as a reflection of the ideals of Christian charity, rather than merely a place to die.

Paper, which the Muslims received from China in the eighth century, was being used in the Byzantine Empire by the ninth century. There were very large private libraries, and monasteries possessed huge libraries with hundreds of books that were lent to people in each monastery's region. Thus were preserved the works of classical antiquity.

When Saint Cyril was sent by the Byzantine emperor in an embassy to the Arabs in the ninth century, he astonished his Muslim hosts with his knowledge of philosophy and science as well as theology. Historian Maria Mavroudi recounts:

When asked how it was possible for him to know all that he did, he [Cyril] drew an analogy between the Muslim reaction to his erudition and the pride of someone who kept sea water in a wine skin and boasted of possessing a rare liquid. He finally encountered someone from a region by the sea, who explained that only a madman would brag about the contents of the wine skin, since people from his own homeland possessed an endless abundance of sea water. The Muslims are like the man with the wine skin and the [Greeks] like the man from the sea because, according to the saint's concluding remark in his response, all learning emanated from the [Greeks].

== Perspectives on evolution ==
In recent history, the theory of evolution has been at the centre of controversy between Christianity and science, largely in America. Christians who accept a literal interpretation of the biblical account of creation find incompatibility between Darwinian evolution and their interpretation of the Christian faith. Creation science or scientific creationism is a branch of creationism that attempts to provide scientific support for the Genesis creation narrative in the Book of Genesis and attempts to disprove generally accepted scientific facts, theories and scientific paradigms about the geological history of Earth, formation of the Solar System, Big Bang cosmology, the chemical origins of life and evolution. It began in the 1960s as a fundamentalist Christian effort in the United States to prove Biblical inerrancy and falsify the scientific evidence for evolution. It has since developed a sizable religious following in the United States, with creation science ministries branching worldwide. In 1925, The State of Tennessee passed the Butler Act, which prohibited the teaching of the theory of evolution in all schools in the state. Later that year, a similar law was passed in Mississippi, and likewise, Arkansas in 1927. In 1968, these "anti-monkey" laws were struck down by the Supreme Court of the United States as unconstitutional, "because they established a religious doctrine violating both the First and Fourth Amendments to the Constitution."

Most scientists have rejected creation science for several reasons, including that its claims do not refer to natural causes and cannot be tested. In 1987, the United States Supreme Court ruled that creationism is religion, not science, and cannot be advocated in public school classrooms.

Theistic evolution is a discipline that accepts the current scientific understanding of the age of the Earth and the theory of evolution. It includes a range of beliefs, including views described as evolutionary creationism, which accepts contemporary science, but also upholds classical religious understandings of God and creation in Christian context. This position has been endorsed by the Catholic Church. Proponents of theistic evolution include Founder of BioLogos, Francis Collins, Prominent conservative Christian Theologian, Tim Keller, and prominent Christian philosopher Alvin Plantinga. The philosopher and theologian William Lane Craig denies being an adherent of theistic evolution, but he also does not rule it out. He declares himself "agnostic" on the subject. In his book In Quest of the Historical Adam, he defends an approach to Genesis that is compatible with evolution.

== Modern reception ==
=== Individual scientists' views ===
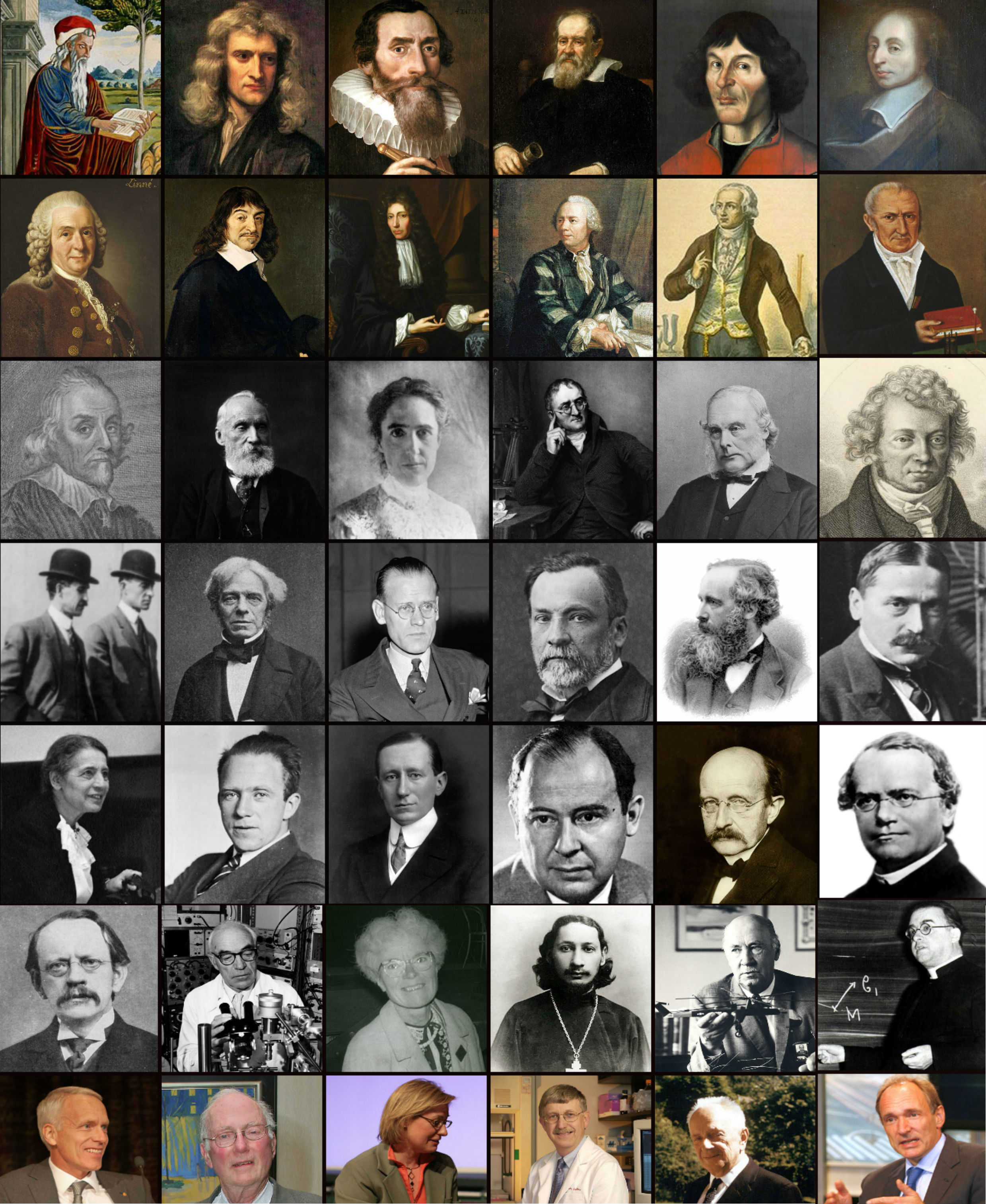
A number of notable Christian scientists and inventors

Christian Scholars and Scientists have made noted contributions to science and technology fields, as well as medicine, both historically and in modern times. Many well-known historical figures who influenced Western science considered themselves Christian such as Nicolaus Copernicus, Galileo Galilei, Johannes Kepler, Isaac Newton Robert Boyle, Francis Bacon, Gottfried Wilhelm Leibniz, Emanuel Swedenborg, Alessandro Volta, Carl Friedrich Gauss, Antoine Lavoisier, André-Marie Ampère, John Dalton, James Clerk Maxwell, William Thomson, 1st Baron Kelvin, Louis Pasteur, Michael Faraday, J. J. Thomson, John Polkinghorne and Juan Maldacena

Isaac Newton, for example, believed that gravity caused the planets to revolve about the Sun, and credited God with the design. In the concluding General Scholium to the Philosophiae Naturalis Principia Mathematica, he wrote: "This most beautiful System of the Sun, Planets and Comets, could only proceed from the counsel and dominion of an intelligent and powerful being." Other famous founders of science who adhered to Christian beliefs include Galileo, Johannes Kepler, René Descartes, Blaise Pascal, and others.

Throughout history many Catholic clerics have made significant contributions to science. These cleric-scientists include Nicolaus Copernicus, Gregor Mendel, Georges Lemaître, Albertus Magnus, Roger Bacon, Pierre Gassendi, Roger Joseph Boscovich, Marin Mersenne, Bernard Bolzano, Francesco Maria Grimaldi, Nicole Oresme, Jean Buridan, Robert Grosseteste, Christopher Clavius, Nicolas Steno, Athanasius Kircher, Giovanni Battista Riccioli, William of Ockham, and others. The Catholic Church has also produced many lay scientists and mathematicians.

Prominent modern scientists advocating Christian belief include Nobel Prize–winning physicists Charles Townes (United Church of Christ member) and William Daniel Phillips (United Methodist Church member), evangelical Christian and past head of the Human Genome Project Francis Collins, and climatologist John T. Houghton.

=== Scientific Revolution ===
"When natural philosophers referred to laws of nature, they were not glibly choosing that metaphor. Laws were the result of legislation by an intelligent deity."

— John Hedley Brooke, Science and Religion: Some Historical Perspectives (1991)

In Science and the Modern World, Alfred North Whitehead argued that modern science inherited a "faith" in the power of human reason from medieval scholastics. Other scholars have noted a direct tie between "particular aspects of traditional Christianity" and the rise of science. For example, historian Peter Harrison argues that Christianity contributed to the rise of the Scientific Revolution because many of its key figures had deeply held religious convictions and believed "themselves to be champions of a science that was more compatible with Christianity than the medieval ideas about the natural world that they replaced." In The Origins of Modern Science, Herbert Butterfield observes that "the Christians helped the cause of modern rationalism by their jealous determination to sweep out of the world all miracles and magic except their own." Copernicus, Kepler, Galileo, and Newton all sincerely believed that the order and perfection of the universe were reflections of the perfection of its Creator. Far from perceiving their work as irreligious, they saw uncovering the hidden perfection of the universe using mathematics as an act of devout worship.

=== Nobel Prize ===
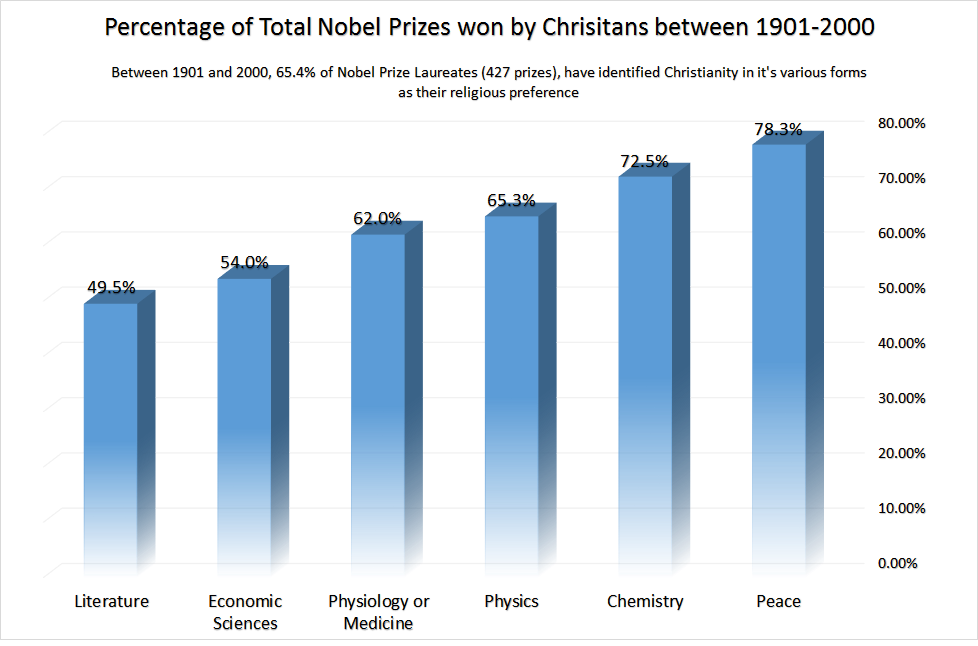
Distribution of Christians in Nobel Prizes between 1901 and 2000

According to 100 Years of Nobel Prizes a review of Nobel prizes award between 1901 and 2000 reveals that 65.4% of Nobel Prizes Laureates, have identified Christianity in its various forms as their religious preference (427 prizes). Overall, Christians are considered a total of 72.5% in Chemistry between 1901 and 2000, 65.3% in Physics, 62% in Medicine, 54% in Economics. Between 1901 and 2000 it was revealed that among 654 Laureates 31.9% have identified as Protestant in its various forms (208 prize), 20.3% were Christians (no information about their denominations; 133 prize), 11.6% have identified as Catholic and 1.6% have identified as Eastern Orthodox. Although Christians make up over 33.2% of the world's population, they have won a total of 65.4% of all Nobel prizes between 1901 and 2000.

In an estimate by scholar Benjamin Beit-Hallahmi, between 1901 and 2001, about 57.1% of Nobel Prize winners were either Christians or with a Christian background. Between 1901 and 2001, about 56.5% of laureates in scientific fields were Christians. According to scholar Benjamin Beit-Hallahmi, Protestants were overrepresented in scientific categories and Catholics were well-represented in the Literature and Peace categories.

In an estimate made by Weijia Zhang from Arizona State University and Robert G. Fuller from University of Nebraska–Lincoln, between 1901 and 1990, 60% of Physics Nobel prize winners had Christian backgrounds.

According of Scientific Elite: Nobel Laureates in the United States by Harriet Zuckerman, a review of American Nobel prizes winners awarded between 1901 and 1972, 72% of American Nobel Prize Laureates, have identified from Protestant background. Overall, Americans of Protestant background have won a total of 84.2% of all awarded Nobel Prizes in Chemistry, 60% in Medicine, 58.6% in Physics, between 1901 and 1972.

=== Criticism ===
Events in Christian Europe, such as the Galileo affair, that were associated with the Scientific Revolution and the Age of Enlightenment led scholars such as John William Draper to postulate a conflict thesis, holding that religion and science have been in conflict methodologically, factually and politically throughout history. This thesis is held by several scientists like Richard Dawkins and Lawrence Krauss. While the conflict thesis remains popular in atheistic and antireligious circles, it has lost favor among most contemporary historians of science, and the majority of scientists in elite universities in the U.S. do not hold a conflict view.

More recently, Thomas E. Woods, Jr., asserts that, despite the widely held conception of the Catholic Church as being anti-science, this conventional wisdom has been the subject of "drastic revision" by historians of science over the last 50 years. Woods asserts that the mainstream view now is that the "Church [has] played a positive role in the development of science ... even if this new consensus has not yet managed to trickle down to the general public." Science historian Ronald L. Numbers corroborates this view, writing that "Historians of science have known for years that White's and Draper's accounts are more propaganda than history. ...Yet the message has rarely escaped the ivory tower."

While figures like John William Draper and Andrew Dickson White are frequently cited in historical literature as the primary architects of the conflict thesis, historian James C. Ungureanu demonstrates this attribution is fundamentally misleading. In his work, Science, Religion, and the Protestant Tradition: Retracing the Origins of Conflict (2019), Ungureanu reveals that Draper and White were not, in fact, original theorists but rather popularizers who synthesized and amplified pre-existing 19th-century Protestant, anti-Catholic polemic. Ungureanu argues that both authors extensively borrowed rhetorical frameworks and historical examples crafted by progressive liberal theologians engaged in intra-Protestant debates seeking to reform Christianity against perceived Catholic-like dogmatism. Their influential narratives, therefore, were less objective historical accounts and more theologically motivated constructs, shaped by specific religious controversies (particularly anti-Catholicism and liberal Protestant agendas), thus undercutting the thesis's claim to universal historical truth. Ungureanu's scholarship reframes the origins of the conflict narrative as a product of partisan religious discourse rather than a neutral reading of the past.

==== Trial of Galileo ====
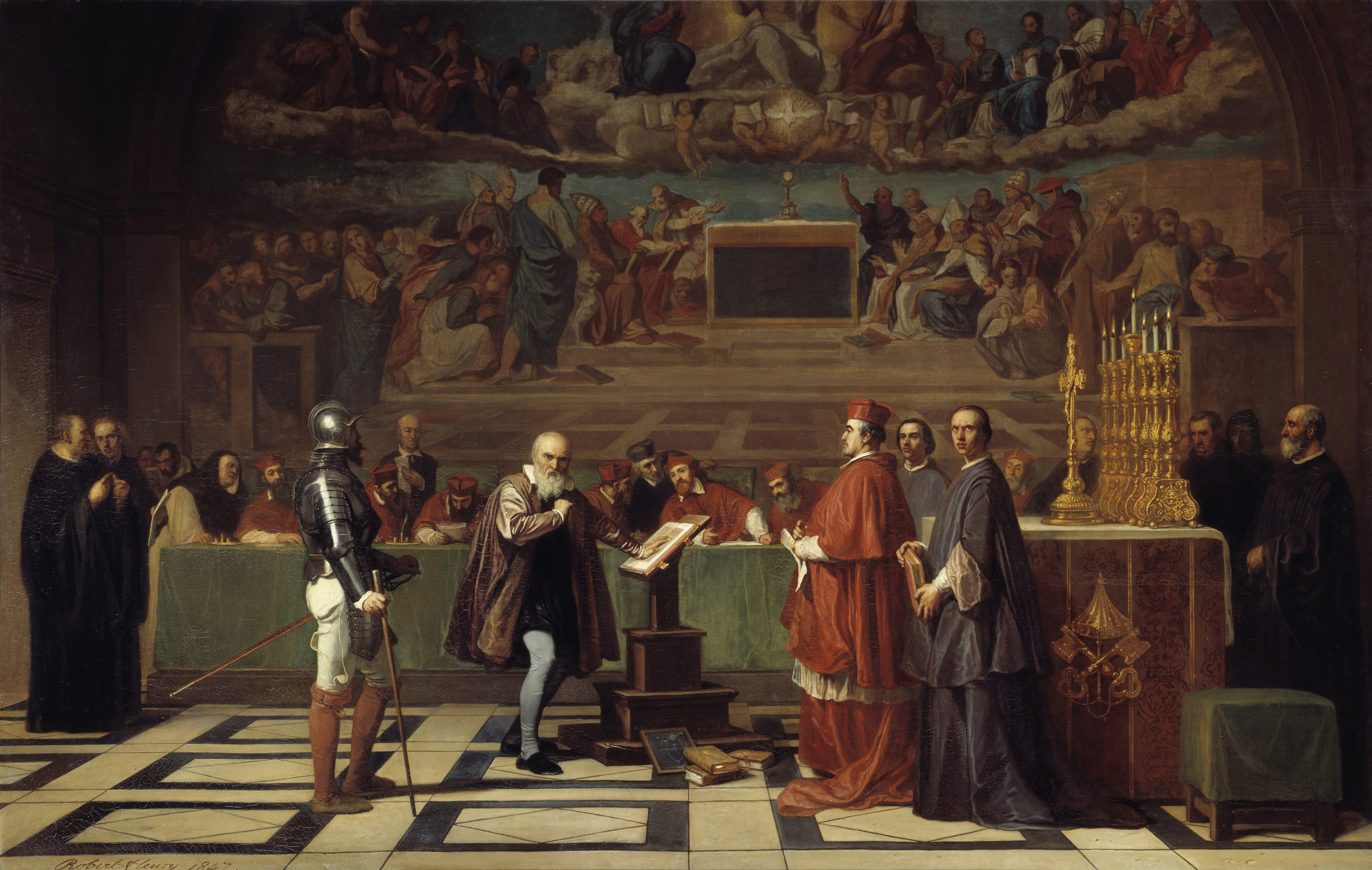
Galileo before the Holy Office, a 19th-century painting by Joseph-Nicolas Robert-Fleury

In 1610, Galileo published his Sidereus Nuncius (Starry Messenger), describing observations made with his new telescope. These and other discoveries exposed difficulties with the understanding of the heavens that was common at the time. Scientists, along with the Catholic Church, had adopted Aristotle's view of the Earth as fixed in place, since Aristotle's rediscovery 300 years prior. Jeffrey Foss said that, by Galileo's time, the Aristotelian-Ptolemaic view of the universe had become "fully integrated with Catholic theology".

Scientists of the day largely rejected Galileo's assertions, since most had no telescope, and Galileo had no physical theory to explain how planets could orbit the Sun which, according to Aristotelian physics, was impossible. (That would not be resolved for another hundred years.) Galileo's peers alerted religious authorities to his "errors" and asked them to intervene. In response, the church forbade Galileo from teaching it, though it did not forbid discussing it, so long as it was clear it was merely a hypothesis. Galileo published books and asserted scientific superiority. He was summoned before the Roman Inquisition twice. First warned, he was next sentenced to house arrest on a charge of "grave suspicion of heresy".

The Galileo affair has been considered by many to be a defining moment in the history of the relationship between religion and science. Since the creation of the Conflict thesis by Andrew Dickson White and John William Draper in the late nineteenth century, religion has been depicted as oppressive and oppositional to science. Edward Daub explains that, while "twentieth century historians of science dismantled White and Draper's claims, it is still popular in public perception". Casting Galileo's story as a contest between science and religion is an oversimplification, writes Jeffrey Foss. Galileo was heir to a long scientific tradition with deep medieval Christian roots.

== See also ==
- Conflict thesis
- Continuity thesis
- Deep ecology
- Demarcation problem
- Faith and rationality
- History of science
- Intelligent design
- Issues in Science and Religion
- List of scholars on the relationship between religion and science
- Natural theology
- Philosophy of science
- Politicization of science
- Religious skepticism
- Relationship between religion and science
- Psychology of religion
- Scientific method and religion
- Theistic evolution

By tradition:

- List of Christians in science and technology
- List of Christian Nobel laureates
- Catholic Church and science and Catholic Church and evolution
- List of Catholic clergy scientists
- List of lay Catholic scientists
- List of Catholic priests and religious awarded the Nobel Prize
- Merton thesis
- Parson-naturalist
- Quakers in science

In the US:

- American Scientific Affiliation
- Center for Theology and the Natural Sciences
- Creation–evolution controversy
- John Templeton Foundation

== Notes ==
=== Works cited ===
- Numbers, Ronald L. (2006). The Creationists: From Scientific Creationism to Intelligent Design. Harvard University Press. ISBN 978-0-674-02339-0.
- Shalev, Baruch A. (2003). 100 Years of Nobel Prizes. Atlantic Publishers & Dist. ISBN 978-81-269-0278-1.
- Thomas, Anne (24 April 2000), This I Know Experimentally, Spring 2000 Monday Night Lecture Series: Science and Religion, Pendle Hill (published 6 October 2003), archived from the original on 1 May 2006
