= Amos Funkenstein =

American Jewish historian (1937–1995)

- Born: 9 March 1937; Jaffa
- Died: 11 November 1995
- Occupations: Philosopher, university teacher
- Awards: Guggenheim Fellowship; Israel Prize (1995)

Amos Funkenstein (1937–1995) was an American-Jewish historian of Jewish history. Funkenstein's work encompassed several disciplines.

== Biography ==
Funkenstein was born into an Orthodox family in Mandatory Palestine and was childhood friends with Adin Steinsaltz. Funkenstein declared his atheism as a child in religious school in Jerusalem. Funkenstein, like Baruch Spinoza, was considered heretical.

In 1967, he started his career as a history professor at UCLA, where David Biale was among his graduate students and teaching assistants, and later taught at Tel Aviv University, Stanford and UC Berkeley. Biale recalled that Funkenstein favored originality, preferring to be "bold and wrong" than "boring and right."

Funkenstein wrote seven books in English, German, Hebrew and French, and over 50 articles, and was said to have a photographic memory, reciting lengthy passages memorized in Greek and Latin from books he had long ago read. He died of lung cancer in November 1995 at age 58, survived by his wife Esti and two children, Jakob and Daniela.

== Research ==
Funkenstein's research interests were diverse: he studied historiography and historical consciousness among Jews and Christians in the Middle Ages and the early modern period, the Christian polemic against Judaism, Biblical exegesis in the Middle Ages, the connection between theology and science, and the history of scientific thought from the Hellenistic period to the present day.

=== Theology and the Scientific Imagination from the Middle Ages to the Seventeenth Century ===
In this seminal work, Funkenstein traces the evolution of theological and philosophical discourse from the Middle Ages, arguing that it served as the essential intellectual precursor from which modern science, historical consciousness, and modern historical writing emerged in the 17th century.

Funkenstein provides a systematic analysis of pre-modern thought to examine the full intellectual scope of the 17th century, clarifying both the nature of the shift towards modernity and the crucial theological background of early scientific activity. His analysis offers a unique contribution to scholarship by rejecting the positivist historical dichotomy that conventionally separates rational science from dogmatic religion. Funkenstein dismantles the traditional opposition between religion and science, instead revealing the scientific claims inherent in theological discussions and the theological components embedded within modern scientific thought.

=== Perceptions of Jewish History ===
In this book, Funkenstein argues in this collection that Jewish identity is fundamentally rooted in a profound historical consciousness which deepened during the Middle Ages, particularly in response to polemics from Christianity and Islam. He contends that while Jews held a belief in a divine guarantor for their future, they were continually compelled to justify their past.

He posits that, until the 19th century, Jewish historical thought, aimed at validating existence, focused on elements that differentiated them from the surrounding nations. This dynamic reversed with Emancipation in the 19th century, leading Jews to seek common ground and shared history with the broader world.

The book reflects Funkenstein's key theoretical stance in his dispute with historian Yosef Hayim Yerushalmi regarding the relationship between history and memory in Jewish tradition. Funkenstein introduced the concept of "historical consciousness" as a nuanced middle ground between formal, professional historiography and collective memory, arguing for its validity across cultures and its particular relevance to understanding pre-modern historical concepts.

== Funkenstein Prize ==
In 1999, the Amos Funkenstein Prize was established through a joint initiative of the Cohn Institute for the History and Philosophy of Science and Ideas (of which Funkenstein was a co-founder) and the School of History at Tel Aviv University. This annual prize is awarded to outstanding Ph.D. or Master's graduates whose recently completed dissertations demonstrate daring and high originality in any of Funkenstein's diverse fields of interest.

Recipients of the Amos Funkenstein Prize
Year	Degree	Student Name	Title	Advisor(s)
2025	PhD Thesis	Maya Roman	The Normative Mind	Prof. Menachem Fisch
2025	MA Thesis	Eyal Yair Hacohen	Hegelian Critique and the Challenge of the Climate Crisis	Dr. Naveh Frumer
2024	PhD Thesis	Aviram Sariel	Controversies and Enlightenment: Gnostic Elements in Leibniz's Philosophy	The late Prof. Marcelo Dascal, Prof. Yosef Schartz
2023	PhD Thesis	Kati Kish Bar-On	Living with contradiction: Testing models of framework transitions through Brouwer's intuitionism	Prof. Menachem Fisch, Prof. Leo Corry
2022	PhD Thesis	Mickey Peled	Conjecturing Beliefs: Abductive Inference in Monetary Policymaking	Prof. Moshe Zuckerman, Prof. Itzhak Gilboa
2021	MA Thesis	Tuval Klein	Marie Curie: Biographical Constructions of a Scientific Heroine	Prof. Jose Bruner, Dr. Snait Gissis
2020	MA Thesis	Noga Shlomi	The Tacuinum Sanitatis. Practices of Collecting and Presenting Medical Knowledge Between the Middle Ages and the Renaissance	Prof. Yossi Schwartz, Prof. Matteo Valleriani
2019	MA Thesis	Ahuviya Goren	Rabbi Moshe Hefetz and his Book Melekhet Makhshevet: Science, Theology and Skepticism in early modern Venice	Prof. Yossi Schwartz
2018	MA Thesis	Zvi Hasnes Beninson	Statistical Considerations for Rethinking the Historiography of Ancient Greek Astronomy	Dr. Ido Yavetz, Prof. Matteo Valleriani
2017	MA Thesis	Ayal Hayut-man	Perceptions of the Torah in Medieval Jewish Hermeneutics – a Comparative Study of Ibn Ezra, Maimonides and Nahmanides	Prof. Yossi Schwartz
2016	PhD Thesis	Gal Hertz	Karl Kraus: Language, Society and the Rise of the Media-Technology	Prof. Adi Ophir, Prof. Daniel Dor
2015	PhD Thesis	Chaim Shulman	A Tale of Three Thirsty Cities: The Innovative Water Supply Systems of Toledo, London and Paris in the Second Half of the Sixteenth Century	Prof. Benjamin Arbel
2015	MA Thesis	Dikla Bytner	A few Thoughts concerning Leibniz's Odd Though	Prof. Rivka Feldhay
2014	PhD Thesis	Amir Teicher	’Social-Mendelism’: The Effects of Mendel's Theorems on the Formation of Human Sciences in Germany, 1900-1936	Prof. Eva Jablonka, Prof. Shulamit Volkov
2013	MA Thesis	Yigal Liverant	The Order of the Symbol: Joseph De Maistre's Considerations of the Symbolic Representation as Major Element in the Political Life	Prof. Moshe Zuckerman
2011	PhD Thesis	Leon Jacobowitz Efron	Dante Alighieri the Secular Theologian: Reception, Authority and Subversion 1320-1483	Prof. Yossef Schwartz, Prof. Peter S. Hawkins
2010	PhD Thesis	Michael Elazar	Honorè Fabri and the history of Mechanics	Prof. Rivka Feldhay
2009	PhD Thesis	Ariel Furstenberg	The Languages of Talmudic Discourse: A Philosophical Study of the Evolution of Amoraic Halakha	Prof. Menachem Fisch
2008	PhD Thesis	Roy Wagner	A Post-Structural Reading of a Logico-Mathematical Text	Prof. Adi Ophir, Prof. Anat Biletzki
2007	MA Thesis	Eran Tal	On Scientist's Use of Tools: The Limits of the Sociological Approach	Prof. Gideon Freudenthal
2006	MA Thesis	Ayelet Ibn Ezra	Reflexive Thinking in the Divine Realm and in Human Thinking in the Writings of Alberus Magnus	Prof. Yosef Schwartz
2005	MA Thesis	Gali Schapira	The Principle of Spatial Continuity between "Imaginary" and "Real" Territories in the Geographical Conception of the Earth's Confines in Homerus' and Hesiod's Poetry	Prof. Irad Malkin
2004	MA Thesis	Naama Akaviah	The Case Of Ellen West: Between Psychotherapy & Existentialism	Prof. Jose Brunner
2003	PhD Dissertation	Hagar Smilanski	Dreams, Medicine And Therapy In The Middle Ages – The Theory Of Dreams In Islamic And Jewish Culture	Prof. Ron Barkai
2002	MA Thesis	Michal Givoni	Jeremy Bentham's Panopticon: A Moral Domain	Prof. Adi Ophir
2001	MA Thesis	Galia Uri-Asseo	King Of Desires: Blaise Pascal On Nature, Illusion And Domination	Prof. Yossi Mali
2000	MA Thesis	Oded Schechter	The Law Of Determinability: Maimon After Leibniz and Kant and Before Hegel	Prof. Gideon Freudenthal
1999	PhD Dissertation	Shlomo Sela	Astrology and Biblical Exegesis in Abraham Ibn Ezra's Thought	Prof. Ron Barkai

== Publications ==
- Funkenstein, Amos (1965). Heilsplan und natürliche Entwicklung: Formen der Gegenwartsbestimmung im Geschichtsdenken des hohen Mittelalters (in German). Nymphenburger Verlanshandlung.
- Funkenstein, Amos (1989). Theology and the scientific imagination from the middle ages to the 17th century. Princeton, NJ: Princeton University Press. ISBN 978-0-691-02425-7.
- Funkenstein, Amos (1990). Intellectuals and Jews. Temple Emanu-El.
- Funkenstein, Amos; פונקנשטיין, עמוס (1991). תדמית ותודעה היסטורית ביהדות ובסביבתה התרבותית (in Hebrew). עם עובד. ISBN 978-965-13-0732-4.
- Funkenstein, Amos (1993). Perceptions of Jewish history. A centennial book. Berkeley, Calif.: Univ. of California Press. ISBN 978-0-520-07702-7.
- Funkenstein, Amos (1995). Jüdische Geschichte und ihre Deutungen (in German). Jüdischer Verlag. ISBN 978-3-633-54099-0.
- Steinsaltz, Adin; Функенштейн, Амос (1997). Социология невежества (in Russian). Институт изучения иудаизма в СНГ. ISBN 978-5-86676-006-0.
- Funkenstein, Amos (1997). Maimonides: nature, history, and messianic beliefs. Tel-Aviv: MOD Books. ISBN 978-965-05-0909-5.
- Funkenstein, Amos (2018-11-13). Theology and the Scientific Imagination: From the Middle Ages to the Seventeenth Century, Second Edition. Princeton University Press. ISBN 978-0-691-18426-5.
