= Michael Foster (philosopher) =

British philosopher, born 1903

Michael Beresford Foster (1903–1959) was a tutor in philosophy of Oxford University's Christ Church. For a period up until his death he was the chairman of the British Student Christian Movement. He was one of A. J. Ayer's tutors at Oxford, but their relationship is remembered more as a source of strained feelings than of scholarly fellowship. His disparate works on political science and various doctrines of Christianity (especially creationism) have influenced philosophers such as George Grant, who had, when writing his doctoral thesis, in fact visited with Foster in England.

== Education ==
His elementary schooling took place at a Merchant Taylors' School. He then proceeded to St John's College, Oxford, gaining a lifetime friend and colleague John Mabbott. In 1927–1928 he studied under Richard Kroner in Dresden, Germany.

== Foster's creation-science thesis ==
Foster is remembered for his thesis that the idea of Christian creation and its view of nature—especially in contrast to various Greek views of nature—deeply influenced the development of early modern science. Mention of Foster's thesis can be found in the work of historian and theologian Alister E. McGrath, for example. Foster's thesis (published 1934–1936) differs greatly from the Merton thesis (published 1938) and other harmony-type historical investigations (e.g., that of Reijer Hooykaas) since rather than relying on historical contingencies to establish a relation, he abstractly asserts using analytical philosophy a logical necessity between an orthodox Christian view of creation and a modern view of science, i.e., Christianity is a necessary and sufficient condition for the development of modern science. Although when citing this thesis many scholars refer only to the three 1934–1936 Mind journal articles, an until-recently-sometimes-hard-to-locate conference paper given in Italy in 1933 by Foster actually forms a "natural unit" with the three Mind articles. This first paper—"The Opposition Between Hegel and the Philosophy of Empiricism"—argued that there is "one Christian truth incorporated in modern Empiricism which Hegel's Philosophy ignores. ... This truth is the truth contained in the Christian doctrine of Creation." Foster's creation-science thesis is actually a modern form of what historians and philosophers sometimes more technically label voluntarism, which is a worldview that tends to be held by empiricists: an historically opposing worldview was that of the "intellectualists" who tend to be rationalists.

== Mystery and philosophy ==
In his book Mystery and Philosophy (SCM Press, 1957), Foster seeks to explore the existence of mystery in various secular and religious disciplines to discover whether it serves a legitimate function in theology and philosophy when possibly applied to scientific and political realities. Foster asserts that realities exist (i.e., those found in revelation and appealed to in prayer) that are mysterious and will remain so; Foster's view of mystery like that of Gabriel Marcel's is therefore quite different from his view of unsolved puzzles and problems, which he, here following Marcel, holds only temporarily appear mysterious. This idea of irresolvable mystery is similar to ones also found in the works of Eric L. Mascall and Norman Geisler. Foster concludes this book by stating "[Faith] is directed upon mystery, as revelation springs from mystery, and as prayer seems properly to be directed upon mysterious objects." Mention of Foster's view of mystery can be found in the work of the philosopher Ann Hartle, for example.

== Works ==
Works of his that remain important to the history of science include "The Christian Doctrine of Creation and the Rise of Modern Natural Science" (Mind, Volume 43, 1934, p. 446–468), "Christian Theology and Modern Science of Nature." (Mind, Volume 44, 1935, pp. 439–466 (part I) and Volume 45, 1936, pp. 1–27 (part II)).

- Mystery and Philosophy, Michael Beresford Foster, SCM Press, 1957, pages 96
- "Man's Idea of Nature", The Christian Scholar, Volume 41, Number 3, September 1958, pages 361–366
- The Political Philosophies of Plato and Hegel, Michael Beresford Foster, Major Bronson Foster, Russell & Russell, 1965 (originally published 1935), 207 pages
- Michael B. Foster. Ed. Edward McChesney Sait. Masters of Political Thought (Volume 1): Plato to Machiavelli. Houghton Mifflin, 1941. (a 1974 edition has ISBN 0-518-10154-1)
- "The Christian Doctrine of Creation and the Rise of Modern Natural Science" in "Daniel O'connor and Francis Christopher Oakley (eds.), Creation: The Impact of an Idea, 1969, Charles Scribner's Sons set of 36 contemporary book citations

== See also ==
- Eugene Marion Klaaren
- Christopher B. Kaiser
