= Noah Efron =

American-Israeli writer (born 1959)

- נח עפרון
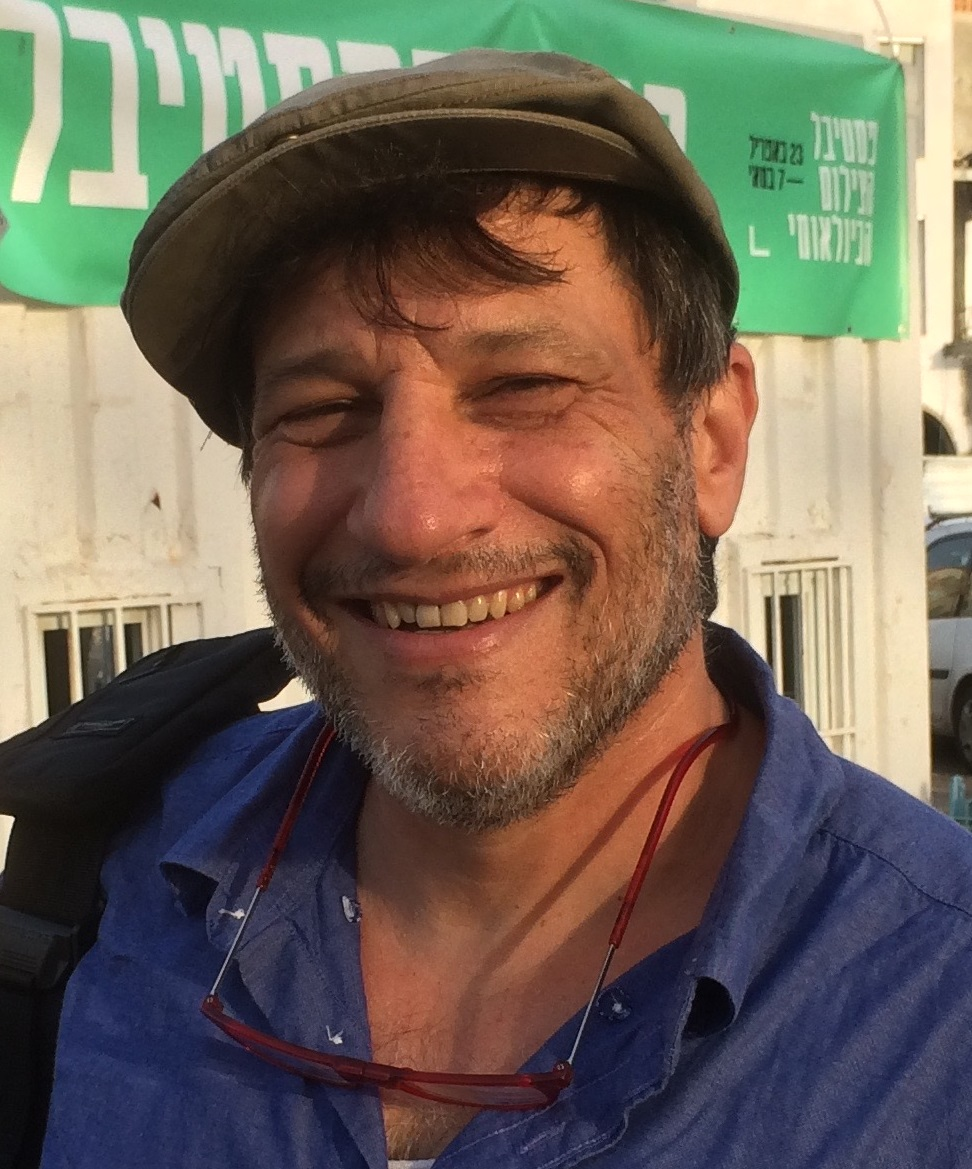
- Efron in May 2016
- Born: Noah Jonathan Efron; December 16, 1959 (age 66); Plainfield, New Jersey, U.S.
- Education: Swarthmore College (BA); Tel Aviv University (PhD)
- Occupations: Professor at Bar-Ilan University, Writer, Podcast Host

Noah Jonathan Efron (Hebrew: נח עפרון; born December 16, 1959) is a professor at Bar-Ilan University, where he was founding chair of the interdisciplinary program on Science, Technology, and Society.

He has served as the President of the Israeli Society for History & Philosophy of Science, on the board of directors and Scientific Committee of the Eretz Israel Museum, and on the executive committee of the International Society for Science and Religion. He is a standing member of Israel's National Committee for Transgenic Plants, and participated in Knesset deliberations on human cloning legislation.

Efron has been a member of the Institute for Advanced Study in Princeton, a fellow of the Dibner Institute for History of Science and Technology at MIT, a fellow at Harvard University, and a visiting professor at Columbia University and the University of Pennsylvania.

He is a former member of the Tel Aviv City Council, a published author, and the host of a popular podcast.

== Biography ==
Efron was born on December 16, 1959, to Herman and Rosalyn Efron in Plainfield, New Jersey. He grew up in a religious Jewish home, attending a yeshiva and adhering to the rules of kashrut and Shabbat. In his youth he was a member of the Young Judaea youth movement and the bass player for the now defunct band Liquid Plumr.

After graduating from Swarthmore College in 1982, Efron was awarded a fellowship by the Watson Foundation, which funded a year of independent research of his choosing. He spent the following year traveling throughout Northern Africa, researching its Jewish communities.

In 1983, Efron moved to Israel with his girlfriend Susan Warchaizer (whom he married in 1986), as part of a gar'in aliyah. They lived on Kibbutz Ketura in southern Israel for the next four years. While at Ketura, Efron served in the Israel Defense Forces as an infantry soldier and squad commander in the Nahal Division. He moved to Tel Aviv to attend graduate school in 1987.

In 1999, after his doctoral studies, Efron began working at Bar-Ilan University in a graduate program for interdisciplinary studies as a lecturer on the history and philosophy of science. In 2000, he founded the interdisciplinary program on Science, Technology, and Society, which he chaired until 2010, and where he continues to teach. He was tenured in 2005.

== Education ==
Efron received his B.A. from Swarthmore College, from which he graduated with high honors (in psychology, philosophy, and political science) in 1982. In 1996, he received his Ph.D. at Tel Aviv University's Institute for the History & Philosophy of Science & Ideas. He was a postdoctoral fellow at Harvard University's Department of History of Science from 1995 to 1997, and a postdoctoral fellow at the Massachusetts Institute of Technology's Dibner Institute for the History of Science and Technology from 1997 to 1999.

== Writings ==
=== Major publications ===
Real Jews: Secular Versus Ultra-Orthodox: The Struggle for Jewish Identity in Israel, published by Basic Books in 2003, discusses and provides a detailed historical analysis of the divide and the hostilities between secular Jews and the ultra-orthodox in the Jewish state.

Judaism and Science: A Historical Introduction, published by the Greenwood Publishing Group in 2007, is a historical analysis and explanation of the relationship between the Jewish people and science.

A Chosen Calling: Jews in Science in the Twentieth Century, published by JHU Press in 2014, theorizes about the reason for Jews’ allegedly inherent affinity and aptitude for the sciences in the 20th century.

=== Articles ===
Efron's essays have appeared in Foreign Policy, The Washington Post, Hadassah Magazine, Commentary, Moment, Midstream, the Boston Review, the Jewish Review of Books, Haaretz, Yedioth Aharonoth, Maariv, Le Monde, Tikkun, Jewish Action, the Jewish World Review, The Jerusalem Report, Zocalo Public Square, The Times of Israel, and HuffPost. In 2006, he was awarded the Simon Rockower Award for Best Essay or Commentary of 2006 on a Jewish theme. Following is a partial list of Efron's published articles:

- "The End of Pre-Eminence: Jews & the Nobel Prize in the 20th Century", Jüdischer Almanach des Leo Baeck Institute, Vol. 23, 2015.
- "Jews and the Study of Nature", in James Haag, Gregory R. Peterson, and Michael Spezio, The Routledge Companion to Religion and Science, Routledge, 2012, pp. 79–90.
- "Zionism and the Eros of Science and Technology", Zygon: Journal of Religion and Science, 46, 2, June 2011, pp. 413–428.
- "Nature & Early Judaism", in John Hedley Brooke and Ronald Numbers (eds.), Science and Religion Around the World, Oxford University Press, 2011, pp. 20–43.
- "The Wisdom of Everyman": The Natural, the Sacred and the Human in Modern Jewish Thought", in Paul J. Kirbas (ed.), This Sacred Earth: Scientific and Religious Perspectives on Nature and Humanity's Place Within It, Wyndham Hall Press, 2011, pp. 189–202.
- "Sciences and Religions: What it Means to take Historical Perspectives Seriously", in Thomas Dixon, Geoffrey Cantor and Stephen Pumfrey (eds.), Science and Religion: New Historical Perspectives, Cambridge University Press, 2010, pp. 247–262.
- "Without a Horse: On Being Human in an Age of Biotechnology", in Nancey Murphy and Christopher Knight, Human Identity at the Intersection of Science, Theology and Religion, London, Ashgate, 2010.
- "On the Christian Origins of Modern Science", in Ron Numbers (ed), Galileo Went to Jail, and Other Myths of Science and Religion, Harvard University Press, 2010.
- "Jews and Science before Modern Times", in Ron Numbers & John Brooke (eds.), Religion and Science in a Global Perspective, Oxford University Press, 2010.
- "Science, Technology, & Culture", Blackwell Encyclopedia of Sociology, 2008.
- "American Jews & Intelligent Design", Reilly Center Reports of the University of Notre Dame, 2008.
- "Jewish Tradition and the Challenge of Darwinism: Review", Isis, 2008, 99: 416–418
- "Playing God: On the Philosophical Implications of a Metaphor about Science", in Charles L. Harper (ed.), Spiritual Information: Perspectives on Science and Religion, Templeton Press, 2005.
- "Nature, Human Nature, & Jewish Nature In Early Modern Europe", Science in Context, 15:1, 2002.
- "Our Forefathers Did Not Tell Us: Jews & Natural Philosophy in Rudolfine Prague", Endeavor, 26:1, 2002.
- "Astronomic Exegesis: Interpretation of the Heavens by Early Modern Jews", Osiris, 16, pp. 72–87, 2001 (with Menachem Fisch).
- "Knowledge of Newly Discovered Lands among Jewish Communities of Europe (From 1492 to the Thirty-Years War)," in Bernardini, Paolo & Norman Fiering (eds.), The Jews and the Expansion of Europe to the West, Berghahn Press, 2001.
- "Common Goods: Jewish and Christian Householder Cultures in Early Modern Prague," Sally McKee (ed.) Crossing Boundaries: Issues of Cultural Identity in the Middle Ages and the Renaissance, Brepols, pp. 233–256, 2000.
- "Irenism and Natural Philosophy in Rudolfine Prague," Science in Context, 10:4, 1997, pp. 627–649.
- "Jewish Thought and Scientific Discovery in Early Modern Europe," Journal for the History of Ideas, Fall, 1997, pp. 719–732.
- "Jews and Liberal Arts in Early Modern Prague," Acta Historiae Rerum Naturalium Necnon Technicarum, Vol. I (New Series), 1997, pp. 24–35.
- "Diagnosis, Dogmatism, and Rationality," Journal of Mental Health Counseling, 19:1, January, 1997, pp. 40–56. (with Jonathan Rabinowitz)
- "Science Naturalized, Science Denatured: An Evaluation of Ronald Giere’s Cognitivist Approach to Explaining Science," History and Philosophy of the Life Sciences, 13, 1991, pp. 187–221. (with Menachem Fisch)
- "Irrationality in Data Collection and Analysis as an Impediment to Clinical Diagnosis and Evaluation" (In Hebrew), Psychologia, 3, 1992. (with Jonathan Rabinowitz)
- "David ben Solomon Gans," The Encyclopedia of Jews in Eastern Europe, YIVO Institute, New York.
- "Maharal of Prague," The Encyclopedia of the Renaissance, Charles Scribner's Sons, New York.
- "Moses Isserles," The Encyclopedia of the Renaissance, Charles Scribner's Sons, New York.
- "David Gans," The Encyclopedia of the Renaissance, Charles Scribner's Sons, New York.

== Political career ==
Efron was a member of the Tel Aviv City Council, as a member of the Ir LeKulanu (Hebrew- עיר לכולנו) party, from 2008 to 2011, when he was replaced by Sharon Luzon in accordance with the party's rotation agreement.

His achievements as a member of the city council include:

- A plan for the improvement of public transportation, Mahir BaEir (Hebrew – מהיר בעיר). Among the changes in the plan are more frequent bus departures and dedicated bus lanes.
- Demanding increased transparency in city government issues. Efron led a campaign to ensure that citizens can voice their ideas and grievances before the city council. He also actively advocated for the publishing and digital upload of the city budget plan before and after its approval.
- An organizing role in the Open Night Run (Hebrew מירוץ לילה פתוח), an alternative to the runs heavily sponsored by for-profit organizations and used by them for advertising purposes.

Efron was also a founding member of the Green Movement party (Hebrew התנועה הירוקה).

== "The Promised Podcast" ==
In 2011, Efron created and began hosting "The Promised Podcast", produced by the Tel Aviv-based podcast network TLV1. "The Promised Podcast" discusses topical issues in Israeli politics from a self-proclaimed leftist perspective. Moment magazine named it one of the Top Ten Jewish Podcasts and the Jewish Ledger named it one of the "7 Top Jewish podcasts".
