= Amir Mizroch =

Israeli journalist

Amir Mizroch (Hebrew: אמיר מיזרוח; born December 6, 1975) is an Israeli journalist and communications advisor. He previously worked for Israeli tech NGO Start-Up Nation Central as Director of Communications. He is a consultant to strategic communications company Milltown Partners. Previously he was the technology editor for Europe, The Middle East and Africa at The Wall Street Journal, based in London. Before that he presented a current affairs radio show on TLV1. He was founding editor of the English Edition of Israel Hayom,. Amir spent 8 years at The Jerusalem Post, serving as managing editor – Internet, news editor, features editor, and eventually as executive editor.

== Early life and education ==
Mizroch was born in Israel and raised in South Africa, returning to Israel in 2000 after university. He has a Bachelor of Journalism and Media Studies from Rhodes University in Grahamstown, South Africa.

== Career ==
Mizroch first worked as an investigative news producer at the Mail & Guardian television in Johannesburg, South Africa. In 2002 he joined The Jerusalem Post, serving as managing editor of the paper's website jpost.com. He was news editor from 2004 to April 2010. On April 21 he was promoted to executive editor and features editor. He resigned in February 2011. He joined Israel Hayom in April 2011, and left in November 2013.

During that time he contributed to the Danger Room blog of Wired Magazine.

On 16 January 2014, it was announced that he will be joining The Wall Street Journal as technology editor for Europe, the Middle East and Africa.

== Honors ==
- Certificate of Merit award for Journalism from the B'nai B'rith World Center for American Jewish Communities blog.
- Bertelsmann Stiftung - German Israeli Young Leaders Exchange program

== Articles ==
- The weather is with Hamas The Jerusalem Post Dec 31, 2008
- Analysis: An unforgivable act in an unforgiving situation The Jerusalem Post Dec 18, 2008
- Jews Lost and Found in India
- "How Free Explains Israel's Flotilla FAIL". Wired. June 2, 2010.
