= Ariella Azoulay =

Palestinian Jew of African origins artist and professor

Ariella Aïsha Azoulay
- אריאלה אזולאי
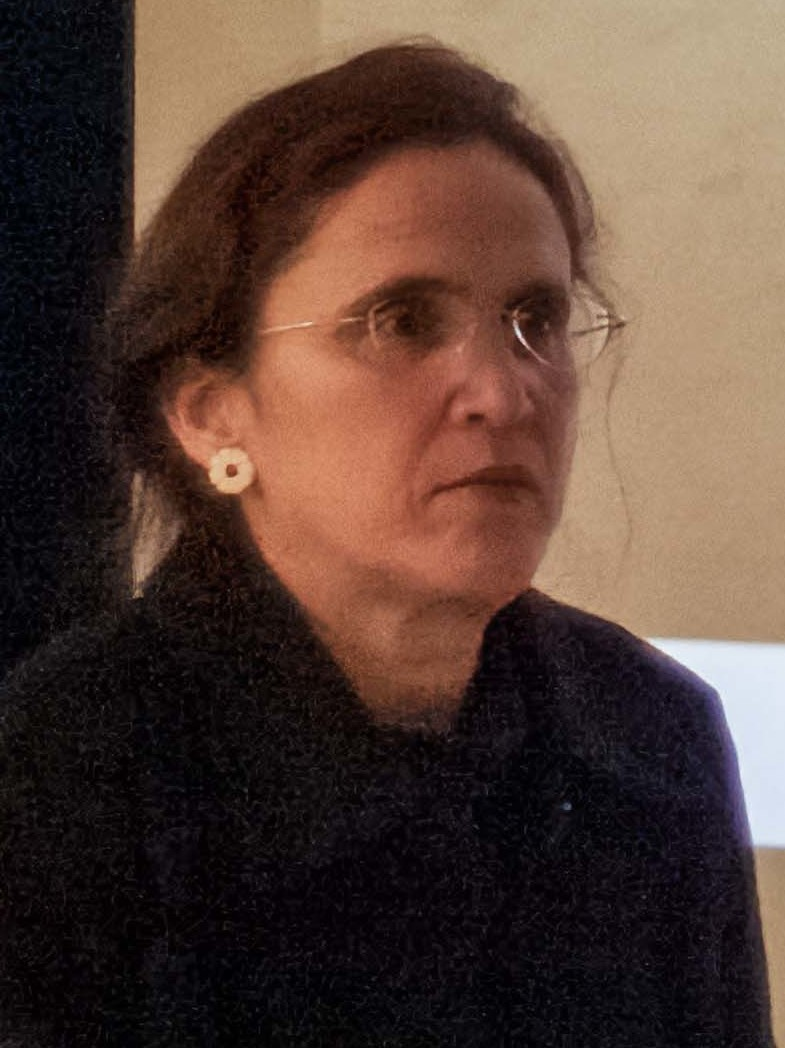
- Born: February 21, 1962 (age 64); Tel Aviv, Israel
- Partner: Adi Ophir

Academic background
- Education: Université Paris VIII École des hautes études en sciences sociales Tel Aviv University

Academic work
- Institutions: University of Connecticut Durham University Brown University

Ariella Aïsha Azoulay (Hebrew: אריאלה עיישה אזולאי; born February 21, 1962) is an author, art curator, filmmaker, and theorist of photography and visual culture. Born in Tel Aviv, Israel, she identifies as an "Arab Jew and a Palestinian Jew of African origins", rejecting "Israeli" as part of her identity. (Note: Azoulay rejects Israeli as part of her identity: In my book [Potential History: Unlearning Imperialism], I describe my rejection of the adjective “Israeli” as part of my identity, acknowledging that the name of “Israel” legitimates a campaign of violence that omits the destruction of Palestine. Writing this book is part of righting this wrong. I refuse to be enlisted in ontological violence. I insist on actualizing other lineages that the state renders unimaginable, such as me being an Arab Jew and a Palestinian Jew of African origins.) She is a professor of Modern Culture and Media and the Department of Comparative Literature at Brown University and an independent curator of Archives and Exhibitions.

== Early life ==
Azoulay has degrees from Université Paris VIII, Ecole des Hautes Etudes en Sciences Sociales and Tel Aviv University.

Azoulay is of Algerian descent.

== Academic career ==
In 1999 she began teaching at Bar-Ilan University. In 2010 Azoulay was denied tenure at Bar-Ilan, a move regarded by some colleagues and commentators as politically motivated. In 2010 she was the Gladstein Visiting professor at the Human Rights Center of the University of Connecticut. In 2011 she was Leverhulme Research Professor at Durham University, and she is currently professor of Comparative Literature and Modern Culture and Media at Brown University's Watson Institute for International Studies.

Her partner, with whom she has also co-authored written work, is the philosopher Adi Ophir.

== Theory ==
Throughout her career, Azoulay developed concepts and approaches around the reversal of imperial violence. The theoretical framework she proposed have far-reaching implications in a number of knowledge fields, such as political theory, archival science, visual and photography studies.

=== Writings ===
==== Potential History ====
In her book Potential History: Unlearning Imperialism (Verso, 2019), Azoulay studies historical objects (from photographs to documents) belonging to archives and museum collections. In her opinion, the museums must be de-imperialized, as well as the discipline of history itself. She suggests a methodology and an ethics for engaging with historical and archival materials that allows the historical present discussion to come forward; refusing to relegate these materials to a foreclosed past. In her words:

"Our approach to the archive cannot be guided by the imperial desire to unearth unknown ‘hidden’ moments (...) It should rather be driven by the conviction that other political species were and continue to be real options in our present."

— Ariella Aïsha Azoulay, Potential History, 2019

Azoulay invites both the scholar and the public to see the imminent potential in such objects for fostering nonimperial forms of identification and meaning. In her perspective, the archive is not only a repository of documents but a regime of procedures interwoven with imperialist dogmas. Therefore, the Potential History is an ongoing process of revising these dogmas, through ontology and epistemology. In other words, this kind of history writing should question both the nature of things and the way one understand them. This discussion relates to decolonial theories.

Furthermore, Azoulay notes how the decolonization of museums is not possible without the decolonization of the world itself.

==== The Civil Contract of Photography ====
Azoulay's concept of the 'civil contract of photography' addresses the relationship between the photographer and the photographed. Exploring ideas of ownership, plurality and power the text considers photography's roles in relation to politics and government, challenging the assumed truth of photography.

== Works ==
=== Writing ===
The following is available in English translation:

- Death's Showcase: the power of image in contemporary democracy, 2001
- The Civil Contract of Photography, Zone Books, 2008
- From Palestine to Israel: A Photographic Record of Destruction and State Formation, 1947–1950, Pluto Press, 2011
- Civil Imagination: A Political Ontology of Photography, 2011
- (With Adi Ophir) This Regime Which Is Not One: Occupation and Democracy between the Sea and The River (1967 – ), Stanford University Press, 2011
- (With Adi Ophir) The One-State Condition: Occupation and Democracy in Israel/Palestine, Stanford University Press
- Different ways not to say deportation, Fillip Editions/Artspeak, 2013
- Potential History: Unlearning Imperialism, Verso Books, November 2019
- The Jewelers of the Ummah: A Potential History of the Jewish Muslim World, Verso Books, September 2024

=== Films ===
- The Food Chain (2010)
- The Angel of History
- Civil Alliance (2012)
- Un-Documented: Unlearning Imperial Plunder (2019)

=== Exhibitions ===
- Everything Could Be Seen (Al Fahem Gallery, Umm Al Fahem, 2004)
- Untaken Photographs (Ljubljana Museum of Modern Art, Galeria Moderna, Zochrot, 2010).
- Potential History (Center For Digital Art, Holon, 2012)
- The Body Politic I (Reina Sofia, Madrid, 2014)
- Horizontal Photography, of Aim Deüelle Lüski (MOBY Museum, 2014)
- Errata (Tapiès Foundation, 2019; HKW, Berlin, 2020)
- Enough! The Natural Violence of New World Order (F/Stop photography festival, Leipzig, 2016)
- Act of State 1967–2007, (Exhibition Tour, 2007–present)
- The Natural History of Rape (Berlin Biennale, KW Institute for Contemporary Art, 2022)

== Prizes ==
- 2024 – The Center for Photography at Woodstock (CPW) Vision Awards for the best photobook of the year Collaboration – Potential History of Photography (co-authored with Wendy Ewald, Susan Meiselas, Leigh Raiford & Laura Wexler), Thames & Hudson.
- 2023 – Royal Photographic Society Award.
- 2023 – Infinity Award by the International Center of Photography (ICP) for excellence in critical writing, theory and research on photography.
- 2022 – Berlin Prize, American Academy of Berlin.
- 2010 – Award for innovative curatorial approaches and theoretical research in contemporary visual arts from Igor Zabel Competition (for the exhibition Untaken Photographs, Museum of Modern Art, Ljubljana)
- 2002 – Infinity Award by the International Center of Photography (ICP) for the best book written on photography for the year 2001 (Death’s Showcase, MIT Press).

== Bibliography ==
- Gormley, Anna; Allan, Stuart (2019). "Re-imagining Human Rights Photography: Ariella Azoulay's Intervention". Reporting Human Rights, Conflicts, and Peacebuilding. Springer International Publishing. doi:10.1007/978-3-030-10719-2_13. ISBN 978-3-030-10718-5.
- Andrew Fisher, Daniel Rubenstein, "Out of photography … Interview with Ariella Azoulay", Philosophy of Photography, volume 2, numéro 1, pages 3–20, 2011-09, https://research.gold.ac.uk/id/eprint/4331/
