= Jonathan Wright (historian) =

British historian and author (born 1969)

Jonathan Wright (born 1969) is a British historian and author.

His books include The Jesuits: Missions, Myths and Histories (HarperCollins, 2004), published in the United States as God's Soldiers (Doubleday, 2004), and The Ambassadors: From Ancient Greece to the Nation State (HarperCollins, 2006), and Heretics: The Creation of Christianity from the Gnostics to the Modern Church (Houghton Mifflin Harcourt, 2011) (on heresy).

Wright was educated at the Universities of St Andrews and Oxford where he was awarded a doctorate in 1999. Wright reviews for numerous British and American newspapers, magazines and academic journals.
