= John Dillenberger =

American academic

John Dillenberger (1918–2008) was professor of historical theology at the Graduate Theological Union in Berkeley, California. He was instrumental in forming the Graduate Theological Union which he headed during its first decade, first as dean from 1964 to 1969 and then, from 1967 to 1972, as its first president, a post to which he returned in 1999–2000. He also served as president of Hartford Seminary, dean of the faculty at San Francisco Theological Seminary, chair of the program in history and philosophy at Harvard University, and as president of the American Academy of Religion.

As a historian of science, Dillenberger specialized in the relations of religion and science. For three decades, his book Protestant Thought and Natural Science (Doubleday, 1960) was a leading introductory survey. As an introductory survey, this book has been superseded by Christopher B. Kaiser's Creation and the History of Science (Eerdmans, 1991).
