= Adi Ophir =

Israeli philosopher

- עדי אופיר
- Born: September 22, 1951 (age 75)
- Partner: Ariella Azoulay

Academic background
- Education: Hebrew University of Jerusalem; Boston University

Adi Ophir (Hebrew: עדי אופיר; born September 22, 1951) is an Israeli philosopher.

== Early life ==
Adi Ophir was born on September 22, 1951. He received his BA and MA from the Hebrew University of Jerusalem and his PhD from Boston University.

== Career ==
Ophir teaches philosophy at the Cohn Institute for the History and Philosophy of Science and Ideas at Tel Aviv University. He is also a fellow at the Van Leer Jerusalem Institute where he directs an interdisciplinary research project on "Humanitarian Action in Catastrophes: The Shaping of Contemporary Political Imagination and Moral Sensibilities."

== Works ==
- Plato's Invisible Cities: Discourse and Power in the "Republic" (1990). Routledge. ISBN 0-415-03596-1
- "The Identity of the Victims and the Victims of Identity: A Critique of Zionist Ideology for a Post-Zionist Age." (2000) In Laurence Jay Silberstein (ed.), Mapping Jewish Identities (pp. 174–200). NYU Press. ISBN 0-8147-9769-5.
- The Order of Evils: Toward an Ontology of Morals (2005). MIT Press. Translated by Rela Mezali and Havi Carel. ISBN 1-890951-51-X
- (ed. with Michal Givoni and Sari Hanafi) The power of inclusive exclusion: anatomy of Israeli rule in the occupied Palestinian territories, Zone Books, 2009. ISBN 978-1-890951-92-4
- (with Ariella Azoulay) The One-State Condition. Stanford University Press, 2012.
- אלימות אלוהית : שני חיבורים על אלוהים ואסון [Divine Violence: Two Essays on God and Disaster]. The Van Leer Institute, 2013.
- (ed. with J. M. Bernstein and Ann Laura Stoler) Political Concepts: A Critical Lexicon. Fordham University Press, 2017. ISBN 978-0823276684
- (with Ishay Rosen-Zvi) Goy: Israel's Multiple Others and the Birth of the Gentile. Oxford University Press, 2018. ISBN 978-0-19-874490-0
- In the Beginning Was the State: Divine Violence in the Hebrew Bible. Fordham University Press, 2023.
