= Eugene Marion Klaaren =

Historian and professor of religion (1937–2015)

- Born: August 9, 1937
- Died: October 17, 2015 (aged 78)
- Education: Hope College BA, Emory University MA, Western Theological Seminary BD, Harvard University PhD
- Notable work: Religious Origins of Modern Science: Belief in Creation in Seventeenth-Century Thought

Eugene Marion Klaaren (August 9, 1937 – October 17, 2015) was a historian and professor of religion. He held a BA from Hope College, an MA from Emory University, a BD from Western Theological Seminary, and a PhD from Harvard University. He then became an Emeritus Professor of Wesleyan University. His book Religious Origins of Modern Science: Belief in Creation in Seventeenth-Century Thought (Eerdmans, 1977) remains "an important one. It is written in a scholarly and fairly dense style but is also accessible to non-specialists." He is noted for his scholarly work on the relationship between religious belief and the development of modern science. His Religious Origins book is based on his PhD thesis: "Belief in creation and the rise of modern science a study in the representative natural philosophy and theology of Robert Boyle and other seventeenth century figures" (1970). Klaaren died in 2015 at the age of 78, survived by his wife of 54 years, Mary.

== Selected works ==
- Religious origins of modern science : belief in creation in seventeenth-century thought (1977)
- Dooyeweerd's criticism of Kant (1960)
