= Menachem Fisch =

Israeli philosopher

- מנחם פיש
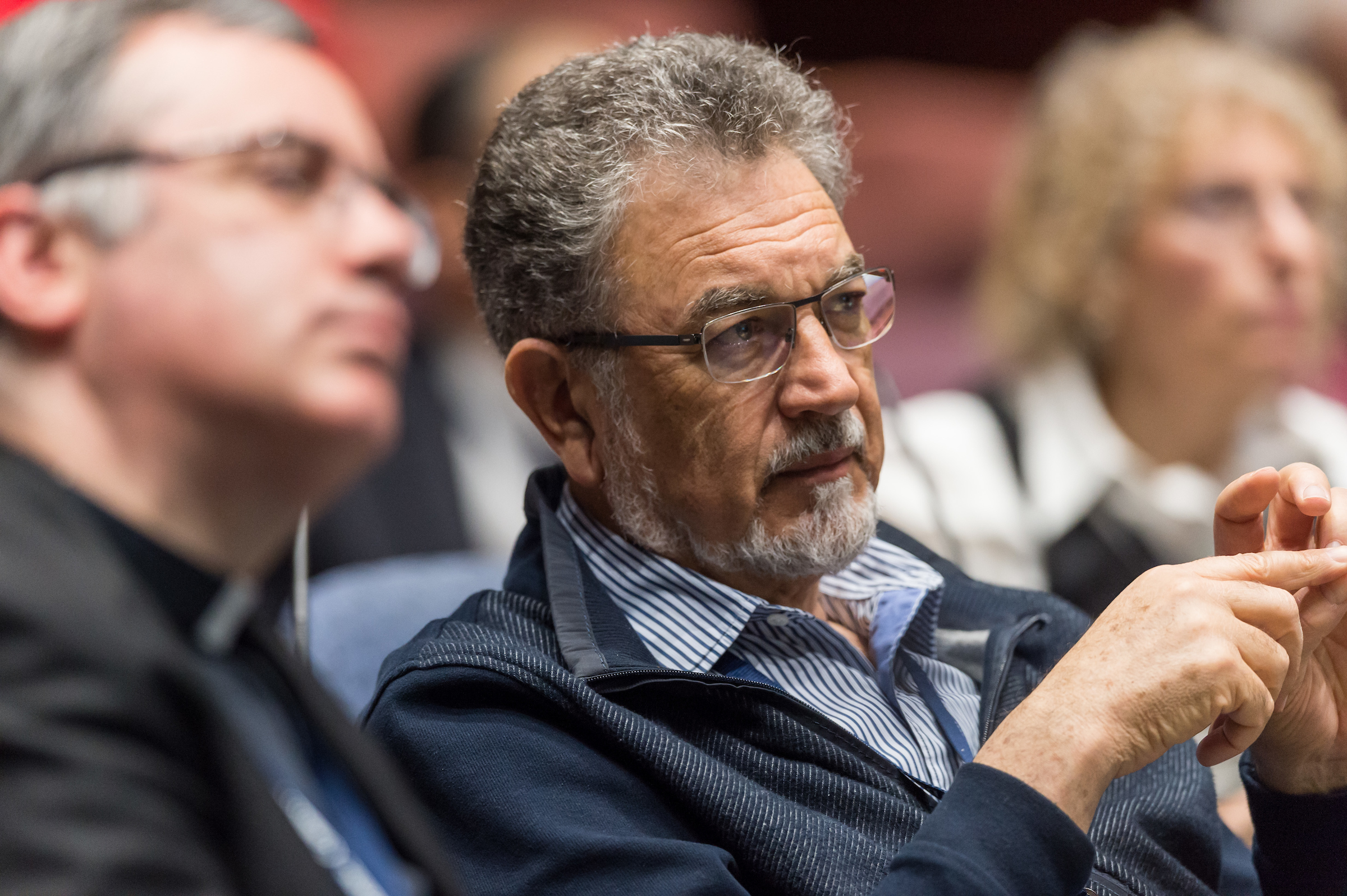
- Fisch in 2017
- Born: July 30, 1948 (age 78); Leeds, England

Education
- Education: Tel Aviv University; Queen's College, Oxford

Philosophical work
- Main interests: Philosophy of science, philosophy of language, philosophy of mind, rationality, normativity, and Jewish philosophy

Menachem Fisch (Hebrew: מנחם פיש; born 1948) is an Israeli philosopher. He is the Joseph and Ceil Mazer Professor Emeritus of History and Philosophy of Science, and co-director of the Frankfurt-Tel Aviv Center for the Study of Religious and Interreligious Dynamics at Tel Aviv University. He is also Senior Fellow of the Goethe University's Forschungskolleg Humanwissenschaften, Bad Homburg.

Fisch has published widely on the history of 19th-century British science and mathematics, on confirmation theory, on rationality and agency, on the theology of the talmudic literature, and the philosophy of talmudic legal reasoning. His more recent work explores the limits of normative self-criticism, the Talmud's dialogism and dispute of religiosity, the historiography and narratology of scientific framework transitions, political emotions, and the possibility of articulating a pluralist and liberal political philosophy from within the assumptions of traditional Judaism. Fisch's current philosophical work focuses on reflexive emotions.

Fisch has been a member of the Institute for Advanced Study, Princeton, Fellow of the Wissenshaftskolleg, the Berlin Institute for Advanced Study, and the Dibner Institute for the History of Science and Technology, MIT, senior visiting fellow at Collegium Budapest, visiting scholar at Trinity College, Cambridge, and was a long-term senior research fellow at the Shalom Hartman Institute, Jerusalem.

== Awards and honors ==
- February 2004: The Crown-Minnow Lectures at the University of Notre Dame.
- 2016: recipient of The Humboldt Prize.
- 2017: Doctor Honoris Causa in religious philosophy from the Goethe University, Frankfurt.
- 2018: Senior Fellow, the Goethe University's Forschungskolleg Humanwissenschaften, Bad Homburg.
- January 2020: The Dagmar Westberg Lectures at the Goethe University, Frankfurt.
- In 2020, a collection of engagements with his work entitled: Changing One's Mind: Philosophy, Religion And Science, (edited by. Y. Schwartz, P. Franks and C. Wiese), was published as a special issue of Open Philosophy (3, 2020)
- 2023: Distinguished Fellow, Buber Rosenzweig Institute for Modern and Contemporary Jewish Intellectual and Cultural History, Goethe University, Frankfurt
- November 2023: The Liss Lecture at the University of Notre Dame.
- February 2024: The Yerushah Lecture at Cambridge University (with Debra Band).
- July 2024: The Josef Horovitz Lecture, Goethe University, Frankfurt (with Debra Band)

== Publications ==
=== Books ===
- (PhD dissertation) Antithetical knowledge : William Whewell's theory of Science, its development and historiographical implications, Tel Aviv University, 1986.
- William Whewell Philosopher of Science, Oxford University Press, 1991
- William Whewell: A Composite Portrait, Oxford University Press, 1991 (edited with S.J. Schaffer)
- To Know Wisdom - Science, Rationality and Torah-study, (Hebrew), Tel Aviv, 1994
- Rational Rabbis: Science and Talmudic Culture, Indiana University Press, 1997
- The View from Within: Normativity and the Limits of Self-Criticism, University of Notre Dame Press, 2011 (with Y. Benbaji)
- Creatively Undecided: Toward a History and Philosophy of Scientific Agency, The University of Chicago Press, 2017
- Covenant of Confrontation: A Study of Non-Submissive Religiosity in Rabbinic Literature (Hebrew), Bar Ilan University Press, 2019.
- The Enemy Within: Political Zionism and its Faithful Adversaries (Hebrew), Tel Aviv University Press, 2021.
- Qohelet: Searching for a Life Worth Living, Baylor University Press, 2023 (with Debra Band).
- Reflexive Emotions: Shame, Humor, Humility, SpringerBriefs in Philosophy, 2025.
- Dialogues of Reason: Science, Politics, Religion (The Dagmar Westberg Lectures 2020, with critical engagements by Julie E. Cooper, Lorraine Daston, Suzanne Last Stone, Matthias Lutz-Bachmann, and Christian Wiese), Echter Verlag, (forthcoming) 2026
