= TLV1 =

Podcasting network from Tel Aviv, Israel

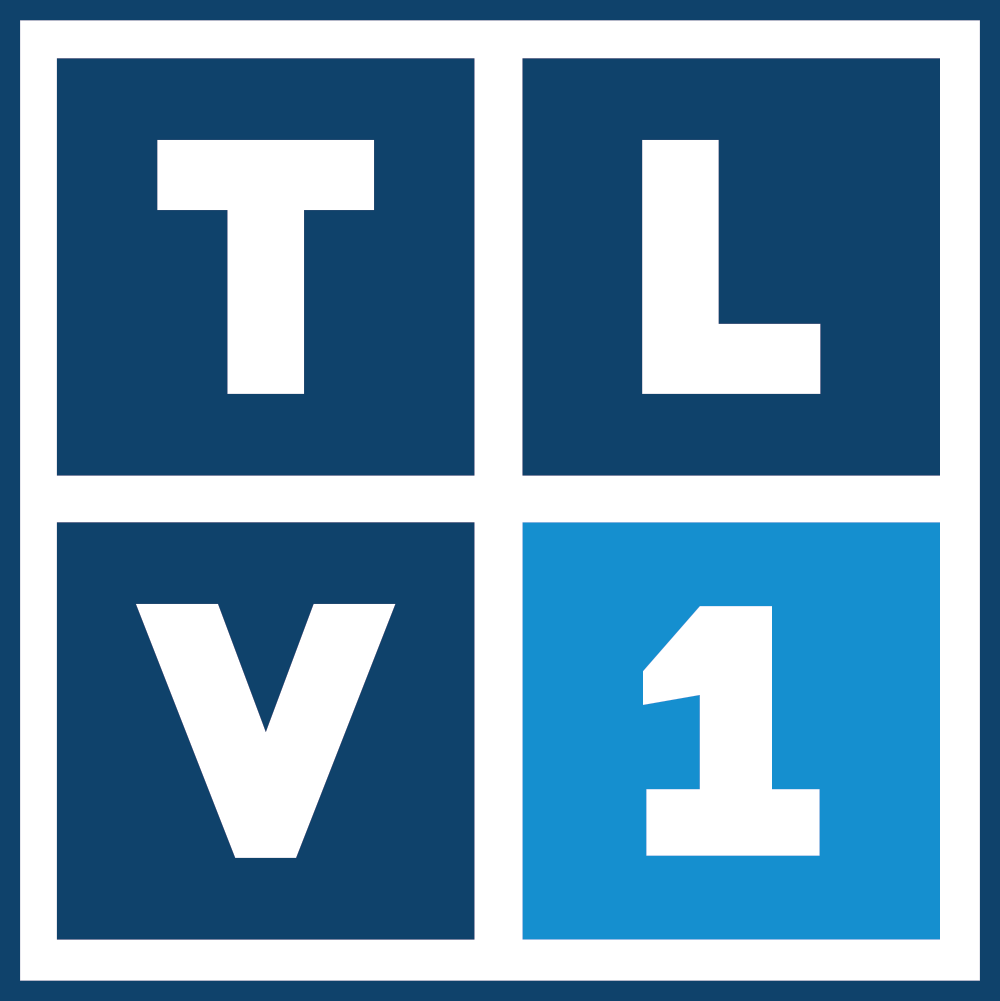
- Industry: Podcasting
- Founded: 2013
- Founder: Avner Shelem
- Headquarters: Tel Aviv, Israel
- Website: tlv1.fm

TLV1 is an English-language podcast network based in Tel Aviv, Israel. It was founded by Silicon Valley entrepreneur and venture capitalist Avner Shelem, and records at its studios at Kikar HaMedina.
