= Christopher B. Kaiser =

Dr. Christopher B. Kaiser PhD
- Professor of Historical and Systematic Theology at Western Theological Seminary
- In office: Since 1976
- Other posts: Lecturer in Physics. Gordon College (1968–1971); Wenham, Massachusetts

Orders
- Ordination: 1980

Personal details
- Born: Christopher Barina Kaiser; 1941 (age 84–85) Greenwich, Connecticut
- Denomination: Reformed Christian
- Residence: Holland, Michigan (1976–2017)
- Spouse: Martha
- Children: 3 Children
- Education: University of Edinburgh; Gordon-Conwell Theological Seminary; University of Colorado Boulder; Harvard University

Christopher Barina Kaiser is a noted author and scholar, with doctorates in astrophysics (Harvard University/University of Colorado Boulder) and Christian dogmatics (University of Edinburgh). His Creation and the History of Science (1991) received an outstanding book award from the Templeton Foundation. Henry Margenau and William G. Pollard, by his own admission, were two writers who influenced him as a science student in the 1960s.

== Published works ==
- Christopher B. Kaiser (2007). Toward a Theology of Scientific Endeavour: The Descent of Science. Ashgate Publishing, Ltd. p. 261. ISBN 978-0-7546-4159-9.
- Christopher B Kaiser (2001). The Doctrine of God. Wipf & Stock. ISBN 1-57910-549-1.
- Christopher B. Kaiser (1997). Creational Theology and the History of Physical Science: The Creationist Tradition from Basil to Bohr. Brill. p. 449. ISBN 90-04-10669-3.
- Christopher B. Kaiser (1991). Creation and the History of Science. W.B. Eerdmans. p. 316. ISBN 0-8028-0197-8.

Citation: Science and Religion in the English Speaking World, 1600-1727 A Bibliographic Guide to the Secondary Literature, Richard S. Brooks & David K. Himrod, Scarecrow Press, 2001, ISBN 0-8108-4011-1, page 241:

This is a wide-ranging survey of the interaction of the doctrine of creation and physical science from the patristic writers of the early church to Einstein and Bohr. It is a useful volume in a series of introductory textbooks in the history of theology. His approach is similar to that of the history-of-ideas school. Kaiser argues that the basic theme in the "creation tradition" is "that the entire universe is subject to a single code of law which was established along with the universe at the beginning of time." This theme manifested itself in four flexible ideas: (1) the comprehensibility of the world; (2) the unity of earth and heaven; (3) the relative autonomy of nature; and (4) the ministry of health care and reconciliation. A majority of the book deals with theologians and natural philosophers from the sixteenth through the eighteenth centuries. Kaiser discusses many of the topics important for this bibliography--from hermeticism to the Puritan thesis. For example, he has an interesting insight into the relation between Newton's Arianism and his views of space and time. Kaiser is good on the details of theological differences and theological rationale. In this, his work complements those historians of science who miss the nuances within theological debates. The usefulness of Kaiser's book is partially frustrated by a lack of footnotes, some correctable mistakes, and some overapplications of his thesis to particular figures. Overall, however, it is recommended as a replacement for Dillenberger's comparable survey.

- Christopher B Kaiser (2003). "Climbing Jacob's ladder: John Calvin and the early church on our eucharistic ascent to heaven". Vol. 56, no. 3. Scottish Journal of Theology. pp. 247–267.
- Christopher B Kaiser (1996). "Quantum Complementarity and Christological Dialectic". pp. 291–300. In Book: Religion & Science: History, Method, Dialogue (ISBN 0-4159-1666-6)

== Astrophysics ==
His astrophysics doctoral thesis was titled The thermal emission of interplanetary dust cloud models, published by the University of Colorado Boulder in 1968.
