= List of lay Catholic scientists =

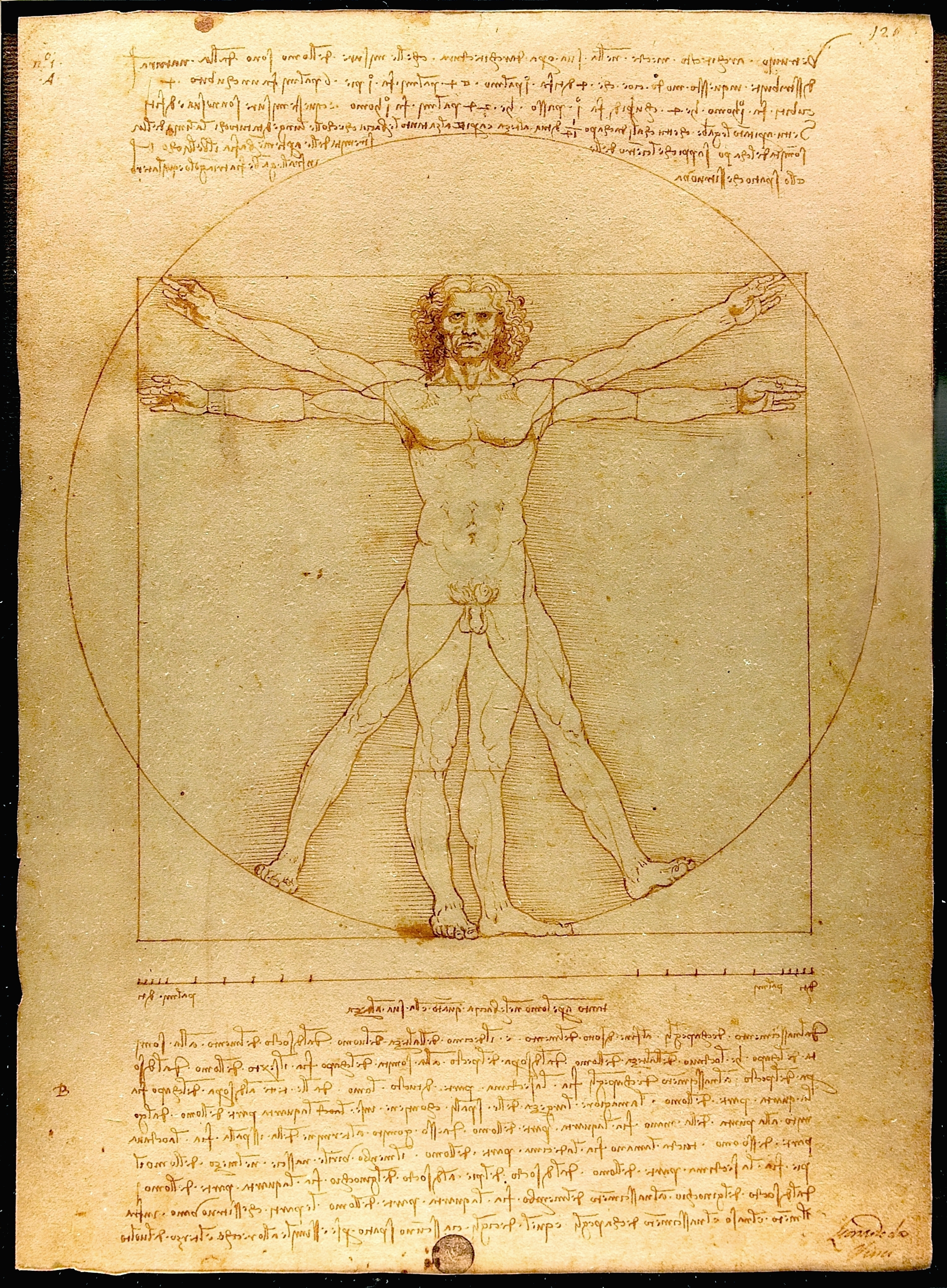
"The Vitruvian Man" by Leonardo da Vinci

Many Catholics have made significant contributions to the development of science and mathematics from the Middle Ages to today. These scientists include Galileo Galilei, René Descartes, Louis Pasteur, Blaise Pascal, André-Marie Ampère, Charles-Augustin de Coulomb, Pierre de Fermat, Antoine Laurent Lavoisier, Alessandro Volta, Augustin-Louis Cauchy, Pierre Duhem, Jean-Baptiste Dumas, Alois Alzheimer, Georgius Agricola, and Christian Doppler.

== Lay Catholic scientists ==
=== A ===
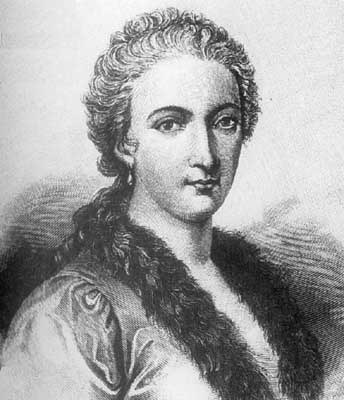
Maria Gaetana Agnesi

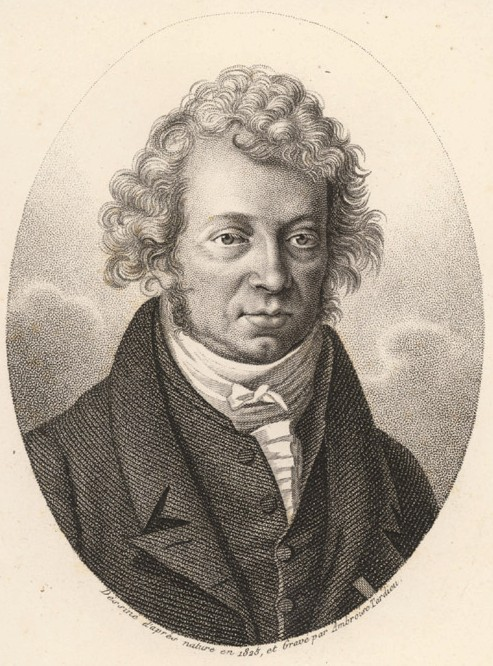
André-Marie Ampère

- Maria Gaetana Agnesi (1718–1799) – mathematician who wrote on differential and integral calculus
- Georgius Agricola (1494–1555) – father of mineralogy
- Ulisse Aldrovandi (1522–1605) – father of natural history
- Rudolf Allers (1883–1963) – Austrian psychiatrist; the only Catholic member of Sigmund Freud's first group, later a critic of Freudian psychoanalysis
- Alois Alzheimer (1864–1915) – credited with identifying the first published case of presenile dementia, which is now known as Alzheimer's disease
- André-Marie Ampère (1775–1836) – one of the main discoverers of electromagnetism
- Monica Asman (1920-2016) – American nun and entomologist, studied mosquito vector genetics
- Leopold Auenbrugger (1722–1809) – first to use percussion as a diagnostic technique in medicine
- Adrien Auzout (1622–1691) – astronomer who contributed to the development of the telescopic micrometer
- Amedeo Avogadro (1776–1856) – Italian scientist noted for contributions to molecular theory and Avogadro's Law

=== B ===
- Jacques Babinet (1794–1872) – French physicist, mathematician, and astronomer who is best known for his contributions to optics
- Franz Xaver von Baader (1765–1841) - German mining engineer and theologian. He gained a prize of 117 kg silver for his new method of employing sodium sulfate instead of potash in the making of glass.
- Eva von Bahr (1874–1962) Swedish physicist and first female docent in Sweden
- Stefan Banach (1892–1945) – Polish mathematician, founder of modern functional analysis
- Stephen M. Barr (1953–) – professor emeritus in the Department of Physics and Astronomy at the University of Delaware and a member of its Bartol Research Institute; founding president of the Society of Catholic Scientists
- Joachim Barrande (1799–1883) – French geologist and paleontologist who studied fossils from the Lower Palaeozoic rocks of Bohemia
- Laura Bassi (1711–1778) – physicist at the University of Bologna and Chair in experimental physics at the Bologna Institute of Sciences, the first woman to be offered a professorship at a European university
- Antoine César Becquerel (1788–1878) – pioneer in the study of electric and luminescent phenomena
- Henri Becquerel (1852–1908) – awarded the Nobel Prize in physics for his co-discovery of radioactivity
- Carlo Beenakker (1960–) – professor at Leiden University and leader of the university's mesoscopic physics group, established in 1992.
- Giovanni Battista Belzoni (1778–1823) – prolific Italian explorer and pioneer archaeologist of Egyptian antiquities
- Pierre-Joseph van Beneden (1809–1894) – Belgian zoologist and paleontologist who established one of the world's first marine laboratories and aquariums
- Claude Bernard (1813–1878) – physiologist who helped to apply scientific methodology to medicine
- Jacques Philippe Marie Binet (1786–1856) – mathematician known for Binet's formula and his contributions to number theory
- Jean-Baptiste Biot (1774–1862) – physicist who established the reality of meteorites and studied polarization of light
- Evelyn Livingston Billings (1918–2013) – Australian pediatrician; co-developed the Billings ovulation method with her husband, John Billings
- John Billings (1918–2007) – Australian neurologist; co-developed the Billings ovulation method with his wife, Evelyn Livingston Billings
- John Birmingham (astronomer) (1816–1884) – Irish astronomer who discovered the recurrent nova T Coronae Borealis and revised and extended Schjellerup's Catalogue of Red Stars
- Henri Marie Ducrotay de Blainville (1777–1850) – zoologist and anatomist who coined the term paleontology and described several new species of reptiles
- Giovanni Alfonso Borelli (1608–1679) – often referred to as the father of modern biomechanics
- Raoul Bott (1923–2005) – mathematician known for numerous basic contributions to geometry in its broad sense
- Marcella Boveri (née O'Grady; 1863–1950) – biologist and first woman to graduate from the Massachusetts Institute of Technology, wife of Theodor Boveri
- Theodor Boveri (1862–1915) – first to hypothesize the cellular processes that cause cancer
- Louis Braille (1809–1852) – inventor of the Braille reading and writing system
- Edouard Branly (1844–1940) – inventor and physicist known for his involvement in wireless telegraphy and his invention of the Branly coherer
- James Britten (1846–1924) – botanist, member of the Catholic Truth Society and Knight Commander of the Order of St. Gregory the Great
- Hermann Brück (1905–2000) – Astronomer Royal for Scotland from 1957–1975; honored by Pope John Paul II
- Mary Brück (1925–2008) – Irish astronomer and historian of astronomy
- Albert Brudzewski (c. 1445 – c. 1497) – first to state that the Moon moves in an ellipse

=== C ===
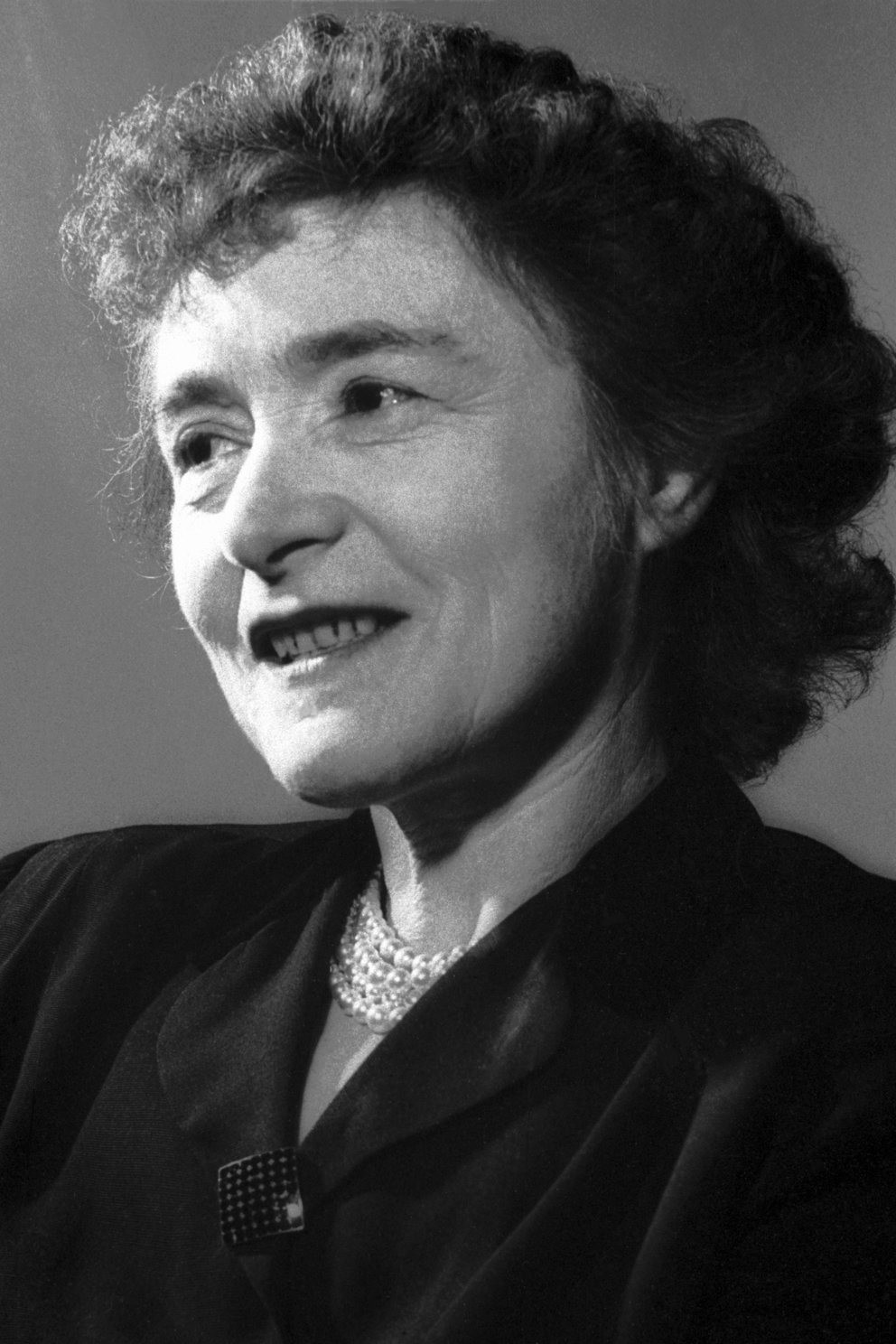
Gerty Cori

- Nicola Cabibbo (1935–2010) – Italian physicist, discoverer of the universality of weak interactions (Cabibbo angle), President of the Pontifical Academy of Sciences from 1993 until his death
- Alexis Carrel (1873–1944) – awarded the Nobel Prize in Medicine for pioneering vascular suturing techniques
- John Casey (mathematician) (1820–1891) – Irish geometer known for Casey's theorem
- Giovanni Domenico Cassini (1625–1712) – first to observe four of Saturn's moons and the co-discoverer of the Great Red Spot on Jupiter
- Augustin-Louis Cauchy (1789–1857) – mathematician who was an early pioneer in analysis
- Andrea Cesalpino (c. 1525 – 1603) – botanist who also theorized on the circulation of blood
- Jean-François Champollion (1790–1832) – published the first translation of the Rosetta Stone
- Michel Chasles (1793–1880) – mathematician who elaborated on the theory of modern projective geometry and was awarded the Copley Medal
- Guy de Chauliac (c. 1300 – 1368) – most eminent surgeon of the Middle Ages
- Chien-jen Chen (1951–) – Taiwanese epidemiologist researching hepatitis B, liver cancer risk of people with hepatitis B, link of arsenic to blackfoot disease, etc.
- Michel Eugène Chevreul (1786–1889) – considered one of the major figures in the early development of organic chemistry; stated "Those who know me also know that born a Catholic, the son of Christian parents, I live and I mean to die a Catholic"
- Agnes Mary Clerke (1842–1907) – Irish astronomer and science educator
- Mateo Realdo Colombo (1516–1559) – discovered the pulmonary circuit, which paved the way for Harvey's discovery of circulation
- Arthur W. Conway (1876–1950) – remembered for his application of biquaternion algebra to the special theory of relativity
- E. J. Conway (1894–1968) – Irish biochemist known for works pertaining to electrolyte physiology and analytical chemistry
- Carl Ferdinand Cori (1896–1984) – shared the 1947 Nobel Prize in Physiology or Medicine with his wife for their discovery of the Cori cycle
- Gerty Cori (1896–1957) – biochemist who was the first American woman win a Nobel Prize in science (1947)
- Gaspard-Gustave Coriolis (1792–1843) – formulated laws regarding rotating systems, which later became known as the Coriolis effect
- Domenico Cotugno (1736–1822) – Italian anatomist who discovered the nasopalatine nerve, demonstrated the existence of the labyrinthine fluid, and formulated a theory of resonance and hearing, among other important contributions
- Angélique du Coudray (c. 1712 – 1794) – head midwife at the Hôtel-Dieu, Paris, inventor of the first lifesize obstetrical mannequin, and author of an early midwifery textbook; commissioned by Louis XV to teach midwifery to rural women, she taught over 30,000 students over almost three decades
- Maurice Couette (1858–1943) – best known for his contributions to rheology and the theory of fluid flow; appointed a Knight of the Order of St. Gregory the Great by Pope Pius XI in 1925
- Charles-Augustin de Coulomb (1736–1806) – physicist known for developing Coulomb's law
- Clyde Cowan (1919–1974) – co-discoverer of the neutrino
- Jean Cruveilhier (1791–1874) – made important contributions to the study of the nervous system and was the first to describe the lesions associated with multiple sclerosis; originally planned to enter the priesthood
- Endre Czeizel (1935–2015) – discovered that folic acid prevents or reduces the formation of more serious developmental disorders, such as neural tube defects like spina bifida

=== D ===
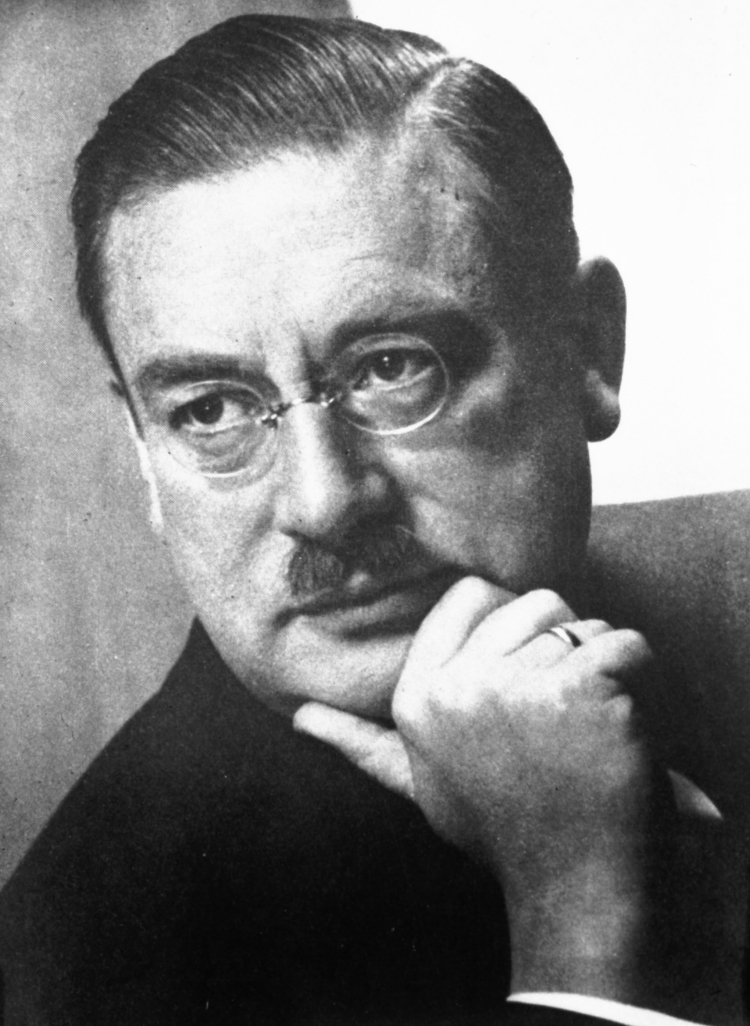
Peter Debye

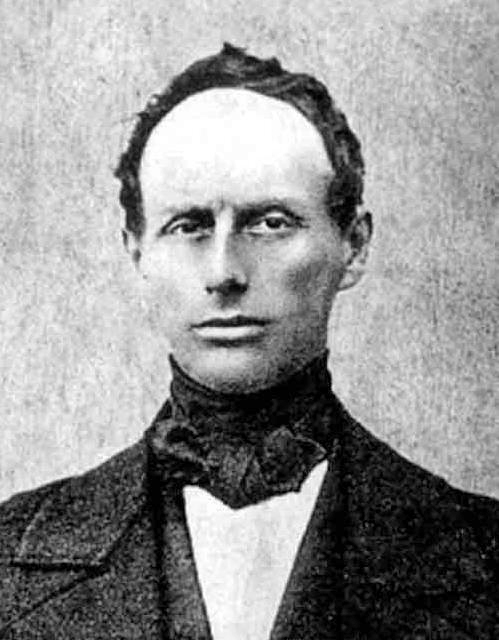
Christian Doppler

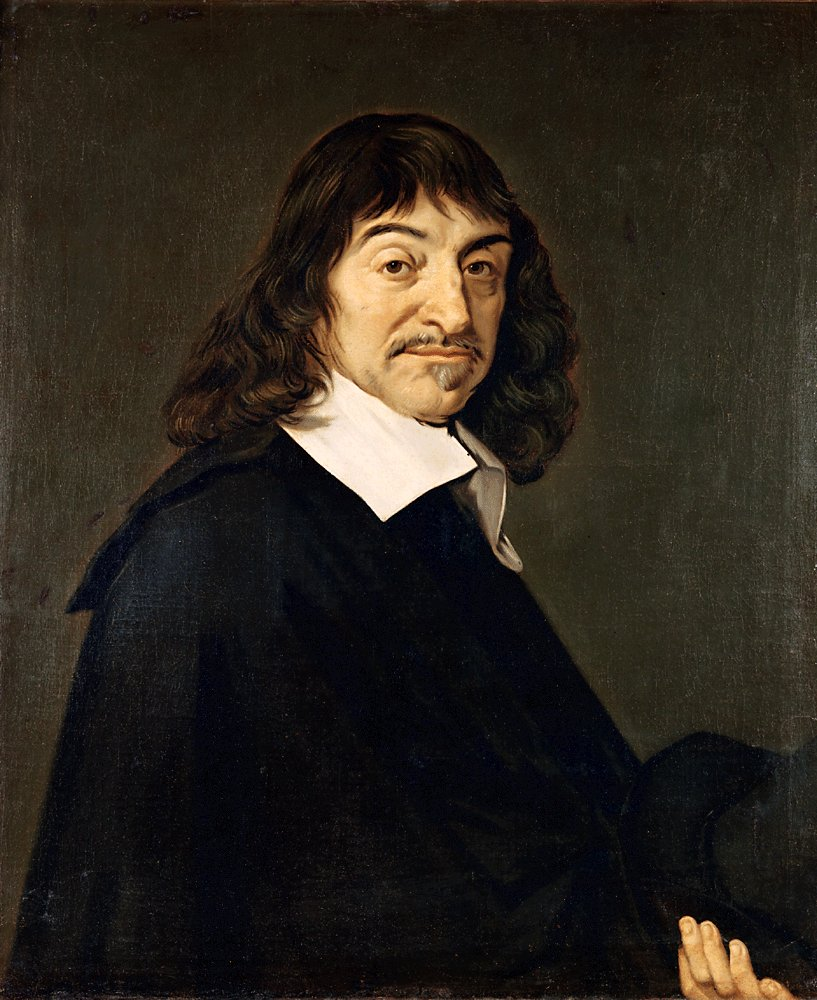
René Descartes

- Gabriel Auguste Daubrée (1814–1896) – pioneer in the application of experimental methods to the study of diverse geologic phenomena
- Peter Debye (1884–1966) – awarded the Nobel Prize in Chemistry in 1936 "for his contributions to our knowledge of molecular structure through his investigations on dipole moments and on the diffraction of X-rays and electrons in gases."
- Piedad de la Cierva (1903–2007) – Spanish scientist, pioneer in the study of artificial radiation in Spain and in the industrialization of optical glass.
- Charles Enrique Dent (1911–1976) – British biochemist who defined new amino-acid diseases such as various forms of Fanconi syndrome, Hartnup disease, argininosuccinic aciduria and homocystinuria
- César-Mansuète Despretz (1791–1863) – chemist and physicist who investigated latent heat, the elasticity of vapors, the compressibility of liquids, and the density of gases
- Máirin de Valéra (1912–1984) Irish botanist; deeply Catholic, attending daily Mass whenever possible
- Peter Dodson (1946–) – American paleontologist at the University of Pennsylvania; co-editor of The Dinosauria, widely considered the definitive scholarly reference on dinosaurs
- Ignacy Domeyko (1802–1889) – Polish scientist who made major contributions to the study of Chile's geography, geology, and mineralogy
- Christian Doppler (1803–1853) – Austrian physicist and mathematician who enunciated the Doppler effect
- Mary Douglas (1921-2007) - British anthropologist, known for her writings on human culture, symbolism and risk.
- Pierre Duhem (1861–1916) – historian of science who made important contributions to hydrodynamics, elasticity, and thermodynamics
- Félix Dujardin (1801–1860) – biologist remembered for his research on protozoans and other invertebrates; became a devout Catholic later in life and was known to read The Imitation of Christ
- Jean-Baptiste Dumas (1800–1884) – chemist who established new values for the atomic mass of thirty elements
- André Dumont (1809–1857) – Belgian geologist who prepared the first geological map of Belgium and named many of the subdivisions of the Cretaceous and Tertiary
- Charles Dupin (1784–1873) – mathematician who discovered the Dupin cyclide and the Dupin indicatrix

=== E ===
- Stephan Endlicher (1804–1849) – botanist who formulated a major system of plant classification
- Bartolomeo Eustachi (c. 1500 – 1574) – one of the founders of human anatomy

=== F ===
- Jean-Henri Fabre (1823–1915) – naturalist, entomologist, and science writer; "The Homer of Insects"
- Hieronymus Fabricius (1537–1619) – father of embryology
- Gabriele Falloppio (1523–1562) – pioneering Italian anatomist who studied the human ear and reproductive organs
- Mary Celine Fasenmyer (1906–1996) – religious sister and mathematician, founder of Sister Celine's polynomials
- Hervé Faye (1814–1902) – astronomer whose discovery of the periodic comet 4P/Faye won him the 1844 Lalande Prize and membership in the French Academy of Sciences
- Pierre de Fermat (1601–1665) – number theorist who contributed to the early development of calculus
- Jean Fernel (1497–1558) – physician who introduced the term physiology
- Fibonacci (c. 1170 – c. 1250) – popularized Hindu-Arabic numerals in Europe and discovered the Fibonacci sequence
- Hippolyte Fizeau (1819–1896) – first person to determine experimentally the velocity of light
- Lawrence Flick (1856–1938) – American physician who pioneered research and treatment of tuberculosis
- Emily Fortey (1866–1946) – British chemist and politician who investigated synthetic cyclohexane and cyclohexane in fractions of crude oil; converted to Catholicism in 1884
- Philip G. Fothergill FRSE (1908–1967) – British biologist and historian of science
- Léon Foucault (1819–1868) – invented the Foucault pendulum to measure the effect of the Earth's rotation
- Joseph von Fraunhofer (1787–1826) – discovered Fraunhofer lines in the Sun's spectrum
- Augustin-Jean Fresnel (1788–1827) – made significant contributions to the theory of wave optics
- Johann Nepomuk von Fuchs (1774–1856) – confirmed the stoichiometric laws and observed isomorphism and the cation exchange of zeolites

=== G ===
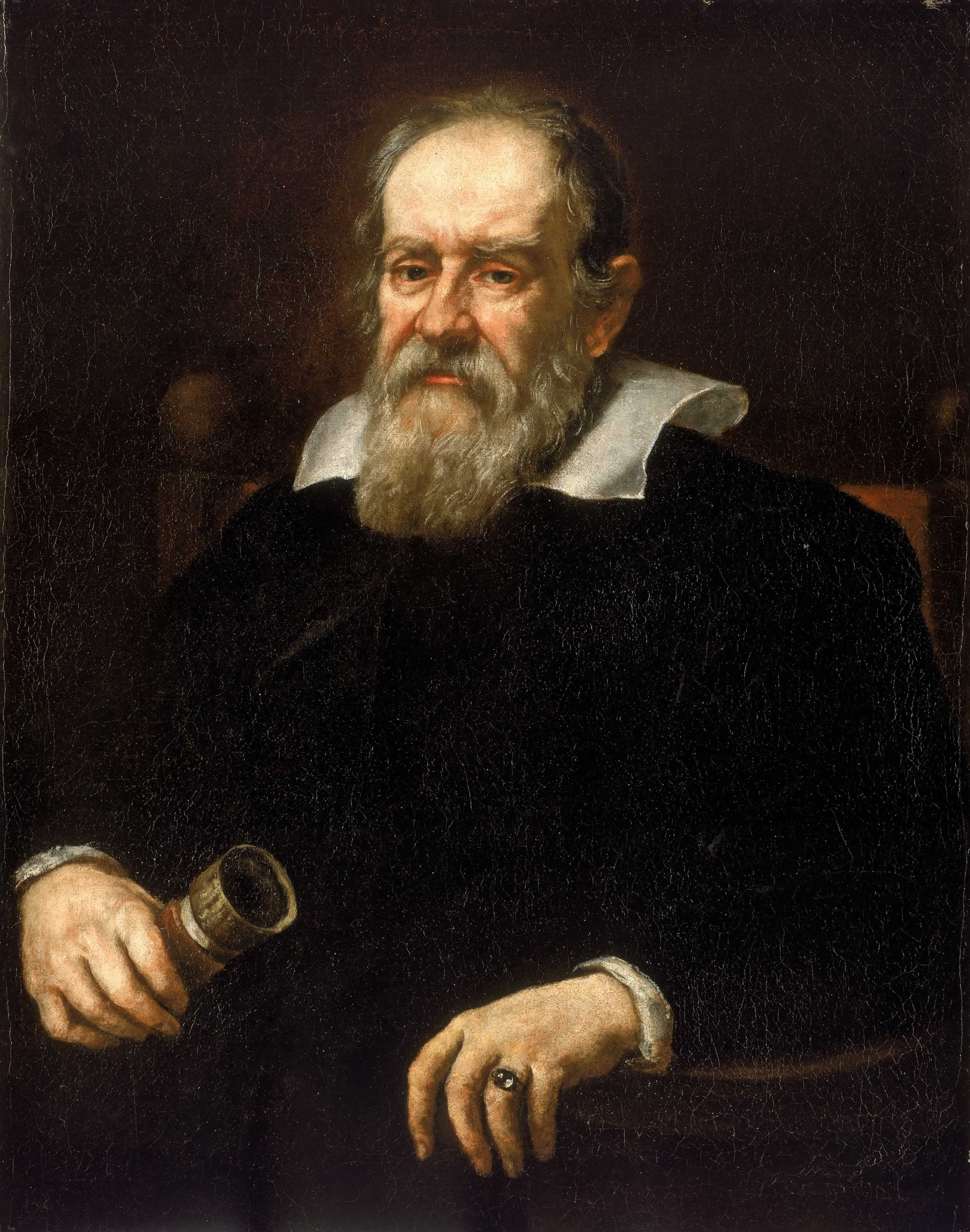
Galileo Galilei

- Galileo Galilei (1564–1642) – Considered a father of observational astronomy, modern-era classical physics, the scientific method, and modern science.
- Luigi Galvani (1737–1798) – formulated the theory of animal electricity
- Dorothy Annie Elizabeth Garrod (1892–1968) – archaeologist specialised in the Palaeolithic period
- William Gascoigne (1610–1644) – developed the first micrometer
- Paula González (1932–2016) – religious sister and professor of biology
- Johannes Gutenberg (c. 1398 – 1468) – inventor of the printing press
- Paul Guthnick (1879–1947) – astronomer who pioneered the application of photoelectric methods to the measurement of the brightness of celestial bodies

=== H ===
- Samuel Stehman Haldeman (1812–1880) – American naturalist and convert to Catholicism who researched fresh-water mollusks, the human voice, Amerindian dialects, and the organs of sound of insects
- Jean Baptiste Julien d'Omalius d'Halloy (1783–1875) – one of the pioneers of modern geology
- Morgan Hebard (1887–1946) – American entomologist who described over 800 new species of orthopteroids and compiled an entomological collection of over 250,000 specimens
- Eduard Heis (1806–1877) – astronomer who contributed the first true delineation of the Milky Way
- Jan Baptist van Helmont (1579–1644) – founder of pneumatic chemistry
- Karl Herzfeld (1892–1978) – Austrian-American physicist who provided the first fundamental explanation of the mechanism of the absorption of sound by molecules
- Victor Franz Hess (1883–1964) – Austrian-American physicist, and Nobel laureate in physics, who discovered cosmic rays.
- George de Hevesy (1885–1966) – Hungarian radiochemist and Nobel laureate
- Charles Hermite (1822–1901) – mathematician who did research on number theory, quadratic forms, elliptic functions, and algebra
- John Philip Holland (1840–1914) – developed the first submarine to be formally commissioned by the US Navy

=== J ===
- Antoine Laurent de Jussieu (1748–1836) – first to propose a natural classification of flowering plants

=== K ===
- Karl Kehrle (1898–1996) – Benedictine Monk of Buckfast Abbey, England; beekeeper; world authority on bee breeding, developer of the Buckfast bee
- Mary Kenneth Keller (c. 1914 – 1985) – Sister of Charity and first American woman to earn a PhD in computer science
- Annie Chambers Ketchum (1824–1904) – convert to Catholicism and botanist who published Botany for academies and colleges: consisting of plant development and structure from seaweed to clematis
- Marie-Victorin Kirouac (1885–1944) – Christian Brother and botanist best known as the father of the Jardin botanique de Montréal
- Brian Kobilka (1955–) – American Nobel Prize winning professor who teaches at Stanford University School of Medicine
- Karl Kreil (1798–1862) – meteorologist and astronomer who conducted important studies of terrestrial magnetism
- Stephanie Kwolek (1923–2014) – chemist who developed Kevlar at DuPont in 1965

=== L ===
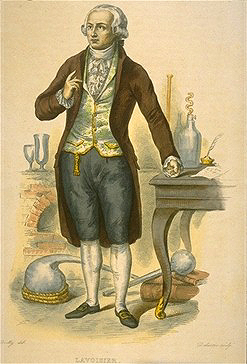
Antoine Lavoisier

- René Laennec (1781–1826) – physician who invented the stethoscope
- Laurent Lafforgue (1966–) – mathematician, winner of Fields Medal
- Joseph Louis Lagrange (1736–1813) – mathematician and astronomer known for Lagrangian points and Lagrangian mechanics
- Jean-Baptiste Lamarck (1744–1829) – French naturalist, biologist and academic whose theories on evolution preceded those of Darwin
- Johann von Lamont (1805–1879) – astronomer and physicist who studied the magnetism of the Earth and was the first to calculate the mass of Uranus
- Karl Landsteiner (1868–1943) – Nobel Prize winner who identified and classified the human blood types
- Pierre André Latreille (1762–1833) – pioneer in entomology
- Antoine Lavoisier (1743–1794) – father of modern chemistry
- Marie-Anne Paulze Lavoisier (1758–1836) – working with her husband, she was instrumental to the standardization of the scientific method.
- Claude-Nicolas Le Cat (1700–1768) – invented or perfected several instruments for lithotomy and was one of the first adherents of a mechanistic approach to physiology
- Georges-Louis Leclerc, Comte de Buffon (1707–1788) – one of the pioneers of natural history, especially through his monumental Histoire Naturelle
- Xavier Le Pichon (1937– ) – French geophysicist; known for his comprehensive model of plate tectonics, helping create the field of plate tectonics
- Jérôme Lejeune (1926–1994) – pediatrician and geneticist, best known for his discovery of the link of diseases to chromosome abnormalities
- Jacques Jean Lhermitte (1877–1959) – French neurologist and neuropsychiatrist; clinical director at the Salpêtrière Hospital
- André Lichnerowicz (1915–1998) – French differential geometer and mathematical physicist considered the founder of modern Poisson geometry
- Karl August Lossen (1841–1893) – geologist who mapped and described the Harz Mountains
- Jonathan Lunine (1959–) – planetary scientist at the forefront of research into planet formation, evolution, and habitability; serves as vice-president of the Society of Catholic Scientists

=== M ===
- William James MacNeven (1763–1841) – Irish-American physician and chemist who was an early proponent of atomic theory
- Juan Martín Maldacena (1968–) – Argentine theoretical physicist, first Carl P. Feinberg Professor of Theoretical Physics in the Institute for Advanced Study's School of Natural Sciences, and first proponent of AdS/CFT correspondence
- Marcello Malpighi (1628–1694) – father of comparative physiology
- Anna Morandi Manzolini (1714–1774) – anatomist and anatomical wax artist who lectured at the University of Bologna
- Giovanni Manzolini (1700–1755) – anatomical wax artist and Professor of anatomy at the University of Bologna
- Guglielmo Marconi (1874–1937) – father of wireless technology and radio transmission
- Luigi Ferdinando Marsili (1658–1730) – one of the founders of modern oceanography
- Pierre Louis Maupertuis (1698–1759) – known for the Maupertuis principle and for being the first president of the Berlin Academy of Science
- Agnes McLaren (1837–1913) – Scottish physician who inspired other women to dedicate their medical knowledge to the care of the poor. First female to graduate as medical doctor from the University of Montpellier.
- Michele Mercati (1541–1593) – one of the first to recognize prehistoric stone tools as man-made
- Charles W. Misner (1932–2023) – American cosmologist dedicated to the study of general relativity
- Kenneth R. Miller (1948–) – American cell biologist and molecular biologist who teaches at Brown University
- Mario J. Molina (1943–2020) – Mexican chemist, one of the precursors to the discovery of the Antarctic ozone hole (1995 Nobel Prize in Chemistry)
- John J. Montgomery (1858–1911) – American physicist and inventor of gliders and aerodynamics
- Giovanni Battista Morgagni (1682–1771) – father of modern anatomical pathology
- Helmut Moritz (1933–2022) – Austrian physical geodesist internationally known for fundamental work on error propagation in geodesy
- Marston Morse (1892–1977) – inventor of Morse Theory, one of the original members of the Institute for Advanced Study
- Johannes Peter Müller (1801–1858) – founder of modern physiology
- Joseph Murray (1919–2012) – Nobel Prize in Medicine laureate

=== N ===
- John von Neumann (1903–1957) – Hungarian-born American mathematician and polymath who converted to Catholicism
- Charles Nicolle (1866–1936) – French bacteriologist who received the 1928 Nobel Prize in Medicine for his identification of lice as the transmitter of epidemic typhus; came back to the Catholic Church at the end of his life
- Martin Nowak (1965–) – evolutionary theorist and Director of the Program for Evolutionary Dynamics at Harvard University; serves on the board of the Society of Catholic Scientists

=== O ===
- Niall Ó Glacáin (c. 1563 – 1653) – Irish physician who worked to treat victims of bubonic plague outbreaks in various places throughout Europe. He was a pioneer in pathological anatomy.
- Karin Öberg (1982–) – her Öberg Astrochemistry Group discovered the first complex organic molecule in a protoplanetary disk; serves on the board of the Society of Catholic Scientists
- Abraham Ortelius (1527–1598) – created the first modern atlas and theorized on continental drift
- Jean-Michel Oughourlian (1940–) – Armenian-French neuropsychiatrist and psychologist; President of the Association of Doctors of the American Hospital of Paris; honorary member of the Association Recherches Mimétiques

=== P ===
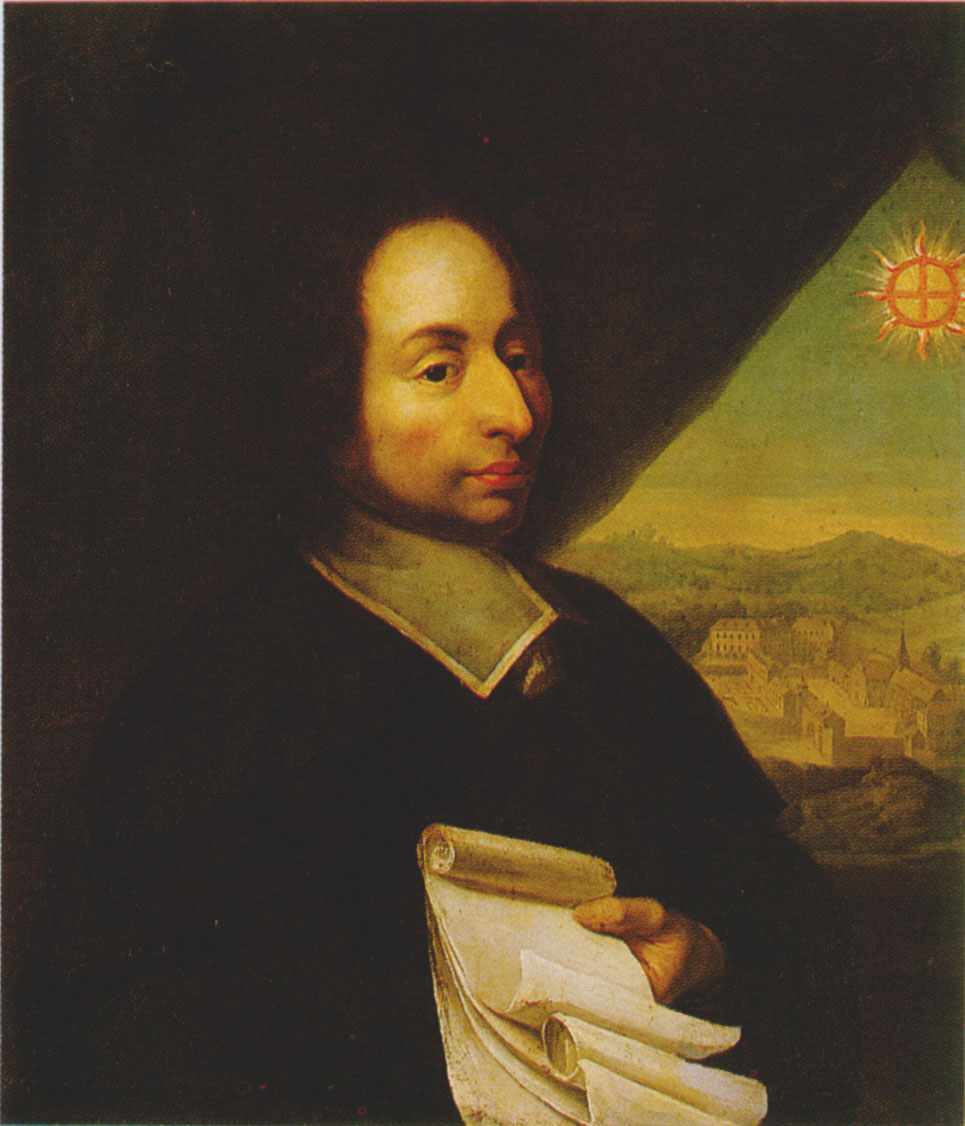
Blaise Pascal

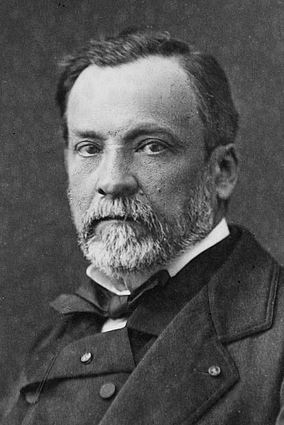
Louis Pasteur

- Blaise Pascal (1623–1662) – French mathematician, physicist, inventor, writer and philosopher
- Louis Pasteur (1822–1895) – father of bacteriology
- Pierre Joseph Pelletier (1788–1842) – co-discovered strychnine, caffeine, quinine, cinchonine, among many other discoveries in chemistry
- Georg von Peuerbach (1423–1461) – called the father of mathematical and observational astronomy in the West
- Gabrio Piola (1794–1850) – Italian physicist and mathematician who made fundamental contributions to continuum mechanics
- Giambattista della Porta (1535–1615) – Italian polymath, made contributions to agriculture, hydraulics, military engineering, and pharmacology
- Pierre Puiseux (1855–1928) – French astronomer who created a photographic atlas of the Moon

=== R ===
- Giancarlo Rastelli (1933–1970) – pioneering cardiac surgeon at the Mayo Clinic who developed the Rastelli procedure; he is a Servant of God in the Catholic Church
- René Antoine Ferchault de Réaumur (1683–1757) – scientific polymath known especially for his study of insects
- Francesco Redi (1626–1697) – his experiments with maggots were a major step in overturning the idea of spontaneous generation
- Henri Victor Regnault (1810–1878) – chemist with two laws governing the specific heat of gases named after him
- Gregorio Ricci-Curbastro (1853–1925) – one of the founders of tensor calculus
- Norbert Rillieux (1806–1894) – French-speaking Creole, one of the earliest chemical engineers and inventory of the multiple-effect evaporator
- Gilles de Roberval (1602–1675) – mathematician who studied the geometry of infinitesimals and was one of the founders of kinematic geometry
- Clemens C. J. Roothaan (1918–2019) – physicist known for developing the Roothaan equations
- Frederick Rossini (1899–1990) – Priestley Medal and Laetare Medal-winning chemist
- Paolo Ruffini (1765–1822) – Italian mathematician who contributed to the Abel–Ruffini theorem and described Ruffini's rule

=== S ===
- Paul Sabatier (chemist) (1854–1941) – awarded the Nobel Prize in Chemistry for his work improving the hydrogenation of organic species in the presence of metals
- Adhémar Jean Claude Barré de Saint-Venant (1797–1886) – remembered for Saint-Venant's principle, Saint-Venant's theorem, and Saint-Venant's compatibility condition; given the title Count by Pope Pius IX in 1869
- Theodor Schwann (1810–1882) – founder of the theory of the cellular structure of animal organisms
- Ignaz Semmelweis (1818–1865) – early pioneer of antiseptic procedures, discoverer of the cause of puerperal fever
- J. Wolfgang Smith (1930–2024) – mathematician, physicist, and philosopher of science
- Anne-Marie Staub (1914–2012) – French biochemist and chemist. Worked on Bacillus anthracis, the pathogen causing Anthrax.
- George Sperti (1900–1991) – inventor of Preparation H hemorrhoid medication, the Sperti Ultraviolet Lamp, and Aspercreme; co-founder of the Institutum Divi-Thomae and of the Basic Science Research Laboratory of the University of Cincinnati
- Horatio Storer (1830–1922) – physician; founder of the Gynaecological Society of Boston, the first medical society devoted exclusively to gynecology; leader of the "physicians' crusade against abortion"
- Karl Stern (1906–1975) – German-Canadian neurologist and psychiatrist; lecturer in neuropathology and assistant neuropathologist at the Montreal Neurological Institute
- Miriam Michael Stimson (1913–2002) – American Adrian Dominican Sister, chemist, and the second woman to lecture at the Sorbonne; played a role in the history of understanding DNA
- Jadwiga Szeptycka (1883–1939) – Polish archeologist and writer

=== T ===
- Louis Jacques Thénard (1777–1857) – discovered hydrogen peroxide and contributed to the discovery of boron
- Leonardo Torres Quevedo (1852–1936) – Spanish civil engineer, inventor and mathematician who was a pioneer in cable cars, airships, automatic machines and remote control.
- Evangelista Torricelli (1608–1647) – inventor of the barometer
- Paolo dal Pozzo Toscanelli (1397–1482) – Italian mathematician, astronomer and cosmographer
- Richard Towneley (1629–1707) – mathematician and astronomer whose work contributed to the formulation of Boyle's Law
- Louis René Tulasne (1815–1885) – biologist with several genera and species of fungi named after him

=== V ===
- Máirin de Valéra (1912–1984) – Irish botanist, expert in phycology
- Louis Nicolas Vauquelin (1763–1829) – discovered the chemical element beryllium
- Urbain Le Verrier (1811–1877) – mathematician who predicted the discovery of Neptune
- Andreas Vesalius (1514–1564) – father of modern human anatomy
- François Viète (1540–1603) – father of modern algebra
- Leonardo da Vinci (1452–1519) – Renaissance anatomist, scientist, mathematician, and painter
- Vincenzo Viviani (1622–1703) – mathematician known for Viviani's theorem, Viviani's curve and his work in determining the speed of sound
- Alessandro Volta (1745–1827) – physicist known for the invention of the battery

=== W ===
- Wilhelm Heinrich Waagen (1841–1900) – geologist and paleontologist who provided the first example of evolution described from the geologic record, after studying Jurassic ammonites
- James Joseph Walsh (1865–1942) – dean and professor of nervous diseases and of the history of medicine at Fordham University; Laetare Medal recipient
- Karl Weierstrass (1815–1897) – often called the father of modern analysis
- Anna Wierzbicka (1938–) – linguist, founder of the Natural Semantic Metalanguage (NSM), based at the Australian National University (ANU), her research was cited more than 41,000 times
- E. T. Whittaker (1873–1956) – English mathematician who made contributions to applied mathematics and mathematical physics
- Fr. Thomas Van Winkle (1922-1988)- American nuclear scientist who helped on the Manhattan project then later became a priest.
- Johann Joachim Winckelmann (1717–1768) – one of the founders of scientific archaeology
- Bertram Windle (1858–1929) – anthropologist, physician, and former president of University College Cork
- Jacob B. Winslow (1669–1760) – convert to Catholicism who was regarded as the greatest European anatomist of his day

=== Z ===
- Antonino Zichichi (1929–2026) – Italian nuclear physicist, former President of the Istituto Nazionale di Fisica Nucleare
- Gregory Zilboorg (1890–1959) – Ukrainian-American psychiatrist and historian of psychiatry

== See also ==
- Catholic Church and science
- Christianity and science
- Society of Catholic Scientists
- List of Catholic clergy scientists
- List of Catholic priests and religious awarded the Nobel Prize
