= Rastelli =

Rastelli is an Italian surname. Notable people with the surname include:

- Ellis Rastelli (born 1975), Italian cyclist
- Enrico Rastelli (1896–1931), Italian juggler, acrobat and performer
- Giancarlo Rastelli (1934–1970), Italian cardiac surgeon
  - Rastelli procedure, an open heart surgical procedure
- Maicol Rastelli (born 1991), Italian cross-country skier
- Massimo Rastelli (born 1968), Italian footballer and manager
- Philip Rastelli (1918–1991), American mobster
