= Maureen L. Condic =

American academic

- Citizenship: USA
- Scientific career
- Fields: Bioethics, fetal development, spinal cord regeneration

Maureen L. Condic is an American neurobiology professor, bioethicist, ombudsman, and appointee to the United States's National Science Board currently at the Catholic University of America.

== Research ==
Condic received her BA from the University of Chicago, and her PhD from the University of California, Berkeley. Her postdoctoral fellowship was undertaken at the University of Minnesota. She is an associate professor of neurobiology and anatomy at the University of Utah since 1997. Among her research contributions have been investigations into spinal cord development and regeneration, death determination, ethics around pregnancy, stem cell usage and development. In a 2018 Science interview, Condic was asked why she moved from being well established in her field of neuroscience (with a 2001 single-author paper in her field's leading journal reporting that alterations in a single gene could help adult neurons regenerate, and with two grants from the National Institutes of Health) into the then new field of bioethics. Condic said she moved due to a "heart-wrenching conversation" with a person suffering from a spinal cord injury concerning lack of availability of medical information, combined with concerns that the public was given false enthusiasm for spinal cord recovery after the injury to actor Christopher Reeve.

Since that transition, Condic has published extensively in the field of bioethics, including two books on the intricacies of fetal development and how this biological knowledge intersects with philosophical understandings of human beings, "Human Embryos, Human Beings: A Scientific and Philosophical Approach" (2018) and "Untangling Twinning: What Science Tells Us about the Nature of Human Embryos" (2020).

== Government service ==
Condic was appointed to the National Science Board to help advise the US Government's senior leaders on bioethics matters. Her term runs 2018–2024. She wrote an Affidavit in 2012 with expert testimony intended to inform the Oklahoma legislature on embryonic development and personhood. In 2013, she testified before Congress regarding ethics surrounding a bill to ban abortions past a certain timeframe.

On July 29, 2021, Condic submitted an amicus brief to the United States Supreme Court in the case of Dobbs v. Jackson Women's Health which overturned the Court's previous ruling in Roe v. Wade.

Therein Condic summarizes her perspective on biomedical advances published in scientific journals that have increased biological understanding of human fetal development. However, many of her cited sources are misrepresented. For instance, citing a 2015 study by Lutkenhoff and colleagues, Condic writes that "the largest study to date of human patients with consciousness disorders unambiguously concluded that the loss of consciousness is associated not with the loss of cortical, but rather of subcortical circuitry." This would appear to suggest that consciousness might arise early in gestation even before the cerebral cortex has developed if, for instance, anatomical brain structures situated below the cortex, such as the thalamus, are actually responsible for consciousness. However, this interpretation is contradicted by the very study it cites, in which Lutkenhoff and colleagues endorse the view of an earlier study that the thalamus "might itself be neither necessary nor sufficient to produce wakefulness." The cerebral cortex appears to rely on nerve fibers that project from the thalamus, thus consciousness may be lost when the thalamus is injured, yet this does not demonstrate that consciousness can be sustained by the thalamus alone. Furthermore, the fact that the cortex relies on the thalamus to function is evidence that consciousness cannot plausibly emerge prior to 24 weeks gestation when connections form between the thalamus and cortex.

Condic states in her amicus that "...technological breakthroughs, especially sophisticated brain mapping and 4D ultrasonography, have enabled direct, unprecedented observation of human fetuses and behavior indicating their subjective experiences— confirming that the fetus is living, conscious, and sensitive to pain shortly after the beginning of the second trimester and months before viability." She argues that many of the scientific "uncertainties" that were present when Roe was decided five decades ago have subsequently been clarified by scientific advances. However, these advances in neuroscience do not corroborate her view that fetuses are conscious prior to viability. For instance, a 2021 study of fetal MEG signals found that a signature of conscious processing was not present until 35 weeks gestation, i.e., during the third trimester when the fetus is already viable.

== Awards ==
- 2019 - St. Albert Award
- 2015 - Pontifical Academy for Life appointment, an advisory board at the Vatican
- 2002 - McKnight Neuroscience of Brain Disorders Investigator
- 1999 - Basil O'Connor Young Investigator Award
