= Carlo Bergonzi (tenor) =

Italian tenor

- Bergonzi in front of Carnegie Hall in New York, 1994
- Born: 13 July 1924; Polesine Parmense, Italy
- Died: 25 July 2014 (aged 90); Milan, Italy
- Occupation: Opera singer
- Years active: 1948–2000
- Spouse: Adele Aimi (m. 1950–2014)
- Children: 2

Carlo Bergonzi (13 July 1924 – 25 July 2014) was an Italian operatic tenor. Although he performed and recorded some bel canto and verismo roles, he was above all associated with the operas of Giuseppe Verdi, including many of the composer's lesser known works he helped revive. He sang more than forty other roles throughout his career.

== Biography ==
=== Early life ===
Bergonzi was born in Polesine Parmense, near Parma in Northern Italy, on 13 July 1924. He was an only child. He later claimed he saw his first opera, Verdi's Il trovatore, when he was six years old. He sang in church, and soon he began to appear in children's opera roles in Busseto, a nearby town. After he left school at age 11 he began working in a parmesan cheese factory. His father worked there too, and Carlo often got into trouble for singing.

At the age of 16, he began his vocal studies as a baritone at Arrigo Boito Conservatory in Parma with Ettore Campogalliani and Edmondo Grandini.

During World War II, Bergonzi became involved in anti-Nazi activities and was interned in a German prisoner-of-war camp in 1943. Two years later, he was freed by the Russians and walked 106 km in order to reach an American camp. However, while on his way, he drank unboiled water and contracted typhoid fever, from which he recovered within a year. After the war he returned to the Arrigo Boito Conservatory in Parma, weighing just over 36 kilograms (80 pounds).

=== Operatic career ===
In a 1985 interview with Opera Fanatic's Stefan Zucker, Bergonzi cited 1948 as the year of his professional debut, as a baritone. He sang the role of Figaro in Rossini's The Barber of Seville, which he performed with a former prisoners' association which he joined after the war. It has been noted that the fee of 2,000 lire paid for his professional debut was insufficient to cover his meals and travel.

Other baritone roles which he undertook included those of Metifio in L'arlesiana, Doctor Malatesta in Don Pasquale, Belcore in L'elisir d'amore, Enrico Ashton in Lucia di Lammermoor, Ghirlino in Le astuzie di Bertoldo, Silvio in Pagliacci, David in L'amico Fritz, Alfio in Cavalleria rusticana, Albert in Werther, Marcello in La bohème, Sonora in La fanciulla del West, Sharpless in Madama Butterfly, Lescaut in Manon Lescaut, Laerte in Mignon, the title role in Rigoletto, and Georgio Germont in La traviata.

However, he realized that the tenor repertoire was more suited to his voice, and after retraining, he made his debut as a tenor in the title role of Andrea Chénier at the Teatro Petruzzelli in Bari in 1951. That same year, Bergonzi sang at the Colosseum in Rome in a 50th anniversary concert of Verdi's death and the Italian state radio network RAI engaged Bergonzi for a series of broadcasts of the lesser-known Verdi operas for the same purpose. These included I due Foscari as well as Giovanna d'Arco and Simon Boccanegra.

In 1953, Bergonzi made his La Scala debut, creating the title role in Jacopo Napoli's opera Mas' Aniello which was based on the life of Tommaso Aniello, the 17th-century Italian fisherman-turned-revolutionary. His London debut as Alvaro in La forza del destino took place at the Stoll Theatre in 1953. His American debut was at the Lyric Opera of Chicago in 1955, and his Metropolitan Opera debut as Radamès in Aida came on 13 November 1956 when he (and Antonietta Stella) received a positive reaction from Howard Taubman in The New York Times. Bergonzi continued to sing at the Met for 32 years, his last performance there occurring on 12 November 1988 in the role of Edgardo in Donizetti's Lucia di Lammermoor.

He sang the role of Radames again for his debut with the Philadelphia Lyric Opera Company in 1961 and in 1962 he reprised the role of Alvaro for his debut with the Royal Opera, Covent Garden. He made his debut with the San Francisco Opera in 1969 as Don Alvaro in La forza del destino.

Bergonzi pursued a busy international career in the opera house and recording studio during the 1960s. His chief Italian tenor rivals in this period were Franco Corelli and Mario Del Monaco. Bergonzi outlasted both, continuing to sing through the 1970s at major opera houses. But in the 1980s, as his own vocal quality deteriorated inevitably with age, he concentrated on recital work. In 1996, Bergonzi participated in conductor James Levine's 25th anniversary gala at the Metropolitan Opera. He gave his American farewell concert at Carnegie Hall on 17 April that same year.

However, an announcement that on 3 May 2000, he was to sing the title role in a concert performance of Verdi's Otello, conducted by Eve Queler and the Opera Orchestra of New York, attracted intense interest, particularly because he had never performed the demanding role on stage. Amongst others, the audience included Anna Moffo, Licia Albanese, Sherrill Milnes, José Carreras, Plácido Domingo and Luciano Pavarotti. Bergonzi was unable to finish the performance, supposedly suffering irritation from the air-conditioning in his dressing room. He withdrew after two acts, leaving the remaining two to be sung by Antonio Barasorda, a substitute singer. This performance was by wide critical consensus seen as a disaster.

After retiring, Bergonzi is credited with mentoring tenors Roberto Aronica, Giuliano Ciannella, Berle Sanford Rosenberg, Vincenzo La Scola, Filippo Lo Giudice, Philip Webb, Giorgio Casciari, Paul Caragiulo, Lance Clinker, Fernando del Valle, Salvatore Licitra and Emmanuel Lawler. Soprano Frances Ginsberg was also one of his pupils.

Bergonzi left a legacy of many recordings of individual arias and complete operas, including works by Verdi, Puccini, Mascagni and Leoncavallo. However, of his early baritone roles, few of his audio recordings still exist.

=== Summary of his vocal attributes ===
In The New York Times obituary, Peter G. Davis, who reviewed a 1978 Carnegie Hall recital by Bergonzi in The Times is quoted as noting:

More than the sound of the voice, it is Mr. Bergonzi's way of using it that is so special. He is a natural singer in that everything he does seems right and inevitable—the artful phrasing, the coloristic variety, the perfectly positioned accents, the theatrical sense of well-proportioned climaxes, the honest emotional fervor. Best of all, Mr. Bergonzi obviously uses these effects artistically because he feels them rather than intellectualizes them—a rare instinctual gift, possibly the most precious one any musician can possess.

Alan Blyth, in his Gramophone survey of Bergonzi's greatest recordings, sums up the qualities of Bergonzi's voice:

His singing there [referring to an online example], even more his earlier Verdi discs, evinces an innate feeling for shaping a line on a long breath, an exemplary clarity of diction, words placed immaculately on the tone, an authoritative use of portamento and acuti. Add to those virtues the manner by which he gives to each phrase a sense of inevitability and you say to yourself, in a mood of sheer pleasure, this is exactly how the music ought to sound. In the theatre only Otello was beyond his capabilities, though his solos are movingly sung on the Philips set.

=== Personal life ===
In 1950 Bergonzi married Adele Aimi, with whom he had two sons, Maurizio and Marco; the former was born on the day Bergonzi made his tenor debut. Bergonzi owned homes in both Milan and Busseto, in addition to a restaurant and hotel in the latter, the "I Due Foscari", named after the Verdi opera about Venetian court intrigue.

=== Death ===
Bergonzi died on 25 July 2014, twelve days after his 90th birthday, in the Auxologico Institution in Milan. He was buried in the Vidalenzo Cemetery.

== Repertoire as tenor ==
- Andrea Chénier. Bari, Teatro Petruzzelli, 18 January 1951
- Giovanna d'Arco. Milan, RAI, 26 May 1951
- Pagliacci. Milan, RAI, 10 June 1951
- La forza del destino. Milan, RAI, 16 July 1951
- Un ballo in maschera. Milan, Teatro Nuovo, 15 August 1951
- Simon Boccanegra. Rome, RAI, 21 November 1951
- I due Foscari. Milan, RAI, 5 December 1951
- Adriana Lecouvreur. Prato, Teatro Metastasio, 31 December 1951
- Faust. Bari, Teatro Petruzzelli, 8 January 1952
- Jenůfa (Steva). Rome, Teatro dell'Opera, 17 April 1952
- Ifigenia (by Pizzetti). Naples, San Carlo, 1 June 1952
- Mefistofele. Rome, Baths of Caracalla, 1 July 1952
- Madama Butterfly. Cagliari, August 1952
- Mas' Aniello. Milan, La Scala, 25 March 1953
- Rigoletto. Livorno, Teatro Goldoni, 20 May 1953
- Aida. Buenos Aires, Colón, 24 July 1953
- Tosca. Buenos Aires, Colón, 7 August 1953
- Manon Lescaut. Rovigo, Teatro Sociale, 24 October 1953
- Turandot. Catania, Massimo Teatro Bellini, 19 November 1953
- Loreley. Reggio Emilia, Teatro Municipale, 2 February 1954
- L'incoronazione di Poppea. Milan, RAI, 7 March 1954
- Carmen. Monte Carlo, Salle Garnier, 30 January 1955
- Lucia di Lammermoor. Brescia, Teatro Grande, 3 February 1955
- Don Carlos. Buenos Aires, Teatro Colón, August 1955
- La traviata. Salsomaggiore, Teatro Nuovo, 10 September 1955
- Il tabarro. Chicago, Lyric, 16 November 1955
- Cavalleria rusticana. Chicago, Lyric, 26 November 1955
- L'amore dei tre re. Chicago, Lyric, 28 November 1955
- La Gioconda. Trieste, Castello di San Giusto, 16 July 1956
- Il trovatore. New York, MET, 13 November 1956
- Fior di Maria. Milan, RAI, 30 January 1957
- La bohème. Caracas, Teatro Municipal, October 1957
- Macbeth. New York, MET, 5 February 1959
- L'elisir d'amore. San Sebastian, Victoria Eugenia, 26 August 1959
- Ernani. New York, MET, 26 November 1962
- La Wally. New York, Carnegie Hall, 13 March 1968
- Werther. Naples, Teatro San Carlo, 11 February 1969
- Aida. Parma, Teatro Regio, date unk.
- La forza del destino. Parma, Teatro Regio, date unk.
- Norma. New York, MET, 3 March 1970
- Luisa Miller. Genoa, Teatro Margherita, 20 September 1972
- Edgar. New York, Carnegie Hall, 13 April 1977
- I Lombardi alla prima crociata. San Diego, Russ Auditorium, 22 June 1979
- Il corsaro. New York, Town Hall, 16 December 1981
- Attila. Tulsa, Chapman Music Hall, 6 March 1982
- Oberto. Munich, Bavarian Radio Recording Studio, 4–12 March 1983
- Otello - acts 1 and 2. New York, Carnegie Hall, 3 May 2000

== Videography ==
- James Levine's 25th Anniversary Metropolitan Opera Gala (1996), Deutsche Grammophon DVD, B0004602-09

== Honour ==
- Italy: Knight Grand Cross of the Order of Merit of the Italian Republic (11 January 2011)
