= Society of Catholic Scientists =

International organization founded in 2016

- Abbreviation: SCS
- Formation: June 2016; 10 years ago
- Type: Professional lay organization 501(c)(3) organization
- Headquarters: 240D Geddes Hall, Notre Dame, IN, United States, 46556
- President: Stephen Barr
- Website: catholicscientists.org

The Society of Catholic Scientists (SCS) is an international organization of Catholic scientists formed to promote fellowship among Catholic scientists. Founded in 2016, it promotes the practice of the Gold Mass.

== Background ==
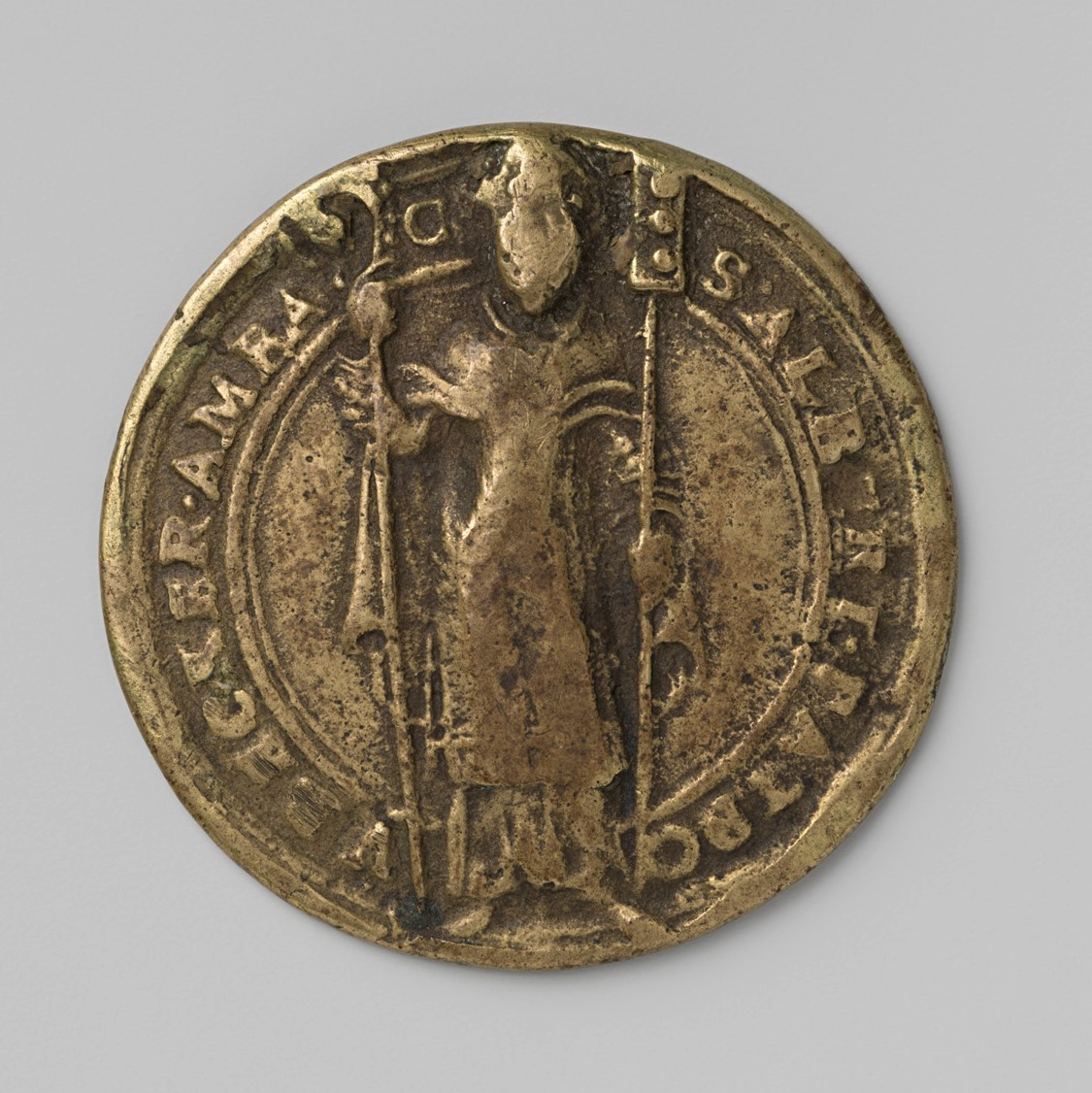
Albert the Great, patron of the Society of Catholic Scientists

The society was formed in June 2016 by a group of six scientists, including Stephen Barr, a physicist at the University of Delaware, who is its first president. The organization is primarily composed of scientists who hold or are studying for terminal degrees in their subject areas, who generally are or have been involved in scientific research. The Board of the SCS includes scientists Stephen M. Barr, Jonathan I. Lunine, Robert J. Scherrer, Stephen C. Meredith, Karin I. Öberg, Nicanor Austriaco, O.P., Maureen L. Condic and Christopher Baglow. The Episcopal Moderator of the SCS is Bishop Kevin C. Rhoades of South Bend. Prominent members of the Society of Catholic Scientists include Kenneth R. Miller and Brother Guy Consolmagno, current director of the Vatican Observatory.

The Society of Catholic Scientists is interested in providing fellowship for Catholic scientists and in providing information about Catholic scientists throughout history. Focusing on the "significance of scientific theories and discoveries and on the relation of science and faith, the organization is active at many North American research institutions, including Seton Hall, MIT, Notre Dame and the University of British Columbia.

Its first conference had the theme "Origins" and was held in April 2017 at the Millennium Knickerbocker Hotel in Chicago. The second conference had the theme "The Human Mind and Physicalism" and was held in June 2018 at the Catholic University of America in Washington D.C. The third conference had the theme “What does it mean to be human?” and was held at the University of Notre Dame. The fourth conference had the theme of "Extraterrestrials, AI, and Minds Beyond the Human" and was held in Washington D. C. in June 2021.

The society aims to show the harmony between faith and science. The Society of Catholic Scientists also promotes the practice of the Gold Mass, following the tradition of Red Masses for lawyers and the more modern usage of White Masses for those in health care and Blue Masses for law enforcement professionals.

== See also ==
- List of Catholic clergy scientists
- List of lay Catholic scientists
