= Sister Celine's polynomials =

Family of hypergeometric polynomials

In mathematics, Sister Celine's polynomials are a family of hypergeometric polynomials introduced by Mary Celine Fasenmyer in 1947. They include Legendre polynomials, Jacobi polynomials and Bateman polynomials as special cases.
