= Adhémar Barré de Saint-Venant =

French mathematician (1797–1886)

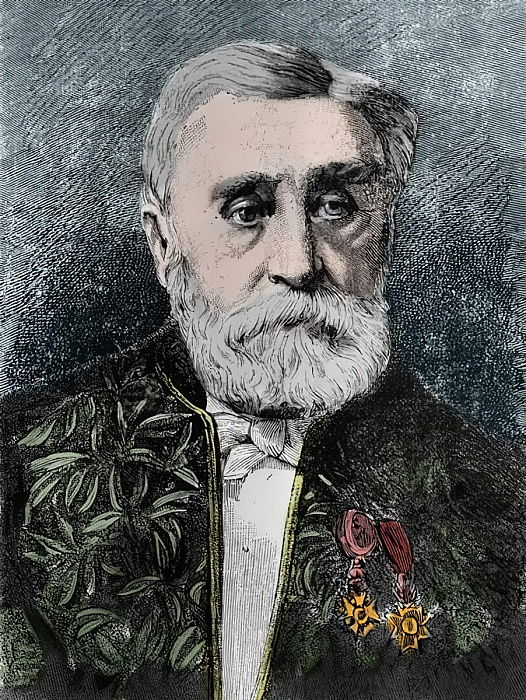
- Born: Adhémar Jean Claude Barré de Saint-Venant; 23 August 1797; Villiers-en-Bière, Seine-et-Marne France
- Died: 6 January 1886 (aged 88); Saint-Ouen, Loir-et-Cher, France
- Known for: Saint-Venant equations Saint-Venant's compatibility condition Saint-Venant's principle Saint-Venant's theorem Saint Venant–Kirchhoff model
- Scientific career
- Fields: Mathematics

Adhémar Jean Claude Barré de Saint-Venant (French pronunciation: [ademaʁ ʒɑ̃ klod baʁe də sɛ̃ vənɑ̃]; 23 August 1797 – 6 January 1886) was a mechanician and mathematician who contributed to early stress analysis and also developed the unsteady open channel flow shallow water equations, also known as the Saint-Venant equations that are a fundamental set of equations used in modern hydraulic engineering. The one-dimensional Saint-Venant equation is a commonly used simplification of the shallow water equations. Although his full surname was Barré de Saint-Venant, in mathematical literature other than French he is known as Saint-Venant. His name is also associated with Saint-Venant's principle of statically equivalent systems of load, Saint-Venant's theorem and for Saint-Venant's compatibility condition, the integrability conditions for a symmetric tensor field to be a strain.

In 1843 he published the correct derivation of the Navier–Stokes equations for a viscous flow and was the first to "properly identify the coefficient of viscosity and its role as a multiplying factor for the velocity gradients in the flow". Even though he published before Stokes, the equations do not bear his name.

Barré de Saint-Venant developed a version of vector calculus similar to that of Grassmann (now understood as exterior differential forms) which he published in 1845. A dispute arose between Saint-Venant and Grassmann over priority for this invention. Grassmann had published his results in 1844, but Barré de Saint-Venant claimed he had developed the method in 1832.

Barré de Saint-Venant was born at the château de Fortoiseau, Villiers-en-Bière, Seine-et-Marne, France. His mother was Marie-Thérèse Josèphe Laborie (born Saint-Domingue, 1769). His father was Jean Barré de Saint-Venant, (1737–1810), a colonial officer of the Isle of Saint-Domingue (later Haiti). Barré de Saint-Venant would follow in his father's footsteps in science, entering the École Polytechnique, in 1813 at sixteen years old, and studying under Gay-Lussac. Graduating in 1816 he worked for the next 27 years as an engineer, initially his passion for chemistry led him to a post as a élève-commissaire (candidate commissioner) for the Service des Poudres et Salpêtres (Powders and Saltpeter Service) and then as a civil engineer for the Corps des Ponts et Chaussées. He married in 1837, Rohaut Fleury from Paris. Following a disagreement on the issue of a certain road with the Municipal Administration of Paris, he was suddenly retired as "Chief Engineer, second class", on 1 April 1848. In 1850 Saint-Venant won a contest to be appointed the chair of Agricultural Engineering at the Agronomic Institute of Versailles, a post he occupied for two years.

He went on to teach mathematics at the École des Ponts et Chaussées (National school of Civil Engineering) where he succeeded Coriolis.

In 1868, at 71 years old, he was elected to succeed Poncelet in the mechanics section of the Académie des Sciences, and continued research work for a further 18 years. He died in January 1886 at Saint-Ouen, Loir-et-Cher. Sources differ on his date of death: gives 6 January whereas 22 January. In 1869 he was given the title 'Count' (comte) by Pope Pius IX.
