= Mary Celine Fasenmyer =

American mathematician (1906–1996)

Mary Celine Fasenmyer, RSM (October 4, 1906, Crown, Pennsylvania – December 27, 1996, Erie, Pennsylvania) was an American mathematician and Catholic religious sister. She is most noted for her work on hypergeometric functions and linear algebra.

== Biography ==
Fasenmyer grew up in Pennsylvania's oil country, and displayed mathematical talent in high school. For ten years after her graduation she taught and studied at Mercyhurst College in Erie, where she joined the Sisters of Mercy. She pursued her mathematical studies in Pittsburgh and the University of Michigan, obtaining her doctorate in 1946 under the direction of Earl Rainville, with a dissertation entitled Some Generalized Hypergeometric Polynomials.

After earning her Ph.D., Fasenmyer published two papers which expanded on her doctorate work. These would be further elaborated by Doron Zeilberger and Herbert Wilf into "WZ theory", which allowed computerized proof of many combinatorial identities. After this, she returned to Mercyhurst to teach and did not engage in further research.

Fasenmyer died in 1996.

== "Sister Celine's" method ==
Fasenmyer is most remembered for the method that bears her name, first described in her Ph.D. thesis concerning recurrence relations in hypergeometric series. The thesis demonstrated a purely algorithmic method to find recurrence relations satisfied by sums of terms of a hypergeometric polynomial, and requires only the series expansions of the polynomial. The beauty of her method is that it lends itself readily to computer automation. The work of Wilf and Zeilberger generalized the algorithm and established its correctness.

The hypergeometric polynomials she studied are called Sister Celine's polynomials.

== Publications ==
- Fasenmyer, Mary Celine (1947), "Some generalized hypergeometric polynomials", Bulletin of the American Mathematical Society, (1945 University of Michigan PhD thesis), 53 (8): 806–812, doi:10.1090/S0002-9904-1947-08893-5, ISSN 0002-9904, MR 0022276, Zbl 0032.15402
- Fasenmyer, Mary Celine (1949), "A note on pure recurrence relations", The American Mathematical Monthly, 56 (1): 14–17, doi:10.1080/00029890.1949.11990232, ISSN 0002-9890, JSTOR 2305810, MR 0030044, Zbl 0032.41002
