= Saint-Venant's theorem =

Theorem in solid mechanics

In solid mechanics, it is common to analyze the properties of beams with constant cross section. Saint-Venant's theorem states that the simply connected cross section with maximal torsional rigidity is a circle. It is named after the French mathematician Adhémar Jean Claude Barré de Saint-Venant.

Given a simply connected domain D in the plane with area A, $\rho$ the radius of its greatest inscribed circle, the torsional rigidity P of D is defined by

$$P= 4\sup_f \frac{\left( \iint\limits_D f\, dx\, dy\right)^2}{\iint\limits_D {f_x}^2+{f_y}^2\, dx\, dy}.$$

Here the supremum is taken over all the continuously differentiable functions vanishing on the boundary of D. The existence of this supremum is a consequence of Poincaré inequality.

Saint-Venant conjectured in 1856 that of all domains D of equal area A the circular one has the greatest torsional rigidity, that is

$$P \le P_{\text{circle}} \le \frac{A^2}{2 \pi}.$$

A rigorous proof of this inequality was not given until 1948 by Pólya. Another proof was given by Davenport and reported in. A more general proof and an estimate

$$P< 4 \rho^2 A$$

is given by Makai.
