= Saint-Venant's principle =

Engineering statement about elasticity

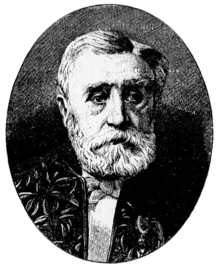
Adhémar Jean Claude Barré de Saint-Venant

Saint-Venant's principle, named after Adhémar Jean Claude Barré de Saint-Venant, a French elasticity theorist, may be expressed as follows:

... the difference between the effects of two different but statically equivalent loads becomes very small at sufficiently large distances from load.

The original statement was published in French by Saint-Venant in 1855. Although this informal statement of the principle is well known among structural and mechanical engineers, more recent mathematical literature gives a rigorous interpretation in the context of partial differential equations. An early such interpretation was made by Richard von Mises in 1945.

The Saint-Venant's principle allows elasticians to replace complicated stress distributions or weak boundary conditions with ones that are easier to solve, as long as that boundary is geometrically short. Quite analogous to the electrostatics, where the product of the distance and electric field due to the i-th moment of the load (with 0th being the net charge, 1st the dipole, 2nd the quadrupole) decays as $1/r^{2-i}$ over space, Saint-Venant's principle states that high order moment of mechanical load (moment with order higher than torque) decays so fast that they never need to be considered for regions far from the short boundary. Therefore, the Saint-Venant's principle can be regarded as a statement on the asymptotic behavior of the Green's function by a point-load.

== See also ==
- Shallow water equations
