= Polesine Parmense =

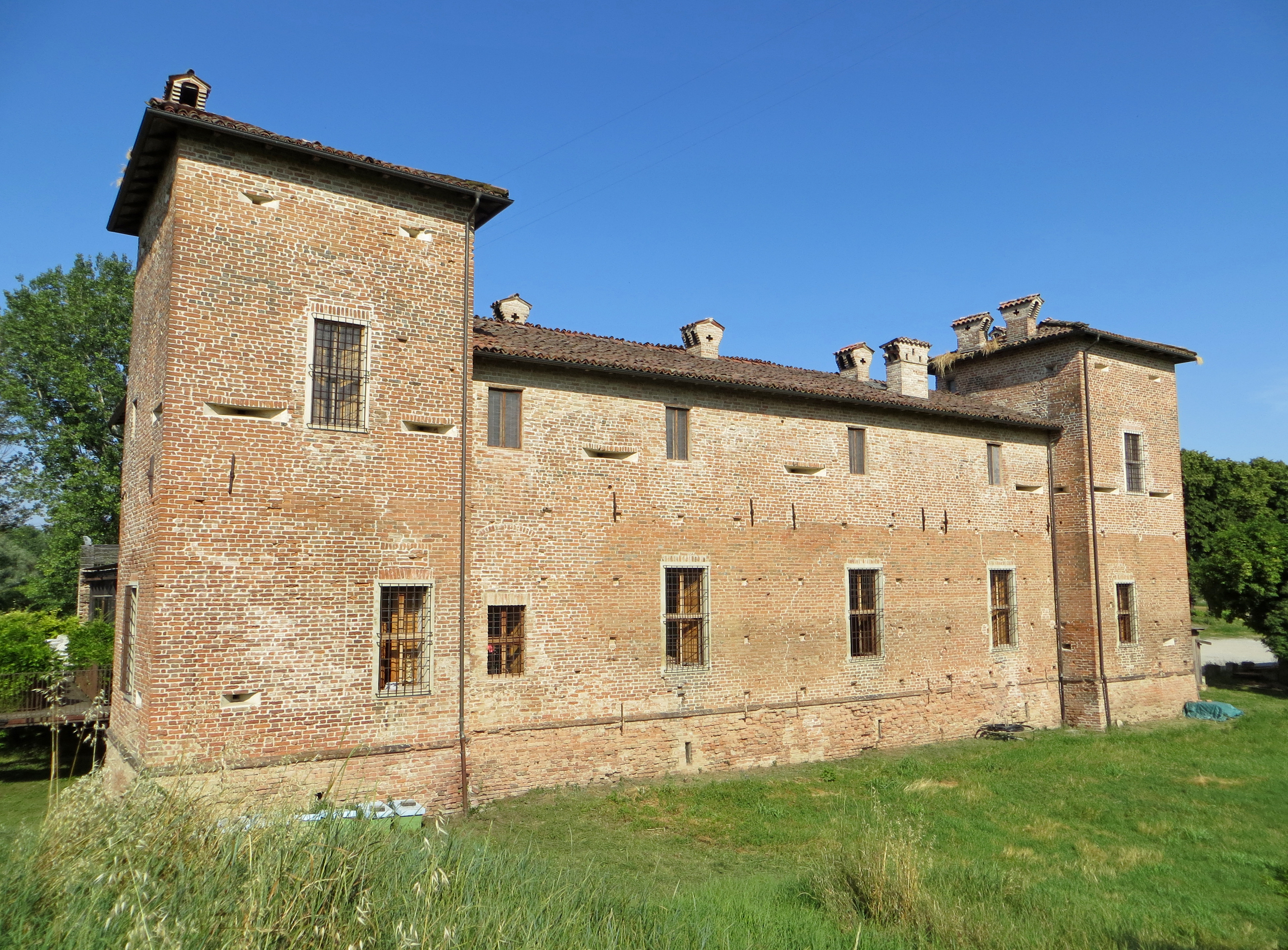
Corte Pallavicina in Polesine Parmense.

Polesine Parmense is a town in the Italian region Emilia-Romagna, located about 120 kilometres (75 mi) northwest of Bologna and about 30 kilometres (19 mi) northwest of Parma. It was an independent comune until 1 January 2016, when it merged with Zibello to form the new comune of Polesine Zibello.

== Famous Residents ==
Carlo Bergonzi (tenor) was born in Polesine Parmense in 1924.
