= Giancarlo Rastelli =

Italian cardiac surgeon (1933–1970)

Servant of God Giancarlo Rastelli
- Born: 25 June 1933; Pescara, Italy
- Died: 2 February 1970 (aged 36); Rochester, Minnesota, U.S.
- Education: University of Parma
- Known for: Creator of the Rastelli procedure
- Spouse: Anna Anghileri (m. 1964)
- Medical career
- Profession: Cardiac Surgeon
- Institutions: University of Parma; Institute of Human Anatomy; Institute of General Pathology; Institute of Clinical Surgery; Mayo Clinic
- Awards: Lepetit Prize (1957)

Giancarlo Rastelli (25 June 1933 – 2 February 1970) was an Italian-born cardiac surgeon who worked for the University of Parma and the Mayo Clinic. He was the creator of the Rastelli procedure. He died of cancer at 36 years of age. At the time of his death, he was the head of cardiovascular surgical research at the Mayo Clinic in Rochester, Minnesota. Rastelli is considered a servant of God by the Catholic Church and the beatification process for him was initiated in 2005.

== Biography ==
=== Childhood and private life ===
Rastelli was born in Pescara on 25 June 1933. His father, Vito Rastelli, was a journalist; his mother, Bianchi Luisa, was a primary school teacher. He had a younger sister, Rosangela, who would be an English teacher and social worker. He was interested in medicine from a young age. Rastelli met with the Gesuit Padre Molin Mosè when he was 12 years old. On 10 August 1964, he married Anna Anghileri of Sondrio, who had met while skiing in Bormio. In 1965 his daughter Antonella Rastelli was born; she is now a doctor.

=== Entrance into medicine ===
He attended the University of Parma and started going to the hospital during his third year; he graduated cum laude in medicine and surgery in 1957, and immediately started working for free in the surgical clinic of Parma. In 1958, he obtained medical licence with full marks; then he was an intern at the Hospital of Parma up to 1961.

=== American period ===
On 7 September 1961, Rastelli won a NATO scholarship at the Mayo Clinic in Rochester, Minnesota. There he learnt cardiology with a brand-new approach due to the teachings of Jeremy Swan and John W. Kirklin. His two surgical techniques, Rastelli 1 and Rastelli 2, have been fundamental in the classification of both truncus arteriosus and transposition of the great vessels. He never left Italy, and paid for children's travel and hosted them in his house near the Clinic; sometimes to save money he used to season salad with hard-boiled eggs (a low price source of proteins). The next years saw children coming from Parma – and other countries – to Rochester in order to be assisted. The first child to be operated by Rastelli was a four-year-old boy named Paolo Ravesi, who was affected by atrioventricular canal (partial type) and who had undergone surgery in Italy without success. In 1968 Rastelli operated on his second patient, the son of one of his colleagues in Parma, Pietro Maniscalco; since birth he had suffered from coarctation of the aorta, a condition thought to be inoperable in Italy. He had been diagnosed with Hodgkin lymphoma in 1964, and as he grew sicker, he had to trust his colleagues to perform more of the care for his patients. He developed a new surgical approach named to the repair of transposition of the great vessels, also known as the Rastelli 1 procedure. On 19 December 1969, Paolo Frugoni, a six-year-old boy with TGV, came to Mayo Clinic in search of medical assistance. Despite his poor health, Rastelli wanted to assist the surgeon at all costs during the surgery; the operation was a success and this was to be the last one at which Rastelli assisted before his death three weeks afterward. Children and their families would cross the ocean to seek treatment by him; he used to visit children for free in Italy and then he would make sure they could face the overseas journey at the Mayo Clinic.

== Rastelli techniques ==
Nowadays the name of Giancarlo Rastelli is still remembered and used very much in the field of cardiac surgery due to the impact of his important discoveries. Rastelli was the author of 100 scientific publications and he is still renowned for two surgical procedures named Rastelli 1 and Rastelli 2 and for the classification of a particular kind of heart disease.

=== Atrioventricular canal ===
Chronologically his first discovery was the anatomical description and classification of a particular kind of heart disease named atrioventricular canal. The atrioventricular canal represents 3-5% of heart diseases which originates from an embryological ventricular septal defect of the cardiac cavity. That lesion affects the crux cardis, a structure formed by the crossing of the atrial and ventricular septa and by the atrioventricular valves: tricuspid and mitral. This area has the same origin: it forms from endocardial cushions. In patients who are affected by the atrioventricular canal, which is caused by the non-fusion of the endocardial cushions, there is a communication between the right and left sides of the heart at the level of the atria and ventricles. In addition, the two atria are in communication with the two ventricles through a single common valve, instead of two distinct ones. In 1966, the magazine "Mayo Clinic Proceedings" has published the classification of the different forms: complete and incomplete, that the atrioventricular canal assumes. In the complete form there is the distinction of three subtypes of heart diseases: A,B or C according to the characteristics of the common anterior leaflet of the unique atrioventricular valve. In the incomplete form there is the distinction of two types with or without interventricular communication. The proposed classification has been granted from all over the world and from that moment, the different types of the A-V canal have been classified according to the Rastelli's classification.

=== Rastelli operation ===
The truncus arteriosus is a type of congenital heart disease which was object of study by Rastelli. It is characterized by a lack of formation of the two main vessels that normally bring blood from the heart to the lungs and to the rest of the body. Due to embryological defects, in patients affected, a unique vessel carries the blood either to the lungs either to the other organs and tissues. The innovation of Rastelli's group consisted in improving an already pre-existent surgical technique by introducing extracardiac conduct from the right ventricle to the pulmonary artery. The technique evolved into an operation applicable to a great variety of cardiac anomalies including those children born with transposition of the great arteries, ventricular septal defect, and pulmonary stenosis.

== Illness and death ==
In September 1964, Rastelli underwent clinical examinations, a routine for the researchers of the Mayo Clinic. He was diagnosed with lung cancer and given six months to live. After the chest biopsy surgery, he was diagnosed with Hodgkin's disease. At that time, the first chemotherapy was being tested at the Mayo Clinic. The disease had been shown to have a five-year course with chemotherapy. In December 1969, after five years from the start of chemotherapy, the disease seemed to have disappeared. Unfortunately, just fifteen days later a large lymph node was detected in the liver. He decided to set off, accompanied by his wife, unaware of his last condition, for a trip to New York. Back in Rochester, his searches became frantic; he was conscious of the short time he still had available. On 29 January, Rastelli had to illustrate the third Rastelli method to his team. However, his condition suddenly worsened and he did not show up for the meeting: in this way his third method will not be revealed. He was hospitalized and intubated. On 2 February 1970, Rastelli died.

At the end of 1980 the Gesuit Padre Mario Castelli from Parma got interested in the figure of Giancarlo and suggested him for beatification, with the aim of bringing him as an example for young Catholics, young students, researchers and doctors. The journey of canonization was very long and difficult also because of the death of padre Mario Castelli a few years later. It was only in 2000 that Andrea Maggiali proposed again the cause of beatification of Rastelli. The beatification process is currently in a waiting and prayer period. This is the prayer composed by the Bishop of Parma Mons. Solmi for the cause of beatification of Giancarlo Rastelli:

A prayer composed by the Bishop of Parma for Rastelli’s cause of beatification highlights his example as a physician and servant of God, and asks for spiritual support and healing for those facing illness.

== Recognition ==
- Recipient of a NATO scholarship
- Recipient of a golden medal from Carlo ERBA Foundation after winning the prize "Missione del medico"
- Appointment to be member of the National Institute of Health

== Eponyms ==
In May 1978 a School in Polesine Parmense was entitled "Giancarlo Rastelli". The Municipality of Parma entitled a street "Giancarlo Rastelli" near the place where the Rastelli's lived. In September 2013 was inaugurated the "Casa della Salute" at Polesine Parmense and it was given the name of Giancarlo Rastelli in Polesine Parmense.

== Bibliography ==
- Anonymus, santiebeati.it. servo di Dio, Giancarlo Rastelli. 14 agosto 2007
- Anonymous, paolosestoparma.it. "Rastelli's biography" (PDF).
- John W. Kirklin M.D, Dwight C. McGoon M.D, Patrick A. Ongley M.D, G.C. Rastelli M.D. "Surgical repair of the complete form of persistent common atrioventricular canal". The Journal of Thoracic and Cardiovascular Surgery. 55 (3): 299–308. (March 1968) doi:10.1016/s0022-5223(19)42953-x. ISSN 0022-5223.
- Anna Leonardi, it.clone.org. Rastelli. Il grande cuore del dottor Gian. 13 settembre 2018.
- G. V. Lo Russo, G. Lucertini, A. Pace, V. Sandroni. La prima carità al malato è la scienza- Giancarlo Rastelli, un cardiochirurgo appassionato all'uomo, Itaca (Castel Bolognese), 2017, ISBN 88-526-0536-3.
- Pier Andrea Maccarini. Giancarlo Rastelli, un celebre cardiochirurgo e un santo sconosciuto, Giornale Italiano di Cardiologia, Novembre 2006, Vol. 7, N. 11: 768–769, doi:10.1714/703.8064.
- Dwight C, McGoon,. "An Operation for the Correction of Truncus Arteriosus". JAMA: The Journal of the American Medical Association. 205 (2): 69. (8 July 1968) doi:10.1001/jama.1968.03140280023007. ISSN 0098-7484.
- Rastelli Zavattaro, Rosangela. Giancarlo Rastelli : un cardiochirurgo con la passione dell'uomo,. Milano: Àncora, 2003, ISBN 88-514-0124-1.
- G. V. Lo Russo, G. Lucertini, A. Pace, V. Sandroni, A. Rastelli. Science is an act of Love. Giancarlo Rastelli, a cardiac surgeon with a passion for mankind, Castel Bolognese: Itaca, 2020, ISBN 88-526-0631-9.
- https://history.mayoclinic.org/books-films/heritage-films/science-is-an-act-of-love-dr-giancarlo-rastelli-at-mayo-clinic.php
