= Rastelli procedure =

Open heart surgical procedure

- Specialty: Cardiology

The Rastelli procedure is an open heart surgical procedure developed by Italian physician and cardiac surgery researcher Giancarlo Rastelli, in 1967 at the Mayo Clinic, and involves using a pulmonary or aortic homograft conduit to relieve pulmonary obstruction in double outlet right ventricle with pulmonary stenosis.

On July 26, 1968, the first successful surgery was carried out at the Mayo Clinic by Dr. Robert Wallace.

== Usage ==
It is used to correct certain combinations of congenital heart defects (CHDs):

1. dextro-Transposition of the great arteries (d-TGA), or overriding aorta, or double outlet right ventricle (DORV); and
2. Ventricular septal defect (VSD); and
3. Right ventricular outflow tract obstruction (RVOTO):

- pulmonary atresia; or
- pulmonary stenosis; or
- subpulmonary stenosis.

== Timing ==
The Rastelli procedure is typically performed between one and two years of age. Since d-TGA, overriding aorta and DORV are cyanotic heart defects, the child is palliated with a Blalock–Thomas–Taussig shunt in the meantime.

== Surgical method ==
Oxygenated blood is directed from the left ventricle to the aorta using a Gore-Tex patch. The VSD is also sealed with the patch. The pulmonary valve is surgically closed.

From the right ventricle to the pulmonary bifurcation, a synthetic conduit and a valve are constructed, which lets oxygen depleted blood to flow into the lungs for reoxygenation.

== Results ==
In the last seven years of the study, there were seven early deaths (7%) and no surgical fatalities. Univariable analysis revealed that a straddling tricuspid valve (P =.04) and longer aortic crossclamping periods (P =.04) were risk factors for early mortality.

There were 17 late deaths and a patient who had undergone heart transplantation after an average follow-up of 8.5 years.

44 patients underwent reoperations for conduit stenosis, 11 for left ventricular outflow tract obstruction and 28 for interventional catheterization to alleviate conduit stenosis.

There were nine patients with late arrhythmias and five patients who experienced sudden deaths.

At 5, 10, 15 and 20 years, avoidance of death or transplantation (Kaplan-Meier) was 82 percent, 80 percent, 68 percent and 52 percent, respectively.

At 5, 10 and 15 years of followup, the rates of death or reintervention (catheterization or surgical therapy) were 53 percent, 24 percent and 21 percent, respectively.

== Conclusions ==
Overall, the Rastelli procedure has a low initial fatality rate.

Conduit blockage, left ventricular outflow tract obstruction and arrhythmia, on the other hand, are linked to significant late morbidity and mortality.

Almost half of the patients who received the Rastelli operation required heart transplantation or died two decades later.
