= Mundo De Cristo =

Dominican online magazine

- Website type: Media, Music, News, Publishing
- Available in: Spanish
- Owner: Luther Yonel
- Editor: Johanna Reinoso
- Website: www.mundodecristo.net
- Registration: None
- Launched: March 27, 2010; 16 years ago
- Current status: Active

Mundo De Cristo is an online Dominican magazine covering media, music, news, and Christian editorials. The website highlights Christian culture.

== History ==
Mundo De Cristo was created in 2010 by Luther Yonel, a fourteen-year-old missionary child born in the Dominican Republic. In 2014, they became one of the most visited religious pages at that time.

In 2015 they formed the team Equipo MDC.
