= Jerome A. Stone =

American philosopher, minister, and theologian (born 1935)

The Reverend Jerome A. Stone
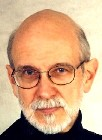
- Born: 1935 (age 90–91)
- Education: University of Chicago (Ph.D., 1973)
- Known for: History of religious naturalism
- Scientific career
- Fields: Theology, philosophy
- Institutions: Kendall College; William Rainey Harper College; Meadville Lombard Theological School

Jerome A. Stone (born 1935) is an American author, philosopher, Congregationalist minister, and theologian. He is best known for helping to develop the religious movement of religious naturalism. Stone is on the Adjunct Faculty of Meadville Lombard Theological School; is Emeritus Professor of Philosophy at William Rainey Harper College; is in Preliminary Fellowship with the Unitarian Universalist Association; and is a member of the Highlands Institute of American Religious and Philosophical Thought and the Institute on Religion in an Age of Science (IRAS).

== Biography ==
Stone grew up in Connecticut and Rhode Island, the son of a Protestant pastor. Though his family was of modest means he had access to a broad range of books. His father taught him respect for other religions early on. He was educated in the aesthetic and moral dimensions of church life. Instead of oppressive moralism, he was given a vision of moral integrity, service and a sense of the numinous.

At the age of sixteen he left home, an early entrant to the University of Chicago. After a year of graduate studies, he transferred to Andover Newton Theological School outside of Boston, MA. His M.Div. thesis was done there on Paul Tillich’s Concept of God as the Ground of Being. He then continued his graduate training at the University of Chicago Divinity School, completing his doctorate there in 1973. His doctorate thesis was done on The Secular Experiences OF Transcendence: The Contributions of Bernard Meland, H. Richard Niebuhr and Paul Tillich. During this time he served as pastor at three Congregational and United Church of Christ churches. He helped organize the Danville Council on Human Relations which is said to have become the seed bed for the first Head Start program to receive funding.

He went on to teach religion, philosophy, ethics and racism in America at Kendall College, William Rainey Harper College and later at the Meadville Theological School. Over these years he developed a strong environmentalism. In 2002, Stone wrote:

Lets get religious for a minute. What if the earth and its creatures were sacred? The sacred we treat with overriding care. What if the earth and our sibling creatures were sacred, either inherently sacred, or because they have a derivative sacredness as creatures of God... I would say that my enlightenment involves finding out that I am of the earth, earthly. The continuing task is to find out what this means and to live by it.

Stone has moved from liberal Protestantism through a flirtation with neo-orthodoxy to a more serious wrestling with Paul Tillich and finally to a Religious Naturalism shaped by Henry Nelson Wieman, Bernard Meland and John Dewey.

== Religious naturalism ==
Stone's Religious Naturalism Today: The Rebirth of a Forgotten Alternative, looks at the history and revival of Religious Naturalism, a 1940s option in religious thinking. It seeks to explore, develop and encourage spiritual ways of responding to the world on a completely naturalistic basis without a supreme supernatural being.

Stone traces its history and analyzes some of the issues dividing Religious Naturalists. He includes analysis of nearly fifty distinguished philosophers, theologians, scientists, and figures in art and literature, both living and dead. They range from Ursula Goodenough, Gordon D. Kaufman, William Dean, Thomas Berry and Gary Snyder to Jan Christiaan Smuts, William Bernhardt, Gregory Bateson and Sharon Welch. His history includes its birth from George Santayana to modern contributors such as Henry Nelson Wieman, Loyal Rue and Chet Raymo. He briefly explores Religious Naturalism in literature and art. Contested issues are discussed including whether Nature's power or goodness is the focus of attention and also on the appropriateness of using the term God. Mary Doak, author of Reclaiming Narrative for Public Theology says of it:

This is a timely contribution to contemporary theology. I know of no other book that provides such a clear yet nuanced account of the origins, development, and contemporary forms of religious naturalism. Stone's achievement ensures that religious naturalism will again be a major contender in theological debates

Stone's Sacred Nature: The Environmental Potential of Religious Naturalism, examines the crisis of environmental degradation through the prism of religious naturalism.

The individual perspectives on Religious Naturalism of Loyal Rue, Donald A. Crosby, Ursula Goodenough and Stone are discussed by Michael Hogue in his 2010 book The Promise of Religious Naturalism.

== Works ==
=== Major publications ===
- Sacred Nature: The Environmental Potential of Religious Naturalism, Routledge Press, June 2017.
- Religious Naturalism Today: The Rebirth of a Forgotten Alternative, State University of New York Press, December 2008
- The Chicago School of Theology, 2 Vols, The Edwin Mellen Press, 1996, co-edited and wrote Preface.
- The Minimalist Vision of Transcendence: A Naturalist Philosophy of Religion, SUNY Press, 1992.
- "Broadening Care, Discerning Worth: The Environmental Contributions of Minimalist Religious Naturalism". Process Studies. XXII: 194–203. Winter 1993. Archived from the original on 2 November 2011.

=== Major articles ===
- Stone, Jerome A. (2003). "Is Nature Enough? Yes". Zygon: Journal of Religion and Science. 38 (4): 783–800. doi:10.1111/j.1467-9744.2003.00539.x.
- Stone, Jerome A. (2004). "Philip Hefner and the Modernist/Postmodernist Divide". Zygon: Journal of Religion and Science. 39 (4): 755–772. doi:10.1111/j.1467-9744.2004.00617.x.
- Stone, Jerome A. (2004). "Power and Goodness of the Object of the Religious Attitude: Axiological Determinacy and Ambiguity in Recent Religious Naturalism". American Journal of Theology and Philosophy. 25 (3): 225–246.
- Stone, Jerome A. (2006). "Five Controversies in Early Religious Naturalism" (PDF). Journal of Liberal Religion. 7 (1). Archived from the original (PDF) on 4 March 2016.
