= Epic of evolution =

Mythological narrative inspired by evolution

In social, cultural, and religious studies in the United States, the "epic of evolution" is a narrative that blends religious and scientific views of cosmic, biological, and sociocultural evolution in a mythological manner. According to The Encyclopedia of Religion and Nature, an "epic of evolution" encompasses

the 14 billion year narrative of cosmic, planetary, life, and cultural evolution—told in sacred ways. Not only does it bridge mainstream science and a diversity of religious traditions; if skillfully told, it makes the science story memorable and deeply meaningful, while enriching one's religious faith or secular outlook.

== History ==
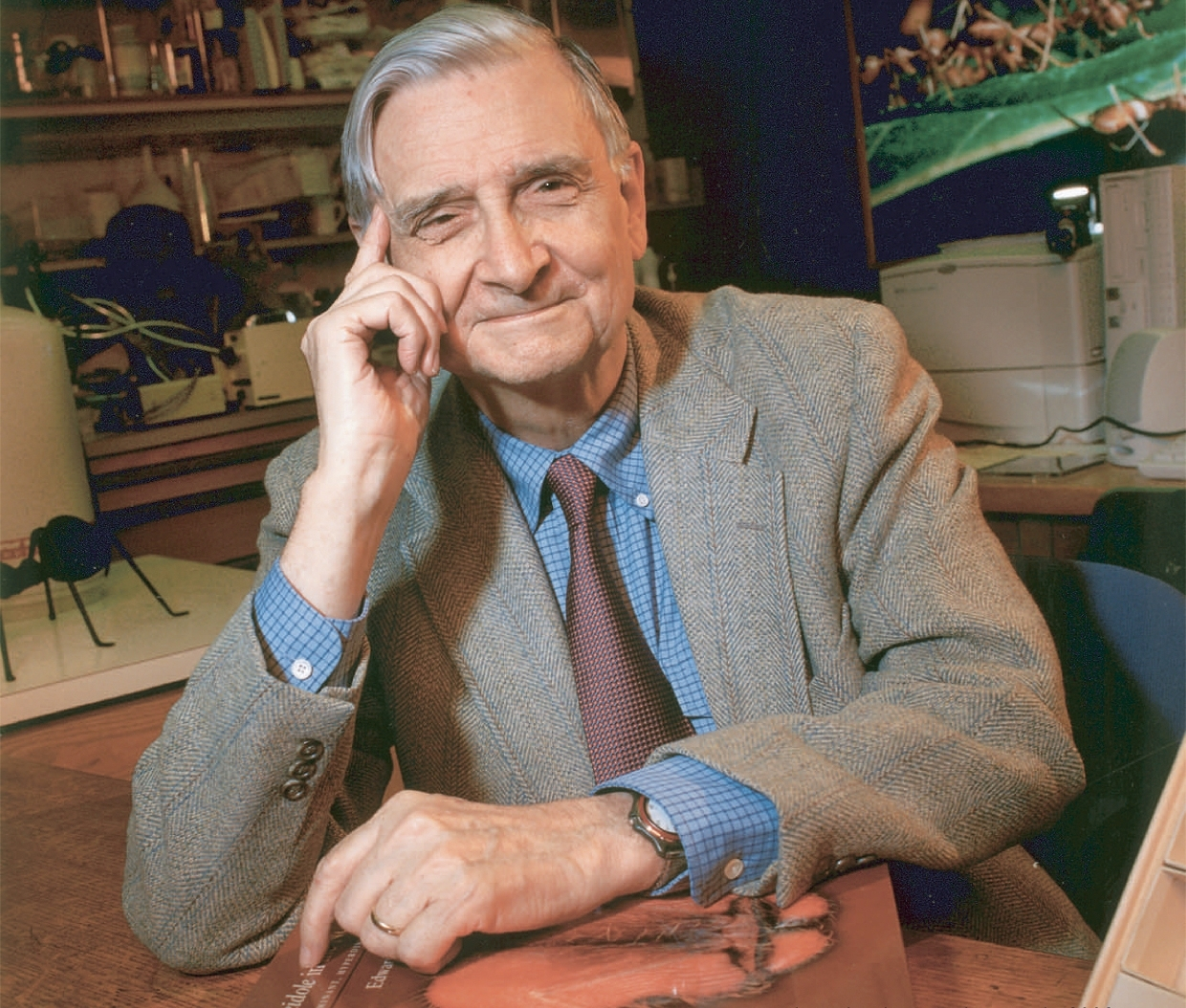
Edward O. Wilson coined the phrase "evolutionary epic" in 1978.

"Epic of evolution" seems to have originated from the sociobiologist Edward O. Wilson's use of the phrase "evolutionary epic" in 1978. Wilson was not the first to use the phrase, but, due to his prominence, the modified phrase 'epic of evolution,' became widespread. In later years, he, too, used the modified phrase.

Naturalistic and liberal religious writers have used the phrase in a number of texts. They have also used related phrases: Universe Story (Brian Swimme, John F. Haught), Great Story (Connie Barlow, Michael Dowd), Everybody's Story (Loyal Rue), New Story (Thomas Berry, Al Gore, Brian Swimme) and Cosmic Evolution (Eric Chaisson).

== Narrative ==
Evolution generally refers to biological evolution, but here it means a process in which the whole universe is a progression of interrelated phenomena, a gradual process in which something changes into a different and usually more complex form (emergence). It should not be "biologized" as it includes many areas of science. In addition, outside of the scientific community, the term evolution is frequently used differently from scientists' usage. This often leads to misunderstanding since scientists are viewing evolution from a different perspective. The same applies to the use of the term theory as used in the theory of evolution (see references for Evolution as theory and fact).

This epic is not a long narrative poem but a series of events that form the subject for a kind of tale. It is mythic in that it is a story of ostensibly historical events that serves to unfold part of the worldview of a people and explains a natural phenomenon. It is a form of myth that has an approach to investigation that is empirical or scientific. According to Joseph Campbell, myths serve two purposes—provide meaning for a maturing individual (an individuate) and how to be part of a community.

== The epic as myth ==
William Grassie of Temple University writes that the word "myth" in common usage is usually misunderstood. In academia it defines "a story that serves to define the fundamental world view of a culture by explaining aspects of the natural world and delineating the psychological and social practices and ideals of a society". He suggests that the Greek term mythos would be a better term to apply to the Epic as it is more all-encompassing. He concluded that there is not yet an interpretive tradition within science and society about this epic of evolution. If anything, there is an anti-interpretation tradition. Consequently, this is dangerous as it is a powerful revelation at this time. Grassie says the Epic is complex and multifaceted, not simple or easy to understand. It takes a romantic vision, philosophical rigor, and artistic interpretations. It requires a consilience of modern disciplines and acceptance of social diversity. The ancient wisdoms of the world's spiritual traditions must be adapted to make the framework to weave the Epic.

== Interpretations of the epic ==
E. O. Wilson wrote that humans had a need for the epic of evolution because they must have a mythical story or a sublime account of how the world was created and how humanity became part of it. He believes religious epics fulfill a primal need in this respect as they verify that humans are part of something greater than themselves. His position is that the best empirical knowledge that science and history can provide is necessary in order to provide a comparable epic tale that will reliably unite a separated human spirituality. He believes the evolutionary epic can be as inherently noble as any religious epic when it is expressed in a poetic way. In a similar vein, biologist Ursula Goodenough sees the tale of natural emergence as far more magical than traditional religious miracles. It is a story that people can work with in a religious way if they elect to do so.

Philip Hefner uses the analogy of weaving to describe the Epic. The warp anchors the story and the weft creates the pattern and the tapestry. The Epic, as scientists see it, is the warp and the weft forms the pattern as each of us views it (we are all weavers) but the patterns all have the warp in common. Hefner writes that stories about the evolutionary epic are redolent with ultimacy. It is not science; it is scientifically informed myth, a myth driven by the refusal to give up on the insistence that the natural world and our lives in the world have meaning and purpose. It is a mythical tale of irony and hope that fills a large space in the domain of religion-and-science. Biologist Ursula Goodenough also makes use of Hefner's weaving metaphor.

Connie Barlow and Michael Dowd's Great Story divides the epic into 8 phases eons or eras: the Great Radiance, the Galactic, Hadean, Archean, Proterozoic, Paleozoic, Mesozoic, and Cenozoic. Dowd uses the term 'epic of evolution' to help construct his viewpoint of evolution theology (a form of theistic evolution). His position is that science and religious faith are not mutually exclusive. He preaches that the epic of cosmic, biological, and human evolution, revealed by science, is a basis for an inspiring and meaningful view of our place in the universe. Evolution is viewed as a spiritual process that it is not chance. An entry by Barlow in Bron Taylor's The Encyclopedia of Religion and Nature gives four primary categories: cosmic, planetary, life, cultural.

Loyal Rue states that there is nothing in the core of everybody's story to rule out belief in a personal deity. He says belief in God is not an indispensable part of this narrative and here will be both theistic and non-theistic versions of it. He says it is the fundamental story of matter, created from energy, the organization of that matter into complex conditions, and then via self-organization into diverse life forms. Humans are as other living things—we are by nature star-born, earth-formed, fitness-maximized, biochemical systems. An aspect of the Epic is the evolution of behavior by that biochemical system.

Gordon D. Kaufman sees the Epic as a serendipitous creative process. He states that it is a notion that can interpret the enormous expansion and complexification of the physical universe (from the Big Bang outward), as well as the evolution of life here on earth and the gradual emergence of human historical existence. The whole vast process manifests (in varying degrees) serendipitous creativity, an everflowing coming into being of new modes of reality. In his book, In the beginning—creativity, he says this creative process is God. Creativity, as metaphor, and as defined in the concept of evolution, has possibilities for constructing a new concept of God. The most foundational kind of creativity is found in that of cosmos/biological evolution—a paradigm that is now the organizing principle of all the sciences. It would seem as though he was equating God to the evolutionary story. This is similar to Dowd who sees the facts of Nature as God's native tongue.

Eric Chaisson orients his view of the epic around an "arrow of time", which he divides into 'Seven Ages of the Cosmos': particulate, galactic, stellar, planetary, chemical, biological, and cultural. However, such a thermodynamic arrow is not intended to be directional, a common misunderstanding; he sees no purpose, plan, or design in evolution, which he regards as unceasing, uncaring, and unpredictable. Chaisson's scientific analysis of evolution in its sense—cosmic evolution)—implies a unidirectional, meandering process extending from the Big Bang to humankind on Earth, and continuing while likely producing increasing complexity, perhaps forever, to ends unknown. As a physicist, he is perhaps best known for attempting to quantify the epic of evolution, using the currently known laws of science and the scientific method (with its insistence on experimental tests of all ideas, principally those of energy rate density) in order to empirically discriminate between objective sense and subjective nonsense. What emerges is a grand and inspiring scientific narrative of who we are and whence we came—the most recent and up-to-date version of this work having been summarized in a long peer-review article.

== Creation–evolution controversy ==
The creation–evolution controversy goes beyond the field of evolutionary biology and includes many fields of science (cosmology, geology, paleontology, thermodynamics, physics and sociobiology).

In the scientific community there is essentially universal agreement that the evidence of evolution is overwhelming, and the consensus supporting the neo-Darwinian evolutionary synthesis is nearly absolute, creationists have asserted that there is a significant scientific controversy and disagreement over the validity of the evolution epic.

The debate is sometimes portrayed as being between science and religion. However, as the National Academy of Sciences states:

Today, many religious denominations accept that biological evolution has produced the diversity of living things over billions of years of Earth's history. Many have issued statements observing that evolution and the tenets of their faiths are compatible. Scientists and theologians have written eloquently about their awe and wonder at the history of the universe and of life on this planet, explaining that they see no conflict between their faith in God and the evidence for evolution. Religious denominations that do not accept the occurrence of evolution tend to be those that believe in strictly literal interpretations of religious texts.

— Science, Evolution, and Creationism, National Academy of Sciences

John Haught, Roman Catholic theologian, in his Science and Religion: from Conflict to Conversation suggests a theistic acceptance of the Epic. He says contemporary theology is being changed by evolutionary science. There are many versions undergoing constant revision. He considers evolution to be, at least provisionally, a most appropriate and fruitful scientific framework within which to think about God today and deplores that contemporary theology gets hung up in the creationism controversy. He says there are liberal congregations these days that may see the epic of evolution as a history about life and the universe that is both scientific and sacred. The profoundly sacred elements of the story warm up the cold technical facts with awe and reverence, giving Nature an inspiring beauty.

Eric Chaisson, in his book, Epic of Evolution, concludes that the coherent story of cosmic evolution—a powerful and noble effort—may perhaps be the way to ethical evolution in the new millennium. Although his is a decidedly materialistic view of the evolutionary epic, he says that humanity is part of this grand story and that we have a responsibility to survive as the only sentient, intelligent beings known in the universe.

Some of the Epic's advocates are scientists, some are Christians without a scientific background. Some of these Christians see it as a multifaceted concept that has been in Christian theology implicitly for hundreds of years and is congenial to perspectives that include ultimacy, transcendence, purpose and morality. However, there are both humanists and creationists who dispute this stance.

== Outreach efforts ==
In 1996 the Institute on Religion in an Age of Science held a conference on the epic of evolution. In 1997 the American Association for the Advancement of Science organized a conference on the epic of evolution as part of their program on Dialogue on Science, Ethics, and Religion. In July 1999 the Yale Forum on Religion and Ecology, with special support from the Center for Respect of Life and Environment, sponsored a conference titled "The Epic of Evolution and World Religions". It consisted of a small invitational gathering of scholars of the world's religious traditions as well as a number of scientists and educators. It explored how the creation stories of the world's religions intersect with or react to the epic of evolution. An Evolutionary Epic conference was held in Hawaii in January 2008. It was attended by scientists, artists, educators, and spiritual and religious leaders.

Washington University in St. Louis offers a course on the epic of evolution. The Epic has also been taught at Northern Arizona University. The course engaged the task of formulating a new epic myth that is based on the physical, natural, social, and cultural sciences for which there are as yet few textbooks. The course was presented in three segments: the cosmos before humans appeared, the human phenomenon, and scenarios for the future of evolution. An annual undergraduate course on "cosmic evolution" has been taught at Harvard University for most of the past 35 years.

== Educational efforts ==
Connie Barlow

Evolution Sunday, a Christian church event (1,044 Congregations observed it in 2009) arose from the Clergy Letter Project signed in 2004 by 10,500 American clergy. It is spreading internationally and across other faiths. It supports the story of evolution in a manner similar to the Epic (science and religion compatibility) promoting serious discussion and reflection on the relationship between religion and science. "For far too long, strident voices, in the name of Christianity, have been claiming that people must choose between religion and modern science," says Michael Zimmerman, founder of Evolution Sunday and dean of the College of Liberal Arts and Sciences at Butler University in Indianapolis. "We're saying you can have your faith, and you can also have science."

Michael Dowd and his wife Connie Barlow traveled the US by van from 2002 to 2020, as nomads teaching his "Gospel of Evolution".

== See also ==
- Big History
- Cosmic Evolution (book)
- Evolution as theory and fact
- Level of support for evolution
- Modern synthesis (20th century)
- National Center for Science Education
- Natural history
- Objections to evolution
- Religious naturalism
- Spiritual naturalism
- Timeline
- Universal Darwinism
- Scale (analytical tool)
