= Willem B. Drees =

Dutch philosopher (born 1954)

- Born: 20 April 1954 (age 72); Netherlands
- Education: Groningen University (1989); Free University, Amsterdam (1994)
- Known for: Religious Naturalism, Editor of Zygon (journal)
- Awards: Prins Bernhard Fund Prize, Legatum Stolpianum, two Fulbright grants Elected member of KHMW
- Scientific career
- Workplaces: Tilburg University Leiden University

Willem Bernard "Wim" Drees (born 20 April 1954) is a Dutch philosopher. As of the 1st of November 2014, he is professor of philosophy of the humanities at Tilburg University in the Netherlands. From 2008 until 2018 he was the editor-in-chief of Zygon, Journal of Religion & Science and professor of philosophy of religion at Leiden University, the Netherlands.

== Biography ==
Drees was born in the Hague on 20 April 1954 as the third child of five and the only son of Willem Drees Jr. (1922–1998) and Anna Erica Drees-Gescher (1922–1988). His paternal grandfather Willem Drees was the prime minister of the Netherlands from 1948 until 1958. His father was also a Dutch politician being the party leader of the Democratic Socialists '70 from 1971 to 1977.

Drees is a past-president of the European Society for the Study of Science and Theology (ESSSAT).

He is professor emeritus of philosophy of the humanities at Tilburg University in the Netherlands (2014-2020) and of philosophy of religion at Leiden University (2001-2020). From 2008 until 2018 he also served as the editor-in-chief of Zygon: Journal of Religion and Science. In 2018, he was elected as a member of the Royal Holland Society of Sciences and Humanities (KHMW).

Drees has been the editor and publisher of numerous books, journal articles, essays, book reviews, and articles for the wider public. His books include Beyond the Big Bang: Quantum Cosmologies and God (1990), Religion, Science and Naturalism (1996), and Creation: From Nothing until Now (2002), Religion and Science in Context: A Guide to the Debates (2010).

== Religious naturalism and science ==
=== Naturalism ===
Drees addressed in his analysis of cosmology, Beyond the Big Bang the explanatory success of science in addressing big questions and the persistence of limited questions. His second Fulbright grant resulted in the book - Religion, Science and Naturalism (1996). John H. Brooke, historian of science and religion, concluded a review of work of the Oxford theologian Keith Ward and Drees's book: “Because he is as secure in his epistemology as in his knowledge of theoretical physics, Willem Drees should be read by all who take a scholarly interest in the discourses of ‘science and religion’. His arguments cannot be compressed into sound-bites, and that is their strength.” The analysis of naturalism as addressed in his Religious Naturalism and Science has remained a major component in Drees's research. He has also paid attention in his analysis of naturalism to the understanding of human nature, with two edited volumes on anthropology and non-reductive physicalism in Dutch and one in English (2000).

William A. Rottschaefer argues that Drees's naturalism is seriously flawed claiming that it is both methodologically and epistemologically naturalistic. Drees maintains while rejecting both of these that ontological naturalism offers the best account of the natural world. It also provides for a supernaturalistic understanding of religion and theology. Although naturalism is often considered to be antithetical to theology and genuine religion, Drees proposes a scientifically informed account of religion, which, he contends, is not only compatible with supernaturalism and theology but provides a better account of both.

=== Religious naturalism ===
As the Vice President for Interdisciplinary Affairs of IRAS, Drees has participated in the formulative discussions of religious naturalism. He is one of the co-chairs for the IRAS conference in 2021, on Naturalism – as Religion, within Religions, and without Religion. When it comes to his position on this emerging worldview, Drees, says of himself:

Am I a religious naturalist? Others have used that label on me. I am not sure I like the label, as it seems to constrain, whereas I want to explore. I also have some sympathy for the naturalistic theism described above. But certainly, precisely in the attitude of exploring, I fit the naturalism referenced above. Or I at least, I hope do. Even if I am not sure whether I am a religious naturalist, I am most interested in understanding what religious naturalism might mean, may become, and will offer.

Jerome A. Stone in his 2008 book Religious Naturalism Today: The Rebirth of a Forgotten Alternative cites Drees as one of the leaders of the Religious Naturalism movement along with other members of IRAS – Ursula Goodenough, Karl Peters, Connie Barlow, Michael Cavanaugh and Stone himself.

== Works ==
- Naked Ape or Techno Sapiens? The Relevance of Human Humanities - Tilburg, Jan 30 2015, 35 pages,ISBN 978-94-6167-229-2
- Religion and Science in Context: A Guide to the Debates - Routledge, Aug 28 2009, 176 pages, ISBN 978-0-415-55617-0
- Creation: From Nothing until Now. London: Routledge, 2002. - ISBN 978-04-1525-653-7
- Religion, Science and Naturalism. Cambridge University Press, 1996 - ISBN 978-05-1158-532-6
- Beyond the Big Bang: Quantum Cosmologies and God. La Salle: Open Court, 1990 - ISBN 08126-9118-0 (also in Portuguese)
- Willem B. Drees, ed. Technology, Trust, and Religion: Roles of Religion in Controversies on Ecology and the Modification of Life. Leiden University Press, 2009. ISBN 978-90-8728-059-8
- Willem B. Drees, Pieter Sjoerd van Koningsveld, eds., The Study of Religion and the Training of Muslim Clergy in Europe: Academic and Religious Freedom in the 21st Century, Leiden University Press, 2008. ISBN 978-90-8728-025-3
- Willem B. Drees, Hubert Meisinger, Taede A. Smedes, eds., Creation’s Diversity. (IST 5) London: T&T Clark /Continuum, 2008. ISBN 978-05-6703-328-4
- Willem B. Drees, Ulf Görman, Hubert Meisinger, eds., Creative Creatures: Values and Ethical Issues in Theology, Science and Technology (IST 3). London: T&T Clark, 2005 - ISBN 0-567-03089X
- Willem B. Drees (ed.), Is Nature Ever Evil? Religion, Science and Value. Routledge, 2003. - ISBN 0-415-29061-9
- Niels Henrik Gregersen, Willem B. Drees, Ulf Görman, eds., The Human Person in Science and Theology. (IST2). Edinburgh: T&T Clark and Grand Rapids: Eerdmans, 2000. - ISBN 0-8028-3893-6
