= Religious naturalism =

Naturalism in religion

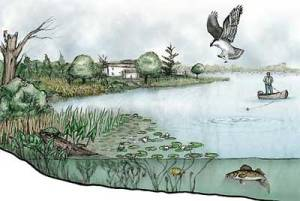
All living beings are interrelated and interdependent.

Religious naturalism is a framework for religious orientation in which a naturalist worldview is used to respond to types of questions and aspirations that are parts of many religions. It has been described as "a perspective that finds religious meaning in the natural world."

Religious naturalism can be considered intellectually as a philosophy and it can be embraced as a part of, or as the focus of, a personal religious orientation. Advocates have stated that it can be a significant option for people who are unable to embrace religious traditions in which supernatural presences or events play prominent roles, and that it provides "a deeply spiritual and inspiring religious vision" that is particularly relevant in a time of ecological crisis.

== Overview ==
=== Naturalism ===
Naturalism is the view that the natural world is all that exists, and that its constituents, principles, and relationships are the sole reality. All that occurs is seen as being due to natural processes, with nothing supernatural involved. As Sean Carroll has put it:

Naturalism comes down to three things:

1. There is only one world, the natural world.
2. The world evolves according to unbroken patterns, the laws of nature.
3. The only reliable way of learning about the world is by observing it.

Essentially, naturalism is the idea that the world revealed to us by scientific investigation is the one true world.

In religious naturalism, a naturalist view (as described above) defines the bounds of what can be believed as being possible or real. As this does not include a view of a personal god who may cause specific actions or miracles, or of a soul that may live on after death, religious naturalists draw from what can be learned about the workings of the natural world as they try to understand why things happen as they do, and for perspectives that can help to determine what is right or good (and why) and what we might aspire to and do.

=== Religious ===
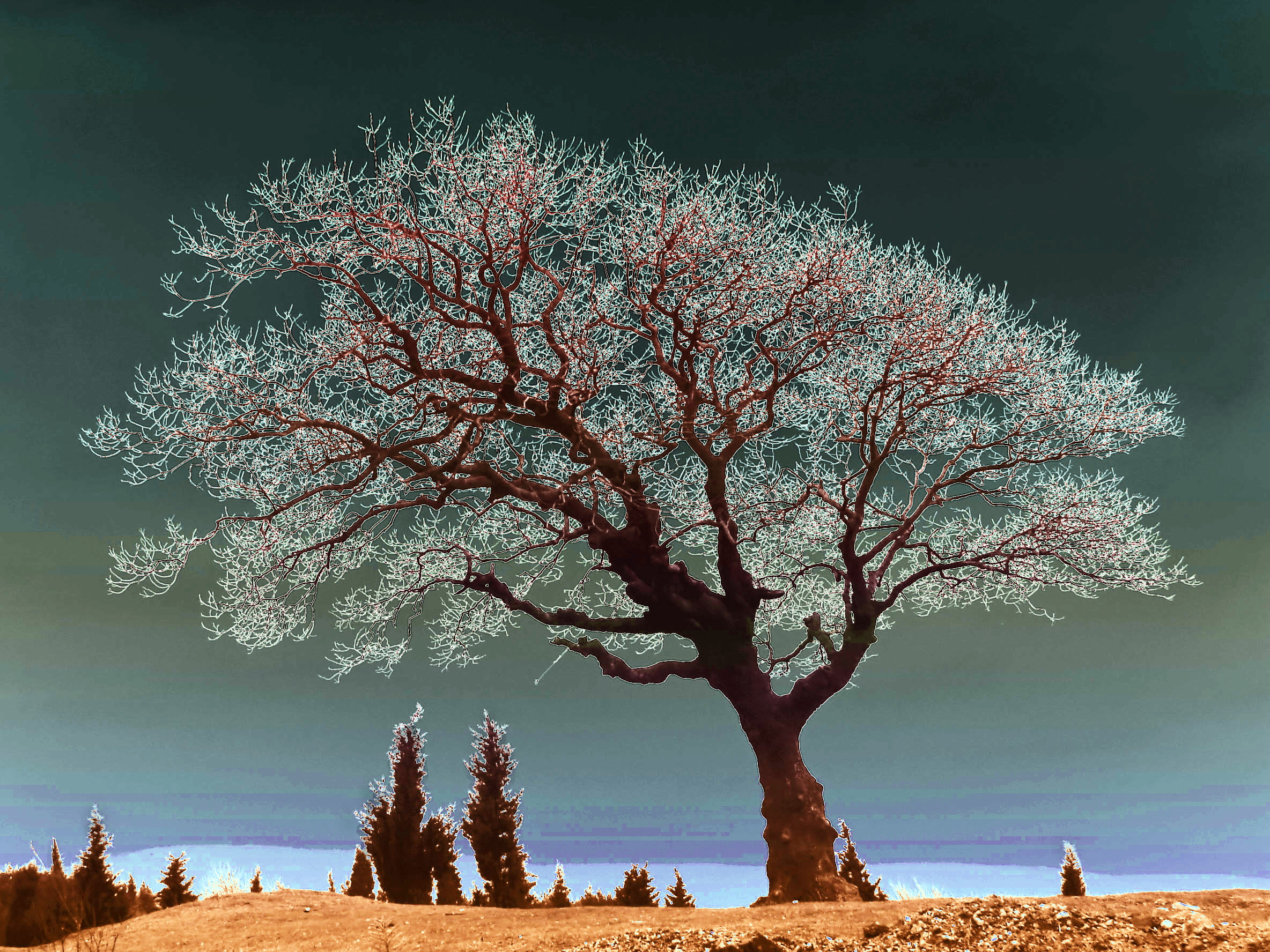
Religious responses to the beauty, order, and importance of nature (as the conditions that enable all forms of life)

When the term religious is used with respect to religious naturalism, it is understood in a general way—separate from the beliefs or practices of specific established religions, but including types of questions, aspirations, values, attitudes, feelings, and practices that are parts of many religious traditions. It can include:

- interpretive, spiritual, and moral responses to questions about how things are and which things matter,
- beliefs, practices, and ethics that orient people to "the big picture" (including our place in relation to a vast and ancient cosmos and other people and forms of life), and
- pursuit of "high-minded goals" (such as truth, wisdom, fulfillment, serenity, self-understanding, justice, and a meaningful life).

As Jerome Stone put it, "One way of getting at what we mean by religion is that it is our attempt to make sense of our lives and behave appropriately within the total scheme of things."

When discussing distinctions between religious naturalists and non-religious (nonspiritual) naturalists, Loyal Rue said: "I regard a religious or spiritual person to be one who takes ultimate concerns to heart." He noted that, while "plain old" naturalists share similar views about what may occur in the world, those who describe themselves as religious naturalists take nature more "to heart", in seeing it as vitally important, and as something that they may respond to on a deeply personal level.

== Shared principles ==
The main principle of religious naturalism is that a naturalist worldview can serve as a foundation for religious orientation.

Shared principles related to naturalism include views that:

- the best way to understand natural processes is through methods of science; where scientists observe, test, and draw conclusions from what is seen and non-scientists learn from what scientists have described;
- for some topics, such as questions of purpose, meaning, morality, and emotional or spiritual responses, science may be of limited value and perspectives from psychology, philosophy, literature, and related disciplines, plus art, myth, and use of symbols, can contribute to understanding; and
- due to limits in human knowledge, some things are currently not well-understood, and some things may never be known.

Shared principles related to having nature as a focus of religious orientation include the view that nature is of ultimate importance—as the forces and ordered processes that enable our lives, and all of life, and that cause all things to be are as they are. As such, nature can prompt religious responses, which can vary for each person and can include:

- a sense of amazement or awe – at the wonder of our lives and our world, and the beauty, order, and power that can be seen in nature,
- appreciation or gratitude – for the gift of life, and opportunities for fulfillment that can come with this,
- a sense of humility, in seeing ourselves as small and fleeting parts of a vast and ancient cosmos,
- an attitude of acceptance (or appreciation) of mystery, where learning to become comfortable with the fact that some things are unable to be known can contribute to peace of mind, and
- reverence – in viewing the natural world as sacred (worthy of religious veneration).

Nature is not "worshipped", in the sense of reverent devotion to a deity. Instead, the natural world is respected as a primary source of truth—as it expresses and illustrates the varied principles of nature that enable life and may contribute to well-being.

With this, learning about nature, including human nature (via both academic and artistic resources and direct personal experiences), is seen as valuable—as it can provide an informed base of understanding of how things are and why things happen as they do, expand awareness and appreciation of the interdependence among all things, prompt an emotional or spiritual sense of connection with other people and forms of life in all of nature, and serve as a point of reference for considering and responding to moral and religious questions and life challenges.

== Tenets ==
As in many religious orientations, religious naturalism includes a central story, with a description of how it is believed that our world and human beings came to be.

In this (based on what can be understood through methods of science), the cosmos began approximately 13.8 billion years ago as a massive expansion of energy, which has been described as "the Big Bang". Due to natural forces and processes, this expansion led over time to the emergence of light, nuclear particles, galaxies, stars, and planets. Life on Earth is thought to have emerged more than 3.5 billion years ago—beginning with molecules that combined in ways that enabled them to maintain themselves as stable entities and self-replicate, which evolved to single-cell organisms and then to varied multi-cell organisms that, over time, included millions of varied species, including mammals, primates, and humans, living in complex interdependent ecosystems.

This story has been described as "The Epic of Evolution" and, for religious naturalists, it provides a foundation for considering how things are, which things matter, and how we should live. It is also seen as having a potential to unite all humans with a shared understanding of our world, including conditions that are essential to all lives, as it is based on the best available scientific knowledge and is widely accepted among scientists and in many cultures worldwide.

From the perspective of religious naturalism humans are seen as biological beings—composed of natural substances and products of evolution who act in ways that are enabled and limited by natural processes. With this, all of what we think, feel, desire, decide, and do is due to natural processes and, after death, each person ceases to be, with no potential for an eternal afterlife or reincarnation. Due to evolving from common ancient roots, many of the processes that enable our human lives (including aspects of body and mind) are shared by other types of living things. And, as we recognize what we share, we can feel a type of kinship or connection with all forms of life. Similarly, recognizing that all forms of life are:

- dependent on conditions on Earth (to provide atmosphere, soil, temperature, water, and other requirements for life) and also
- interdependent with other forms of life (as sources of food, and in contributing to healthy ecosystems),

and in recognizing and appreciating Earth as a rare site, in a vast cosmos, where life exists, and as the environment that is essential for our lives and well-being, this planet and its life-enabling qualities is seen as being of ultimate concern, which can prompt or warrant a felt need to respect, preserve, and protect the varied ecosystems that sustain us.

Values are seen as having accompanied the emergence of life—where, unlike rocks and other inanimate objects that perform no purposeful actions, living things have a type of will that prompts them to act in ways that enable them (or their group) to survive and reproduce. With this, life can be seen as a core/primary value, and things that can contribute to life and well-being are also valued. And, from a religious naturalist perspective, ongoing reproduction and continuation of life (a "credo of continuation"), has been described as a long-term goal or aspiration.

Morality, likewise, is seen as having emerged in social groups, as standards for behavior and promotion of virtues that contribute to the well-being of groups. Evolutionary roots of this can be seen in groups of primates and some other types of mammals and other creatures, where empathy, helping others, a sense of fairness, and other elements of morality have often been seen. It includes promotion of "virtues" (behaviors seen pro-social or "good").

With perspectives of religious naturalism, moral concern is seen as extending beyond the well-being of human groups to an "ecomorality" that also includes concern for the well-being of non-human species (in part, as this recognizes how non-human life can contribute to the well-being of humans, and also as it respects the value of all life).

With recognition that moral choices can be complex (where as some choices benefit one group, they may cause harm to others), an aspiration is that, beyond aspiring to virtues and adhering to social rules, religious naturalists can work to develop mature judgement that prepares them to consider varied aspects of challenges, judge options, and make choices that consider impact from several perspectives.

Advocates of religious naturalism believe that, as they offer perspectives that can help to show how things really are in the physical world, and which things ultimately matter, and as they can contribute to development of religious attitudes, including humility, gratitude, compassion, and caring, and enhance exposure to and appreciation of the many wonders of the natural world, perspectives from religious naturalism can contribute to personal wholeness, social cohesion, and awareness and activities that can contribute to preservation of global ecosystems.

Beyond supporting a credo of continuation that values varied forms of life and ecosystems, aspirations based on religious naturalism include:

- living in harmony with nature,
- exploring and celebrating the mysteries of nature, and
- pursuing goals that enable the long-term viability of the biosphere.

As suggested by Donald Crosby, since nature is regarded as a focus of religious commitment and concern, religious naturalists may "grant to nature the kind of reverence, awe, love and devotion we in the West have formerly reserved for God."

== History ==
Core themes in religious naturalism have been present, in various cultures, for centuries. But active discussion, with the use of this name, is relatively recent.

Zeno (c. 334 – c. 262 BCE, a founder of Stoicism) said:

All things are parts of one single system, which is called Nature ... Virtue consists in a will which is in agreement with Nature

Views consistent with religious naturalism can be seen in ancient Daoist texts (e.g., Dao De Jing) and some Hindu views (such as God as Nirguna Brahman, God without attributes). They may also be seen in Western images that do not focus on active, personal aspects of God, such as Thomas Aquinas' view of God as Pure Act, Augustine's God as Being Itself, and Paul Tillich's view of God as Ground of Being. As Wesley Wildman has described, views consistent with religious naturalism have long existed as part of the underside of major religious traditions, often quietly and sometimes in mystical strands or intellectual sub-traditions, by practitioners who are not drawn to supernatural claims.

The earliest uses of the term, religious naturalism, seem to have occurred in the 1800s. In 1846, the American Whig Review described "a seeming 'religious naturalism'", In 1869, American Unitarian Association literature adjudged:"Religious naturalism differs from this mainly in the fact that it extends the domain of nature farther outward into space and time. ...It never transcends nature". Ludwig Feuerbach wrote that religious naturalism was "the acknowledgment of the Divine in Nature" and also "an element of the Christian religion", but by no means that religion's definitive "characteristic" or "tendency".

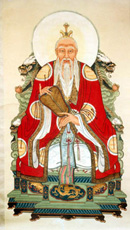
Lao Tzu, traditionally the author of the Tao Te Ching

In 1864, Pope Pius IX condemned religious naturalism in the first seven articles of the Syllabus of Errors.

Mordecai Kaplan (1881–1983), founder of the Jewish Reconstructionist movement, was an early advocate of religious naturalism. He believed that a naturalistic approach to religion and ethics was possible in a desacralizing world. He saw God as the sum of all-natural processes.

Other verified usages of the term came in 1940 from George Perrigo Conger and from Edgar S. Brightman. Shortly thereafter, H. H. Dubs wrote an article entitled "Religious Naturalism: An Evaluation", which begins "Religious naturalism is today one of the outstanding American philosophies of religion..." and discusses ideas developed by Henry Nelson Wieman in books that predate Dubs's article by 20 years.

In 1991 Jerome A. Stone wrote The Minimalist Vision of Transcendence explicitly "to sketch a philosophy of religious naturalism". Use of the term was expanded in the 1990s by Loyal Rue, who was familiar with it from Brightman's book. Rue used the term in conversations with several people before 1994, and subsequent conversations between Rue and Ursula Goodenough [both of whom were active in the Institute on Religion in an Age of Science (IRAS) led to Goodenough's use in her book The Sacred Depths of Nature and by Rue in Religion is Not About God and other writings. Since 1994 numerous authors have used the phrase or expressed similar thinking. Examples include Chet Raymo, Stuart Kauffman and Karl E. Peters.

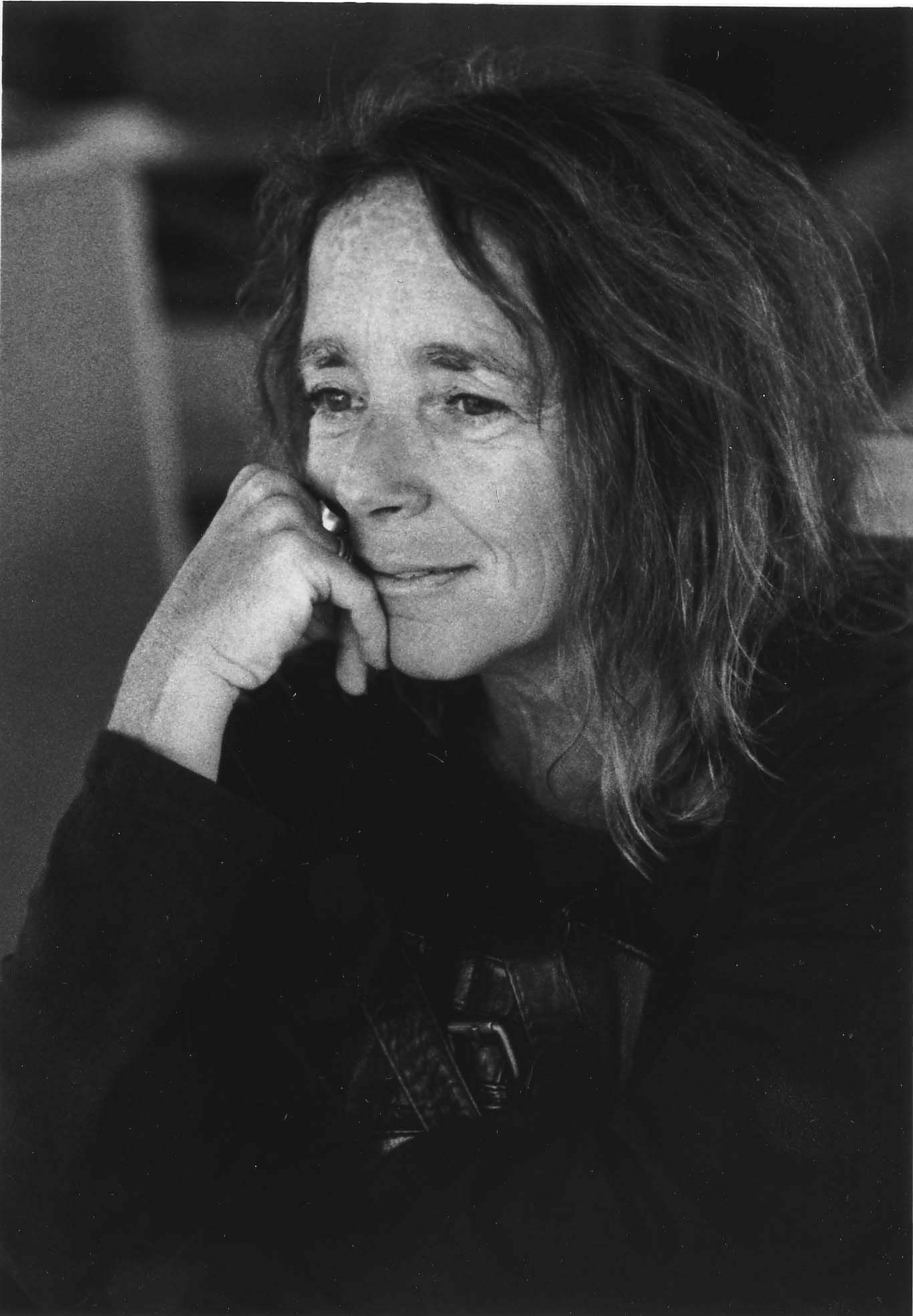
Ursula Goodenough

Mike Ignatowski states that "there were many religious naturalists in the first half of the 20th century and some even before that" but that "religious naturalism as a movement didn't come into its own until about 1990 [and] took a major leap forward in 1998 when Ursula Goodenough published The Sacred Depths of Nature, which is considered one of the founding texts of this movement."

Biologist Ursula Goodenough states:

I profess my Faith. For me, the existence of all this complexity and awareness and intent and beauty, and my ability to apprehend it serves as the ultimate meaning and the ultimate value. The continuation of life reaches around, grabs its own tail, and forms a sacred circle that requires no further justification, no Creator, no super-ordinate meaning of meaning, no purpose other than that the continuation continues until the sun collapses or the final meteor collides. I confess a credo of continuation. And in so doing, I confess as well a credo of human continuation

Donald Crosby's Living with Ambiguity published in 2008, has, as its first chapter, "Religion of Nature as a Form of Religious Naturalism".

Loyal Rue's Nature Is Enough published in 2011, discusses "Religion Naturalized, Nature Sanctified" and "The Promise of Religious Naturalism".

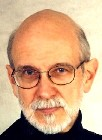
Jerome A. Stone

Religious Naturalism Today: The Rebirth of a Forgotten Alternative is a history by Dr. Jerome A. Stone (Dec. 2008 release) that presents this paradigm as a once-forgotten option in religious thinking that is making a rapid revival. It seeks to explore and encourage religious ways of responding to the world on a completely naturalistic basis without a supreme being or ground of being. This book traces this history and analyzes some of the issues dividing religious naturalists. It covers the birth of religious naturalism, from George Santayana to Henry Nelson Wieman and briefly explores religious naturalism in literature and art. Contested issues are discussed including whether nature's power or goodness is the focus of attention and also on the appropriateness of using the term "God". The contributions of more than twenty living religious naturalists are presented. The last chapter ends the study by exploring what it is like on the inside to live as a religious naturalist.

Chet Raymo writes that he had come to the same conclusion as Teilhard de Chardin: "Grace is everywhere", and that naturalistic emergence is in everything and far more magical than religion-based miracles. A future humankind religion should be ecumenical, ecological, and embrace the story provided by science as the "most reliable cosmology".

Carol Wayne White is among a younger generation of scholars whose model of religious naturalism helps advance socially- and ethically- oriented models of practice. Using the best available insights from scientific studies, White conceives of the human as an emergent, interconnected life form amid spectacular biotic diversity, which has far-reaching ethical implications within the context of ecology, religion, and American life. Her religious naturalism contributes to an intellectual legacy that has attempted to overcome the deficient conceptions of our myriad nature couched in problematic binary constructions. In doing so, her religious naturalism not only presents human beings as biotic forms emerging from evolutionary processes sharing a deep homology with other sentient beings, it also emphasizes humans valuing such connection. In Black Lives and Sacred Humanity: Toward an African American Religious Naturalism (Fordham Press, 2016), White confronts both human–human forms of injustice and ecological forms of injustice that occur when we fail to recognize these basic truths.

As P. Roger Gillette summarizes:

Thus was religious naturalism born. It takes the findings of modern science seriously, and thus is inherently naturalistic. But it also takes the human needs that led to the emergence of religious systems seriously, and thus is also religious. It is religious, or reconnective, in that it seeks and facilitates human reconnection with one's self, family, larger human community, local and global ecosystem, and unitary universe ... Religious reconnection implies love. And love implies concern, concern for the well-being of the beloved. Religious naturalism thus is marked by concern for the well-being of the whole of nature. This concern provides a basis and drive for ethical behavior toward the whole holy unitary universe.

== Varieties ==
The literature related to religious naturalism includes many variations in conceptual framing. This reflects individual takes on various issues, to some extent various schools of thought, such as basic naturalism, religious humanism, pantheism, panentheism, and spiritual naturalism that have had time on the conceptual stage, and to some extent differing ways of characterizing Nature.

The current discussion often relates to the issue of whether belief in a God or God-language and associated concepts have any place in a framework that treats the physical universe as its essential frame of reference and the methods of science as providing the preeminent means for determining what Nature is. There are at least three varieties of religious naturalism, and three similar but somewhat different ways to categorize them. They are:

- An approach to naturalism using theological language but fundamentally treats God metaphorically.
- An approach to naturalism using theological language, but as either (1) a faith statement or supported by philosophical arguments, or (2) both, usually leaving open the question whether that usage as metaphor or refers to the ultimate answer that Nature can be.
- Neo-theistic (process theology, progressive religions) – Gordon Kaufman, Karl E. Peters, Ralph Wendell Burhoe, Edmund Robinson
- Non-theistic (agnostic, naturalistic concepts of god) – Robertson himself, Stanley Klein, Stuart Kauffman, Naturalistic Paganism.
- Atheistic (no God concept, some modern naturalism, Process Naturalism, C. Robert Mesle, non-militant atheism, antitheism) – Jerome A. Stone, Michael Cavanaugh, Donald A. Crosby, Ursula Goodenough, Daniel Dennett, and Carol Wayne White
- A miscellany of individual perspectives – Philip Hefner

The first category has as many sub-groups as there are distinct definitions for god. Believers in a supernatural entity (transcendent) are by definition not religious naturalists, however the matter of a naturalistic concept of God (Immanence) is currently debated. Strong atheists are not considered religious naturalists in this differentiation. Some individuals call themselves religious naturalists but refuse to be categorized. The unique theories of religious naturalists Loyal Rue, Donald A. Crosby, Jerome A. Stone, and Ursula Goodenough are discussed by Michael Hogue in his 2010 book The Promise of Religious Naturalism.

God concepts

- Those who conceive of God as the creative process within the universe—example, Henry Nelson Wieman

- Those who think of God as the totality of the universe considered religiously—Bernard Loomer.

- A third type of religious naturalism sees no need to use the concept or terminology of God—Stone himself and Ursula Goodenough

Stone emphasizes that some religious naturalists do not reject the concept of God, but if they use the concept, it involves a radical alteration of the idea such as Gordon Kaufman who defines God as creativity.

Ignatowski divides religious naturalism into only two types—theistic and non-theistic.

== Notable proponents and critics ==
=== Proponents ===
Proponents of religious naturalism are seen from two perspectives. The first includes contemporary individuals who have discussed and supported religious naturalism, per se. The other includes historic individuals who may not have used or been familiar with the term, "religious naturalism", but who had views that are relevant to and whose thoughts have contributed to the development of religious naturalism.

Individuals who have openly discussed and supported religious naturalism, include:

- Chet Raymo
- Loyal Rue
- Donald A. Crosby
- Jerome A. Stone
- Michael Dowd
- Ursula Goodenough
- Terrence Deacon
- Loren Eiseley
- Philip Hefner
- Ralph Wendell Burhoe
- Mordecai Kaplan
- Henry Nelson Wieman
- George Santayana
- Gordon D. Kaufman
- Stuart Kauffman
- Stanley A. Klein
- C. Robert Mesle
- Karl E. Peters
- Varadaraja V. Raman
- Ian Barbour
- Robert S. Corrington
- Wesley Wildman
- Carol Wayne White

Individuals who were precursors to religious naturalism, or who otherwise influenced its development, include:

- Lao-Tzu
- Albert Einstein
- W.E.B. Du Bois
- Aldo Leopold

=== Critics ===
Religious naturalism has been criticized from two perspectives. One is that of traditional Western religion, which disagrees with naturalist disbelief in a personal God. Another is that of naturalists who do not agree that the word religion can or should be associated with naturalist views making it a semantic error. Critics in the first group include supporters of traditional Jewish, Christian, and Islamic religions. Critics in the second group include:

- Richard Dawkins
- John Haught

== Prominent communities and leaders ==
Religious naturalists sometimes use the social practices of traditional religions, including communal gatherings and rituals, to foster a sense of community, and to serve as reinforcement of its participants' efforts to expand the scope of their understandings. Some other groups mainly communicate online. Some known examples of religious naturalists groupings and congregation leaders are:

- Religious Naturalist Association
- Spiritual Naturalist Society
- Unitarian Universalist Religious Naturalists
- Religious Naturalism Facebook Group
- Universal Pantheist Society founded 1975 – Pantheism is an intercepting concept with religious naturalism
- Congregation Beth Or, a Jewish congregation near Chicago led by Rabbi David Oler
- Congregation of Beth Adam in Loveland Ohio led by Rabbi Robert Barr
- Pastor Ian Lawton, minister at the Christ Community Church in Spring Lake, West Michigan and Center for Progressive Christianity

Religious Naturalism is the focus of classes and conferences at some colleges and theology schools. Articles about religious naturalism have appeared frequently in journals, including Zygon, American Journal of Theology and Philosophy, and the International Journal for Philosophy and Religion.

== See also ==
- Animism – Class of religious beliefs
- Matthew Fox – American priest and theologian (born 1940)
- Daoism – Religious and philosophical tradition
- Epic of evolution – Mythological narrative inspired by evolution
- Epicureanism – Philosophical system
- Fitra – Innate human nature in Islam
- Liberal naturalism – Heterodox form of philosophical naturalism
- Liberal religion – Theological approach emphasizing reason, experience, and adaptation to modernity
- List of new religious movements
- Natural religion – Concept in religious anthropology
- Naturalistic pantheism – Form of pantheism
- Nontheistic religion – Religious thought and practice independent of belief in deities
- Philosophical theism – Belief that a deity exists or must exist
- Postsecularism – Theories about the persistence or resurgence of religion
- Process theology – Type of theology
- Religion – Social-cultural system
- Religious philosophy – Philosophical thinking inspired by a particular religion
- Secular paganism – Upholds virtues and principles associated with paganism while rejecting belief in deities
- Spiritual naturalism – Combined philosophy of spirituality and naturalism
- Zygon: Journal of Religion & Science
