= Gordon D. Kaufman =

American Mennonite theologian (1925–2011)

The Reverend Gordon D. Kaufman
- Born: Gordon Dester Kaufman; June 22, 1925; North Newton, Kansas, US
- Died: July 22, 2011 (aged 86)
- Spouse: Dorothy Wedel (m. 1947; died 1998)

Ecclesiastical career
- Religion: Christianity (Mennonite)
- Church: General Conference Mennonite Church
- Ordained: 1953

Academic background
- Education: Bethel College; Northwestern University; Yale University
- Thesis: The Problem of Relativism and the Possibility of Metaphysics (1955)
- Influences: Karl Barth; R. G. Collingwood; Wilhelm Dilthey; Immanuel Kant; H. Richard Niebuhr; Paul Tillich; Ludwig Wittgenstein

Academic work
- Discipline: Theology
- Sub-discipline: Philosophical theology; systematic theology
- School or tradition: Analytic philosophy; theological liberalism
- Institutions: Pomona College; Vanderbilt University; Harvard University
- Notable works: The Theological Imagination (1981); In Face of Mystery (1993)
- Influenced: Sallie McFague; Karl E. Peters

Gordon Dester Kaufman (22 June 1925 – 22 July 2011) was an American theologian and the Mallinckrodt Professor of Divinity at Harvard Divinity School, where he taught for over three decades beginning in 1963. He also taught at Pomona College and Vanderbilt University, and lectured in India, Japan, South Africa, England, and Hong Kong. Kaufman was an ordained minister in the Mennonite Church for 50 years.

== Early years ==
Kaufman was born on June 22, 1925, in North Newton, Kansas. He earned a Bachelor of Arts degree from Bethel College in 1947. He earned his Master of Arts degree in sociology from Northwestern University in 1948, a Bachelor of Divinity degree from Yale Divinity School in 1951, and a Doctor of Philosophy degree in philosophical theology from Yale University in 1955. His dissertation was titled The Problem of Relativism and the Possibility of Metaphysics. In 1961–1962 he completed a postdoctoral fellowship as a Fulbright Fellow at the University of Tübingen in Germany.

== Career ==
In addition to Kaufman's long tenure at Harvard Divinity School, he was a past president of the American Academy of Religion (1982) and of the American Theological Society, as well as a member of the Society for Buddhist-Christian Studies. Kaufman was the author of 13 books, which influenced how many mainline Christians have considered God language and religious naturalism. Among these are An Essay on Theological Method, God The Problem, Theology for a Nuclear Age, and In the Face of Mystery. This last work earned him the 1995 American Academy of Religion Award for excellence among constructive books in religion. He participated for many years in the discussions on religious naturalism at the Highlands Institute for American Religious and Philosophical Thought and the Institute on Religion in an Age of Science (Lecturer 2006) He was the subject of two Festschriften.

== Views on God ==
In a review of Kaufman's In The Beginning ... Creativity:

For religious people a challenge is to bridge their belief in God with scientific explanations of the world. There is a huge need for a new understanding of God that bridges these viewpoints... His book is the first that makes a big step forward on this issue. Starting with the notion offered in the Bible of God as Creator he offers a proposal of God as "creativity". Creativity as a mystery that somehow was involved in the initial coming into being of the universe, in evolutionary processes, and in human symbolic creativity...This framework is a scholarly step forward towards resolving the faith-science debate. It provides a framework where God is not Protestant, Jew or Muslim. And it plants protection of the environment as a foundation of moral life ... He is following the same theme Albert Einstein described in his writings on religion. And Kaufman's proposal complements the religious naturalist proposals of Ursula Goodenough

In a second review of In the Beginning ... Creativity:

One must wonder what would bring about this radical shift, and Kaufman is very honest with readers about why he believes the traditional understandings of God are inadequate. First, he discusses today's ecological crisis, and asserts that the situation of our world today and the threat of global disaster and decay through human actions is unlike anything Christianity has ever faced before. He not only concludes that this is a bigger issue than Christianity has ever faced (it is before been preoccupied with existential questions of guilt, sin, happiness, and so on), but he further concludes that Christianity may be in the way. The second major development that in his view stands in the way of traditional faith in a personal God is the developments of science (specifically evolutionary cosmology and biology) have shown us a much bigger universe than was once thought to exist. A personal God is not an idea that is comprehensible in this type of setting

Kaufman in his Prairie View lectures says:

I suggested that what we today should regard as God is the ongoing creativity in the universe - the bringing (or coming) into being of what is genuinely new, something transformative;...In some respects and some degrees this creativity is apparently happening continuously, in and through the processes or activities or events around us and within us... is a profound mystery to us humans...But on the whole, as we look back on the long and often painful developments that slowly brought human life and our complex human worlds into being, we cannot but regard this creativity as serendipitous...I want to stress that this serendipitous creativity - God! - to which we should be responsive is not the private possession of any of the many particular religious faiths or systems...This profound mystery of creativity is manifest in and through the overall human bio-historical evolution and development everywhere on the planet; and it continues to show itself throughout the entire human project, no matter what may be the particular religious and or cultural beliefs

A Zygon abstract on a Kaufman article states:

Thinking of God today as creativity (instead of as The Creator) enables us to bring theological values and meanings into significant connection with modern cosmological and evolutionary thinking. This conception connects our understanding of God with today's ideas of the Big Bang; cosmic and biological evolution; the evolutionary emergence of novel complex realities from simpler realities, and the irreducibility of these complex realities to their simpler origins; and so on. It eliminates anthropomorphism and anthropocentrism from the conception of God...This mystery of creativity—God—manifest throughout the universe is quite awe-inspiring, calling forth emotions of gratitude, love, peace, fear, and hope, and a sense of the profound meaningfulness of human existence in the world—issues with which faith in God usually has been associated. It is appropriate, therefore, to think of God today as precisely this magnificent panorama of creativity with which our universe and our lives confront us.

=== God as mystery ===
For Kaufman, the only "available referent" for the word God is the construct we hold in our minds, a construct that has developed over the centuries. There may be a "real referent", but even if there is, it remains "a transcendent unknown". Thus, Kaufman thinks of God as "ultimate mystery". He does not speculate whether there is an "extra-human reality" called God. Thus, as a theologian, he views his work as dealing with "profound, ultimately unfathomable, mystery". Hence the resultant is a "theology within the limits of reason alone", holding with Kant the imaginative construction of basic concepts of religious ideas. Thus, Kaufman developed a "generic theology" for postmodern Christians of "an utterly transcendent God".

The "ultimate mystery" called "God" serves as a living symbol in our culture. For many people, it functions as the primary point for "orientation and devotion." Being oriented on the "ultimate mystery in things" is an awareness of one's "bafflement of mind" over the mystery "that there is something and not nothing." When the mystery is thought of as God, it evokes not only bafflement but trust and confidence.

== Works ==
- In Face of Mystery: A Constructive Theology - Harvard University Press (October 7, 1993), ISBN 0-674-44576-7
- Jesus and Creativity - Fortress Press (July 30, 2006), ISBN 0-8006-3798-4
- In the Beginning-- Creativity - Augsburg Fortress Publishers (July 2004), ISBN 0-8006-6093-5
- God, Mystery, Diversity: Christian Theology In A Pluralistic World - Augsburg Fortress Publishers (March 1, 1996), ISBN 0-8006-2959-0
- An Essay on Theological Method, An American Academy of Religion Book; 3rd edition (January 2, 1995), ISBN 0-7885-0135-6
- Theology for a Nuclear Age - Westminster John Knox Press (May 1985), ISBN 0-664-24628-1
- Theology an Imaginative Construction - Edwards Brothers (1982), ASIN: B0016JFF9A
- The Theological Imagination - Westminster John Knox Press; 1st edition (January 1, 1981), ISBN 0-664-24393-2
- Nonresistance and Responsibility, and Other Mennonite Essays - Faith & Life Press (June 1979), ISBN 0-87303-024-9
- God the Problem - Harvard University Press (December 12, 1972), ISBN 0-674-35526-1
- Systematic Theology - Scribner's (1968), ASIN: B001OXJ7DS
- The Context of Decision;: A Theological Analysis - Abingdon Press; 1st edition (1961), ASIN: B0007EB8QY
- Relativism, Knowledge, and Faith - University of Chicago Press (1960), ASIN: B001P5RABQ
- Theology at the End of Modernity: Essays in Honor of Gordon D. Kaufman - Co-editors Sheila Greeve Davaney & Gordon D. Kaufman, Trinity Pr Intl (October 1991), ISBN 1-56338-017-X
- Mennonite Theology in Face of Modernity: Essays in Honor of Gordon D. Kaufman - Cornelius H. Wedel Historical Series 9, co-editors Gordon D. Kaufman & Alain Epp Weaver - Bethel College (July 1996) - ISBN 0-9630160-7-5

== See also ==
- Christian agnosticism
- Constructive theology
- Liberal Christianity
- Mennonites
- Postchristianity
- Post-theism
- Progressive Christianity
- Spiritual naturalism
- Ursula Goodenough

Academic offices
Preceded by James Luther Adams	Mallinckrodt Professor of Divinity; 1969–1995	Succeeded by Sarah Coakley
Professional and academic associations
Preceded by Avery Dulles	President of the American Theological Society; 1979–1980	Succeeded by Carl F. H. Henry
Preceded by Jill Raitt	President of the American Academy of Religion; 1981–1982	Succeeded by Wilfred Cantwell Smith
