= Spiritual naturalism =

Combined philosophy of spirituality and naturalism

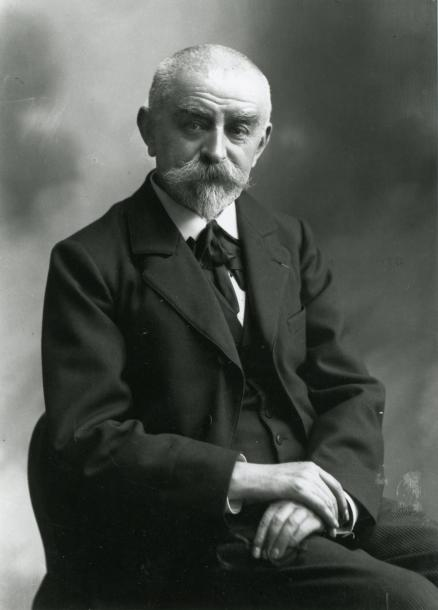
Joris-Karl Huysmans, an early figure of spiritual naturalism

Spiritual naturalism, or naturalistic spirituality combines a naturalist philosophy with spirituality. Spiritual naturalism may have first been proposed by Joris-Karl Huysmans in 1895 in his book En Route.

Coming into prominence as a writer during the 1870s, Huysmans quickly established himself among a rising group of writers, the so-called Naturalist school, of whom Émile Zola was the acknowledged head...With Là-bas (1891), a novel which reflected the aesthetics of the spiritualist revival and the contemporary interest in the occult, Huysmans formulated for the first time an aesthetic theory which sought to synthesize the mundane and the transcendent: "spiritual Naturalism".

Long before the term spiritual naturalism was coined by Huysmans, there is evidence of the value system of spiritual naturalism in Stoicism: "Virtue consists in a will that is in agreement with Nature".

== Terminology ==
=== Spirituality ===
Spirituality (from the Latin root spiritus 'breath, spirit', from spirare 'breathe') is an overarching concept related to religion and "affecting the human spirit or soul as opposed to material or physical things". With many different definitions as scholars try to pin down exactly what it is they are defining, it has tended to have a more positive connotation than religion broadly in recent years because of its "association with personal experiences of the transcendent". It is seen as more positive because of trends toward privileging individuality, and so many different definitions are given it by many different people, any one of them unlikely to satisfy everyone.

In fact, the term is so broad and so dependent on who uses it, how, why, when, and in what context, that some have given up on trying to give it a comprehensive definition and just say that it means something different to all who use it. Perhaps a less necessarily contextual definition is found in the words of K. I. Pargament, who sees spirituality as a "search for the sacred" of each individual.

=== Naturalism ===
Naturalism (from Latin natura 'birth, nature, quality') is "the idea or belief that only natural (as opposed to supernatural or spiritual) laws and forces operate in the world". It has been especially prominent in America, and has been a valuable tool in scientific endeavors to discover the natural laws of the universe as it believes that everything can be explained through the language and explanatory power of empirical scientific experimentation. It is not, however, necessarily a lack of religion; given a definition of religion that includes searching for the truths of the universe, naturalism is eminently describable as such. Scholar Jerome A. Stone gives the definition as "affirm[ing] that attention should be focused on the events and processes of this world to provide what degree of explanation and meaning are possible to this life".

The spiritual variety of naturalism finds ways to reconcile the feelings of awe and religious experience with the idea that everything is natural and can be studied using methods applicable to studying nature, including the place of humans in the universe.

== Origins ==
Spiritual naturalism is a variety of philosophical and religious worldviews that are naturalistic in their basic viewpoint but have a spiritual and religious perspective also. Chief among modern forms of spiritual naturalism are religious naturalism, religious humanism, dualist pantheism, and humanistic religious naturalism. The term may also apply to the beliefs of some naturalistic Pagans, process thinkers, many Taoists, a number of Hindus, and a variety of non-affiliated independent thinkers who base their spiritual experience directly on Nature itself rather than traditional deities and the supernatural (i.e. Epicureans). Some liberal Jewish congregations, nontheist Friends, and Unitarians have similar orientations in their adoption of religious naturalist beliefs.

Although the overall movement toward these attitudes remains relatively small and loosely organized, various forms of spiritual naturalism have existed since time immemorial, with the pantheistic philosophies of Taoism and similar Eastern nature-mysticisms being perhaps the most notable example. At present, there is a growing interest in adopting a spiritual naturalism rational alternative for the modern world because many are losing their belief in more traditional spiritual avenues. This is demonstrated in the recent rapid growth of Religious Naturalism, pantheism (particularly of an avowedly naturalistic variety) and some liberal Christian perspectives. Theologians such as John Shelby Spong and Paul Tillich have embraced thinking that is non-secular naturalist.

Crucial challenges for the spiritual naturalism movement in its various forms currently involve developing and promulgating a conciliate understanding of the somewhat ambiguous terms spirituality and naturalism. The difference in interpreting the difference between religious and spiritual, humanist and naturalist and free will and determinism also needs a consensus. In addition the individualistic nature and thinking of many of the adherents preclude organizing cohesive communities. However recent authors (Ursula Goodenough, Chet Raymo, Karl E. Peters, Loyal Rue and Stuart Kauffman) are highlighting the paradigm via their naturalistic writings.

In addition a few modern theologians with liberal orientations have rejected some of the historical claims of some biblical doctrines and supernaturalism and moved to progressive forms of Christianity and Judaism akin to theistic naturalism. Examples are: Mordecai Kaplan, John Shelby Spong, Paul Tillich, John A. T. Robinson, William Murry and Gordon Kaufman. Some of those into process theology may also be included in this movement.

== Orientation ==
Advocates of spiritual naturalism can vary in their position across the religious spectrum including deism, theism (or process theism), non-theism, and atheism, though it is by no means limited to these orientations. The majority of adherents are believed to be agnostic or atheistic while many prefer not to be categorized. There is a vast difference in opinions on how to address the question of a deity of some kind, if at all. There are those who see God as the creative process within/of the universe, those who define God as the totality of the universe (The All), some who use God in metaphoric ways, those who have no need to use the concept or terminology of God even as a metaphor, and some who are atheistic proclaiming there is no such entity whatsoever and rebel against usage of the term.

Spiritual naturalism is chiefly concerned with finding ways to access traditional spiritual feelings without the inclusion of supernatural elements incompatible with science and a broad naturalism. Adherents believe that nature, in all its diversity and wonder, is sufficient unto itself in terms of eliciting the intellectual and emotional responses associated with spiritual experience, and that there is no need for faith in the traditional anthropomorphic concept of deities or similar ideas.

Adherents of spiritual naturalism are generally scientifically-oriented in most aspects, with their primary difference from other naturalists being their belief that the abandonment of superstition does not necessarily entail the abandonment of spirituality. To adherents, the intellectual and emotional experience of something greater than oneself is seen as a phenomenon of enduring value; spirituality may be seen as "an emotional response to Reality".

== Examples in religions and philosophies ==
=== Judaism ===
Spiritual naturalist ideas are prevalent in Reconstructionist Judaism: a modern Jewish movement based on the ideas of Mordecai Kaplan. Reconstructionist Jews assert that Judaism, as a culture and as a religion, is constantly evolving and adapting to modernity. God is not perceived as a supernatural being, but as being "manifest in the practice of kindness, justice and righteousness on the earth". The reconstructionist conception of God is compatible with the spiritual naturalist's assertion that there is no supernatural; spirituality is manifest in the physical world. Kaplan also states that "the reality of God henceforth will have to be experienced through the functioning of conscience in the conduct of men and nations". To Kaplan and Reconstructionist Jews, God is the collective consciousness of the Jewish community, not a supernatural other. One strives to know God, and to know God is to know how to live morally.

=== Christianity ===
Naturalism in Christianity first appeared among Renaissance humanists, who emphasized the individual and social potential and agency of human beings, seeing human beings as the starting point for serious moral and philosophical investigations. Their concern was to "purify and renew" Christianity, returning ad fontes ("to the sources") to the simplicity of the New Testament, bypassing the complexities of medieval theology.

Christian philosopher John Hick believed that the language of the Bible should be demythologised to be compatible with naturalism. He offered a demythologised Christology, arguing that Jesus was not God incarnate, but a man with incredible experience of divine reality. To Hick, calling Jesus the Son of God was a metaphor used by Jesus' followers to describe their commitment to what Jesus represented. Hick believed that demythologising the incarnation would make sense of the variety of world religions and give them equal validity as ways to encounter God.

With the development of scientific thought and the discoveries in evolution, physics, etc. have come challenges to the Christian worldview. Over time, various ideas on how to reconcile these scientific truths with theological truths of the doctrines of Christianity. There is the once-popular clockwork universe theory, which states that God made the universe to run its course mechanically predetermined; however, this has lost popularity after more discoveries about the probabilistic nature of the universe. There is also the idea that God interferes supernaturally in ways that mask the presence of the supernatural—perhaps at the quantum level where scientists cannot precisely determine anything. This tends toward making a joke of everything scientists strive for.

Another interpretation, one where both truths may be simultaneous and coterminous comes from the New Testament quote "In the beginning was the Word, and the Word was with God, and the Word was God... Through him all things were made; without him nothing was made that has been made." This can be interpreted as saying that the Word of God is not God, but the perfect expression of God that is God and is not God but brings forth creation. In the words of Rudolf Brun "The Christian revelation about creation does not proclaim that creation is an extension or a function embedded in God. Rather, the Word of God that is and remains God is given away to creation. It is a gift that empowers creation to become itself." This allows God to be all things (pantheism) and in all things (panentheism) without either of those cases being true. It allows Christian belief in God to be worked into a worldview where there is no predetermined path for the cosmos, because God so loved the world that the Word was given freely to become nature in all its creativity and freedom.

=== Epicureanism ===
Among the Hellenistic philosophies, the Epicurean tradition stands out as an internally coherent naturalist philosophy complete with its physics, ethics, and cosmology. Due to the meticulous adherence to "epilogismos" (empirical or pragmatic thinking) applied by the founder, Epicurus of Samos, this philosophy is particularly compatible with contemporary scientific insights. It has deep roots in Western culture, and inspired the author of the US Declaration of Independence, Thomas Jefferson, as well as Giordano Bruno, Isaac Newton, and many others.

Epicurean philosophy employs "the Canon" in its epistemology, which is a tool consisting of the five senses, the pleasure and pain faculties, and a faculty tied to language and memory known as "prolepsis". The Epicureans teach that these faculties are our nature-given connection with reality, and insist on clear expression, so as to make sure that language reflects the nature of things. They also incorporate ritual (Eikas is a feast of reason, food, and friendship celebrated the Twentieth of every month and established by Epicurus in his Final Will), community, and other cultural traits traditionally associated with religion.

The epic poem De rerum natura by Lucretius—an ancient epitome of natural philosophy—is the most complete Epicurean writing, together with three of the founder's Epistles, his Principal Doctrines, and the Vatican Sayings. There are also dozens of scrolls that survived the eruption of Mount Vesuvius in the year 79 from Herculaneum, which were curated by Philodemus of Gadara. Some Unitarian ministers, a denomination of Secular Humanist Jews, and others have incorporated Epicureanism into their liturgies and traditions in various ways. There are also Epicurean organizations in Greece, Italy, Australia, and the US.

=== Taoism ===
"The term Tao means 'way', 'path', or 'principle', and can also be found in Chinese philosophies and religions other than Taoism. In Taoism, however, Tao denotes something that is both the source of, and the force behind, everything that exists. Taoist propriety and ethics may vary depending on the particular school, but in general they tend to emphasize Wu-wei (action through non-action), 'naturalness', simplicity, spontaneity, and the Three Treasures: compassion, moderation, and humility." "Though Tao is ultimately transcendent, it is also immanent. In this secondary sense it is the way of the universe, the norm, the rhythm, the driving power in all nature, the ordering principle behind all life."

Tao can be talked about, but not the Eternal Tao.

Names can be named, but not the Eternal Name. As the origin of heaven-and-earth, it is nameless:

As the "Mother" of all Things it is nameable.

=== Buddhism ===
"In a way, Spiritual Naturalism could be looked at as a form of philosophical Buddhism. There are many schools and ways of conceiving of Buddhism and practicing it. Many of Buddhism's concepts can be interpreted in naturalistic terms. Buddhism has certainly inspired the Spiritual Naturalist practices of meditation, mindfulness, compassion, and more. Therefore, there is much overlap and many people are both Buddhists and Spiritual Naturalists". The Noble Eightfold Path and the Five Precepts of Buddhism are rooted in right relationship between the devotee, morality, and practices that align with naturalism.

=== Humanist-Atheist ===
Whilst robotic design is generally inspired by biological forms it is possible to use the engineering model in reverse to redefine obscure terminology. For example infinity is an imaginary dumping ground for mathematicians, so perhaps God may be a holding token for anything as yet unknown, which may be closer to the Great Commandment than the complex and somewhat anthropomorphized deities of Yahweh or Trinity? Likewise:

- A human Body can be equated to a set of actuators physically implementing change
- A human mind operates as a microcontroller or firmware providing sensory coordination to the actuator movement
- A human spirit provides the motivating rational intent or conscious motivation that is personality or morality
- The soul of a person is entirely ephemeral, but enduring tangible consequence for humanity. e.g. discovery of fire or cooking accelerating digestion, thus providing humanity with sufficient spare time to subsequent devise stone tools, the antecedents of combination of induction hobs and food processors sometimes called robot chefs in an age of the internet of things!
- The ghost of a person is the emotional consequence of ideas divined and communicated to others such as beliefs or processes. The ghost of Albert Einstein's Mass–energy equivalence is apparent in quantum mechanics.

== See also ==
- Cosmic consciousness – 1901 book by Richard Bucke
- List of new religious movements
- Naturalistic pantheism – Form of pantheism
- Nature worship – Worship of nature spirits
- Process philosophy – Philosophical approach
- Religious humanism – Integration of humanist ethical philosophy
- Religious naturalism – Naturalism in religion
- Secular spirituality – Adherence to spirituality without religious adherence
- Syntheism – New religious movement
- Waking Up: A Guide to Spirituality Without Religion – 2014 book by Sam Harris
