= Philip Hefner =

American professor and theologian (1932–2024)

- 1997 photograph of Hefner
- Born: December 10, 1932; Denver, Colorado, U.S.
- Died: April 27, 2024 (aged 91); Chicago, Illinois, U.S.
- Education: Midland University; Lutheran School of Theology at Chicago; University of Chicago
- Scientific career
- Fields: Systematic theology Philosophy of religion Theology of culture
- Workplaces: Lutheran School of Theology at Chicago
- Notable students: Ann Pederson, Anne Kull, Mladen Turk, Eduardo Cruz, Stewart Herman

Philip Hefner (December 10, 1932 – April 27, 2024) was an American theologian. He was professor emeritus of systematic theology at the Lutheran School of Theology at Chicago.

== Life and career ==
His research career has focused on the interaction of religion and science, for which he is most well known. Hefner held several dozen visiting teaching and lecturing appointments at seminaries, colleges, and universities in the United States, Europe, Africa, and Asia. He was an ordained minister of the Evangelical Lutheran Church, and taught in numerous Lutheran seminaries in America.

In 1988, Hefner was instrumental in bringing to fruition the vision of Ralph Wendell Burhoe by helping to create the Chicago Center for Religion and Science, which later was renamed the Zygon Center for Religion and Science. He was the first director of the center and remained in that capacity from 1988 until 2003, at which point Antje Jackelén succeeded him. Today the Zygon Center is directed by Lea Schweitz.

He was an editor for Zygon: Journal of Religion & Science the leading journal of religion and science in the world. He retired as editor at the end of 2008. Dutch scholar Willem B. Drees was named as his successor at the Journal. Hefner was four times co-chair of the annual conference of the Institute on Religion in an Age of Science (IRAS). In this activity he was a leader in the discussions there on the evolving paradigm of religious naturalism. Hefner is a prominent figure in this emergence belief. It distances itself from traditional religions seeing religious aspects in the world which can be appreciated in a naturalistic framework rather than relying on the supernatural. He is an individualist in his approach.

Hefner writes "A second alternative response, often identified as “religious naturalism,” is composed of a cross-section of people, many of whom are scientists, who are fashioning a religious worldview that is consistent with their personal outlook and/or free of those encumbrances of traditional religion which they consider conceptually anachronistic and morally dangerous. Religious naturalism is a variety of naturalism which involves a set of beliefs and attitudes that there are religious aspects of this world which can be appreciated within a naturalistic framework."

Audrey R. Chapman says of him: "Philip Hefner is perhaps the theologian who has grappled the most seriously and explicitly with the evolution of human nature. His approach to this topic, particularly in his work ‘The Human Factor’ is to sacralize the process of evolution....like several other thinkers, Hefner presents a bio-cultural evolutionary paradigm of Homo sapiens...For him, culture is a happening in nature"

Hefner died on April 27, 2024, at the age of 91.

== Legacy ==
Hefner was a Senior Fellow at the Metanexus Institute where one can find his biography.

The Publications Board of Zygon has established the Philip Hefner Fund to honor the 20 years of outstanding editorial leadership that was demonstrated by Hefner.

== Selected works ==
Hefner Publications

Over 150 scholarly articles, about half of which deal with religion and the natural sciences, while the other half deal with traditional historical and theological issues.

- Faith and the Vitalities of History: A Theological Study Based on the Thought of Albrecht Ritschl - Harper and Row, 1966
- Changing Man: The Threat and the Promise- Doubleday, 1968
- The Promise of Teilhard - Lippincott, 1970
- Defining America: A Christian Critique of the American Dream (with Robert Benne) - Fortress Press, 1974
- The Human Factor: Evolution, Culture, Religion - Fortress Press, 1993 (Templeton Foundation's Best Books in Religion and Science Award also Good Reads Award)
- Natur-Weltbild-Religion - Bavarian Evangelical Press, Munich, 1995
- Biocultural Evolution and the Created Co-Creator - in Ted Peters (ed.), Science and Theology: The New Consonance - Westview Press, 1998
- When Worlds Converge: What Science and Religion Tell Us about the Story of the Universe and Our Place in It (with others) - Open Court, 2001, ISBN 0-8126-9451-1 (Good Reads Award)
- Technology and Human Becoming - Fortress Press, 2003 (Good Reads Award)
- Religion-and-Science as Spiritual Quest for Meaning - Pandora Press, 2008
- Human Becoming in an Age of Science, Technology, and Faith - Edited by Jason P. Roberts and Mladen Turk - Lexington Books / Fortress Academic, 2022

Hefner translated and edited a volume of German theologian Albrecht Ritschl's shorter writings, Three Essays by Albrecht Ritschl – Fortress Press, 1972. He contributed two essays Creation and Church to the two-volume work, Christian Dogmatics – eds., Carl Braaten and Robert Jenson – Fortress Press, 1984. His 2002 Rockwell lectures, delivered at Rice University, on the theme of the Created Co-Creator were to be published by Trinity International Press.
