= Stanley Klein =

Stanley Klein may refer to:

- Stanley H. Klein (1908-1992), American architect
- Stanley A. Klein, American neuroscientist
