= The Sacred Depths of Nature =

Book by Ursula Goodenough

- Author: Ursula W. Goodenough
- Publisher: Oxford University Press
- Publication date: 1998
- Pages: 220
- ISBN: 0-19-512613-0
- OCLC: 38842032
- Dewey Decimal: 574/.01 21
- LC Class: QH331 .G624 1998

The Sacred Depths of Nature is a 1998 book by biologist Ursula W. Goodenough on the history of life on earth within the context of religious naturalism. It has recently been translated into Persian as Minoo-ye Tabi'at (Persian: مینوی طبیعت).
