= Roy John =

Roy John may refer to:

- E. Roy John (1924–2009), founder of neurometrics
- Roy John (footballer) (1911–1973), Welsh international football goalkeeper
- Roy John (rugby union) (1924–1981), Welsh rugby player
