= Henry Nelson Wieman =

American academic and theologian

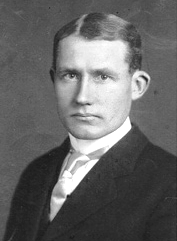
- Wieman in 1912, from the collection of his daughter, Kendra Smith
- Born: August 19, 1884; Rich Hill, Missouri, U.S.
- Died: June 19, 1975 (aged 90); Grinnell, Iowa, U.S.
- Education: Park College; San Francisco Theological Seminary; Harvard University
- Known for: Natural religion, empirical theology
- Awards: UUA Award for Distinguished Service to the Cause of Liberal Religion.
- Scientific career
- Fields: Theology, philosophy
- Workplaces: Occidental College; University of Chicago; University of Oregon; West Virginia University; University of Houston; UCLA; Washington University; Grinnell College; Southern Illinois University
- Doctoral advisor: Ralph Barton Perry

Henry Nelson Wieman (1884–1975) was an American philosopher and theologian. He became the most famous proponent of theocentric naturalism and the empirical method in American theology and catalyzed the emergence of religious naturalism in the latter part of the 20th century. He has two grandsons who are prominent physicists, Carl Wieman and Howard Wieman, and his son-in-law Huston Smith was a prominent scholar in religious studies.

== Early life ==
Wieman studied at Park College in Parkville, Missouri, graduating in 1907. In 1910, he graduated from the San Francisco Theological Seminary and moved to Germany for two years to study at the universities in Jena and Heidelberg. There, he studied under the theologians Ernst Troeltsch and Adolf von Harnack and the philosopher Wilhelm Windelband, but they all had little impact on Wieman.

Wieman moved back to the United States and spent four years as a Presbyterian pastor in California. Then, he studied at Harvard Faculty of Arts and Sciences to do a doctorate in philosophy, which he received in 1917, under the tutelage of William Ernest Hocking and Ralph Barton Perry. At Harvard, Wieman became interested in the work of John Dewey, Henri Bergson, and Alfred North Whitehead.

== Career ==
After Harvard, Wieman started teaching at Occidental College. In 1927, as one of America's only Whitehead experts, Wieman was invited to the University of Chicago Divinity School to give a lecture explaining Whitehead's thought. Wieman's lecture was so brilliant that he was promptly hired to the faculty as Professor of Christian Theology, and taught there for twenty years, and for at least thirty years afterward Chicago's Divinity School was closely associated with Whitehead's thought. He retired in 1949.

In the years following, Wieman taught at University of Oregon, West Virginia University, University of Houston College of Liberal Arts and Social Sciences, UCLA College of Letters and Science, Arts and Sciences at Washington University in St. Louis, and Grinnell College. In 1956, he was hired as distinguished visiting professor of philosophy at Southern Illinois University Carbondale. Wieman retired for the third time in 1966.

== Religious naturalism ==
Wieman was instrumental in shaping thinking about religious naturalism. In 1963 he wrote, "It is impossible to gain knowledge of the total cosmos or to have any understanding of the infinity transcending the cosmos. Consequently, beliefs about these matters are illusions, cherished for their utility in producing desired states of mind.... Nothing can transform man unless it operates in human life. Therefore, in human life, in the actual processes of human existence, must be found the saving and transforming power which religious inquiry seeks and which faith must apprehend."

In 1970, he redefined God in a way that some religious naturalists would latch on to: "How can we interpret what operates in human existence to create, sustain, save and transform toward the greatest good, so that scientific research and scientific technology can be applied to searching out and providing the conditions - physical, biological, psychological and social - which must be present for its most effective operation? This operative presence in human existence can be called God."

He had a naturalistic worldview, a form of neo-theistic religious naturalism. For Wieman, God was a natural process or entity and not supernatural and was an object of sensuous experience. His God concept was similar to The All concept of Spinoza and theistic sectors of classical pantheism and modern neo-pantheism but with a liberal Christian tone to it.

He had been ordained a Presbyterian minister in 1912 but in 1949, while teaching at the University of Oregon, he became a member of the Unitarian Church. Nevertheless, he was at the extreme edge of Christian modernism and was critical of 20th-century supernaturalism and neo-orthodoxy.

Wieman helped start Zygon: Journal of Religion & Science, which was prompted by discussions at the Institute on Religion in an Age of Science. Six days after his death in 1975, he was awarded the Unitarian Universalist Association Award for Distinguished Service to the Cause of Liberal Religion.

Robert Bretall, editor of The Empirical Theology of Henry Nelson Wieman, volume 4 of the Library of Living Theology, wrote: "Like most great thinkers Wieman escapes categorization. Influences have come to bear upon him, but he has quietly absorbed them and gone his own way, impervious to the ebb and flow of theological fashions. It is quite possible that he may be what his students have almost unanimously acclaimed him - the most comprehensive and most distinctively American theologian of our century."

== Major works ==
- Religious Experience and Scientific Method - Macmillan, 1926
- The Wrestle of Religion with Truth - Macmillan, 1927
- Methods of Private Religious Living - Macmillan, 1929
- The Issues of Life: Mendenhall Lectures - Abingdon Press, 1930
- Is there a God?: A Conversation with Henry Nelson Wieman, Douglas Clyde MacIntosh and Max Carl Otto - Willet, Clark & Company, 1932
- Normative Psychology of Religion - Henry Nelson Wieman, with Regina Westcott Wieman - Crowell, 1935
- American Philosophies of Religion - Henry Nelson Wieman, Bernard Eugene Meland, Willett, Clark & Company, 1936
- The Growth of Religion - Part I by Walter Marshall Horton, Part II by H.N. Wieman: "Contemporary Growth of Religion" - Willet, Clark, 1938
- Now We Must Choose - The Macmillan company, 1941
- The Source of Human Good - Southern Illinois Univ. Press, 1946
- Religious Liberals Reply: by Seven Men of Philosophy - H.N. Wieman, Arthur E. Murray, Gardner Williams, Jay William Hudson, M.C. Otto, James B. Pratt, and Ray Wood Sellars - Beacon Press, 1947
- The Directive in History - Ayer Lectures - Beacon Press, 1949
- Man's Ultimate Commitment - Southern Illinois University Press, 1958
- Intellectual Foundation of Faith - Philosophical Library, 1961
- Religious Inquiry: Some Explorations - Beacon Press, 1968
- Religious Experience and Scientific Method - Southern Illinois University Press (Arcturus Books reprint with new Preface), 1971
- Seeking a Faith for a New Age: Essays on the Interdependence of Religion, Science, and Philosophy - Scarecrow Press, 1975, ISBN 0-8108-0795-5
- Creative Freedom: Vocation of Liberal Religion - The Pilgrim Press, 1982 [apparently written in the 1950s, edited by Creighton Peden and Larry E. Axel]
- The Organization of Interests - Wieman's doctoral dissertation of 1917 [on creativity as the best principle by which to organize interests], edited by Cedric Lambeth Hepler, University Press of America, 1985
- Science Serving Faith - one of Wieman's last theological statements written near the end of his life, and completed by editors Creighton Peden and Charles Willig, Scholars Press, 1987
