= Stanley A. Klein =

American psychophysicist

- Education: Ph.D Physics – Brandeis 1967 B.S. Physics – Caltech 1961
- Known for: Research in Neurotechnology
- Awards: First Place: 1956 California mathematics competition
- Scientific career
- Fields: Optometry, human vision, neurometrics, consciousness studies
- Workplaces: University of California at Berkeley

Stanley A. Klein is an American psychophysicist. He is Professor of Vision Science and Optometry at the University of California, Berkeley and a member of the Berkeley Visual Processing Laboratory. He was a consulting editor for Attention, Perception, & Psychophysics, a publication of the Psychonomic Society which promotes the communication of scientific research in psychology and allied sciences. His major area of research has been neurotechnology, a field of science that studies the body and mind through the nervous system by electronics and mechanisms. He was the co-chair for the SPIE (an international society on the science and application of light) meetings on human vision. Klein has authored and co-authored numerous papers on visual perception in the human brain. He is currently interested in the intersection of religion and science.

== Professional experience ==
Klein's major area of research has been neurometrics and neurotechnology. Neuroscience with the development of non-invasive human brain imaging now uses human subject volunteers, The questions being researched get at some fundamental questions of what it means to be human and to have a mind. The revolution in technologies that has made this maturation possible extends from gene to hospital bed-side and is now referred to as neurotechnology. Some examples of neurotechnology include the CAT scanner, fMRI, Magnetoencephalography (MEG), Positron emission tomography, high-throughput genetic sequencing, brain proteomics and psychopharmaceuticals. These technologies also include neural modeling simulations, biological computers, and human-brain interfaces (prosthetics).

- 1967-1981: Assistant Prof. - Full Prof., Joint Science Dept., Claremont Colleges, Claremont, CA.
- 1972-1973: Visiting Faculty, Psychology Dept., Stanford University, Stanford, CA.
- 1974-1981: Visiting Associate, Division of Biology, Caltech, Pasadena, CA.
- 1978-1979: Sabbatical at Harvard and Smith-Kettlewell Institute of Visual Science, San Francisco, CA.
- 1981-1987: Professor, College of Optometry, University of Houston, Houston, Texas.
- 1987: Professor, University of California at Berkeley, School of Optometry

He currently (2011) is a thesis advisor for graduate students in the Berkeley Vision Processing Laboratory. He has over 190 published articles in the area of vision perception.

Klein has worked to developed new methods for obtaining and analyzing evoked EEG/MEG (electro- and magneto-encephalography) and related fMRI data that will provide needed spatio-temporal resolution. In order for M/EEG to become a widely used tool for analyzing brain function it is necessary to go from the sensor information (magnetic fields for MEG and electric potentials for EEG) to the identification (locations, orientations and time functions) of the multiple brain sources. He has helped to develop a novel set of stimuli that allows the collection of a much larger set of data than ever previously collected without increasing the data collection time. New algorithms overcome the "rotation problem" and to minimize the "mis-specification" problem so that the location, orientation and time functions of multiple cortical sources are identified.

== Grants and awards ==
- NIH/NEI, 5/1/00-4/30/03. $170,000 per year. "High Spatial Frequency Feature Acuity in Spatial Vision."
- CULAR, Collaborative UC-Los Alamos grant. 9/00 - 8/03. $45,000 per year. "Locating sources of brain activity in space and time"
- NIH/NEI, 5/1/04-4/30/09. $200,000 per year. "High Spatial Frequency Feature Acuity in Spatial Vision."
- NIH/NEI, 7/1/04-6/30/07. $275,000. "Where and when of cortical activity measured with EEG and fMRI."
- DARPA subcontract, 10/1/05-9/30/06. $155,110. "Neurotechnology for Image Analysts."

== Publications ==
Complete listings:

- Publications from 2000 to 2002, with commentaries
- Publications from 1996 to 1999, with commentaries
- Publications from 1993 to 1996, with commentaries
- Commentaries on Stanley Klein's Research Articles

== National committees and editorships ==
- Optical Society of America, Vision Advisory Committee (1984–1989)
- Ad Hoc Study Sections for NIH (1986, 1987, 2000, 2001)
- Chaired meetings at annual meetings of Optical Society, ARVO,
- Consulting editor for Perception and Psychophysics (1991–present).
- Co-chair for the SPIE meeting on Human Vision (1992–present).
- Co-chair for the SID meeting on Human Factors (1992–1993).
- Topical editor of Journal of Optical Society for Vision (1990, 1992–1999).
- Executive committee of Association for the Scientific Study of Consciousness (1994–1997)

Klein has for many years been a member of the Institute on Religion in an Age of Science (IRAS), where he has been active in the discussions on Religious Naturalism and how it relates to Reconstructionist Judaism.
