= Donald A. Crosby =

American philosopher (born 1932)

- Born: 7 April 1932 (age 94); Mansfield, Ohio, U.S.
- Education: Columbia University; Princeton Theological Seminary; Davidson College
- Known for: religious naturalism
- Awards: see #Awards
- Scientific career
- Fields: Ancient Philosophy, 17th and 18th Century Philosophy, American Philosophy, Philosophy of Nature, Metaphysics, Existentialism, Philosophy of Religion
- Workplaces: Florida State University; Colorado State University; Centre College

Donald Allen Crosby (born 7 April 1932) is an American theologian who is professor emeritus of philosophy at Colorado State University, since January 2000. Crosby's interests focus on metaphysics, American pragmatism, philosophy of nature, existentialism, and philosophy of religion. He is a member of the Highlands Institute of American Religious and Philosophical Thought and has been a leader in the discussions on Religious Naturalism.

== Biography ==
Crosby is a religious naturalist having contributed to the movement with six books and a number of journal articles and chapters in books. He argues that nature itself, without notions of any gods, animating spirits, or supernatural beings or realms of any kind, is both metaphysically and religiously ultimate, and thus an appropriate and compelling focus of religious commitment and concern. Nature as a whole can be considered sacred. This is so despite the radical ambiguities of nature, or its intricate mixtures of goods and evils, to which he calls sustained attention in his 2008 book Living with Ambiguity: Religious Naturalism and the Menace of Evil.

He was born in Mansfield, Ohio, and grew up in Pensacola, Florida. He attended Davidson College in North Carolina and trained for the Presbyterian ministry at Princeton Theological Seminary. He was minister of a Presbyterian church in Christiana, Delaware, for three years and decided after that time to study for a doctorate in religion, with emphasis on philosophy of religion and ethics, in the joint program in religion at Union Theological Seminary and Columbia University in New York City. During the first two years of his doctoral work he served as part-time assistant minister at the First Congregational Church on the Green in Norwalk, Connecticut. Following upon his doctoral studies, he became an assistant professor of philosophy and religion at Centre College in Danville, Kentucky. In the fall of 1965 he began teaching religious studies and philosophy in the philosophy department at Colorado State University, from which he retired as Emeritus Professor of Philosophy in 2001.

Crosby demitted the Presbyterian ministry in 1969 and began to develop his version of religious naturalism in writings dating from the early 1990s, reaching fuller expression in A Religion of Nature in 2002, and continuing to the present. Impetus for this process of development also dates from the writing of his book on philosophical nihilism, The Specter of the Absurd, published in 1988 and from his study of, and constructive work on, theories of religion in Interpretive Theories of Religion, published in 1981. The writing of his doctoral dissertation on Horace Bushnell’s theory of language, published in 1975 as Horace Bushnell’s Theory of Language in the Context of Other Nineteenth Century Philosophies of Language, contributed greatly to the freeing of his mind from any vestiges of biblical or theological literalism, as did his studies of the origins and characters of the Hebrew and Christian scriptures at Princeton.

In addition, Crosby’s exposure to the field of world religions at Columbia helped to broaden his thought far beyond its earlier religious conservatism. The God is Dead movement in the 1960s, and especially its reflections on theological implications of the atrocities of the Nazi regime and the carnage of World War II, had an important influence on his abandonment of traditional theism. Finally, teaching courses on the philosophy of religion and on various philosophical systems in a secular university challenged him constantly to reflect on the relevance of religious and philosophical thought for his time and to continue to work out his own religious and philosophical outlook. He has been strongly influenced by the thought of William James, John Dewey, Alfred North Whitehead, and Paul Tillich in doing so, but other great philosophical and religious thinkers of the Western tradition have made their decisive contributions to his outlook as well, as have important writers about Eastern ways of thinking and living. Still another major influence on Crosby’s outlook is the findings of contemporary science, especially in the fields of cosmology, evolutionary biology, and ecology.

Crosby summarizes much of his current mode of religious and philosophical thought with four “Ps”: pluralism, perspectivism, processism, and pragmatism. Discussion of the natures and interrelations of these four themes in his philosophy is presented, among other places, in his 2005 book Novelty and in the book Living with Ambiguity. To these four major themes typifying Crosby’s philosophical and religious outlook should be added the theme of his religious and philosophical naturalism. A sixth basic theme, also developed in his book Novelty, is the theme of emergentism, especially the emergence of life from non-life and of conscious life from organic life in general. A final important theme brought to the fore in this book is his defense of indeterminism and freedom. This theme is given further development in his books "Nature as Sacred Ground" and "Consciousness and Freedom." All these themes have far-reaching consequences for philosophy of nature and a religious naturalism.

The individual perspectives on religious naturalism of Loyal Rue, Jerome A. Stone, Ursula Goodenough and Crosby are discussed by Michael Hogue in his 2010 book The Promise of Religious Naturalism.

== Awards ==
- 1994 - John N. Stern Distinguished Professor Award for Teaching and Research College of Liberal Arts, Colorado State University
- 1989 - Burlington Northern Faculty Achievement Award for Graduate Teaching and Research, Colorado State University
- 1981 - Honors Professor Teaching Award, Colorado State University
- 1959—1962 - Lilly Tuition Scholarship, Union Theological Seminary, New York, New York
- 1955 - Robert L. Maitland Prize in New Testament Exegesis, Princeton Theological Seminary, Princeton, New Jersey
- 1955 - Archibald Alexander Hodge Prize in Systematic Theology, Princeton Theological Seminary, Princeton, New Jersey

== Selected publications ==
=== Books ===
- 1975 - Horace Bushnell’s Theory of Language, in the Context of Other Nineteenth-Century Philosophies of Language, The Hague, Mouton Publishers
- 1981 - Interpretive Theories of Religion, The Hague: Mouton Publishers
- 1988 - The Specter of the Absurd: Sources and Criticisms of Modern Nihilism, Albany, NY: State University of New York Press
- 2002 - A Religion of Nature, Albany, NY: State University of New York Press.
- 2005 - Novelty, Lanham, MD: Lexington Books
- 2008 - Living with Ambiguity: Religious Naturalism and the Menace of Evil, Albany, NY: State University of New York Press
- 2011 - Faith and Reason: Their Roles in Religious and Secular Life, Albany, NY: State University of New York Press.
- 2013 - The Thou of Nature: Religious Naturalism and Reverence for Sentient Life, Albany, NY: State University of New York Press.
- 2013 - The Philosophy of William James: Radical Empiricism and Radical Materialism, Lanham:MD: Rowman & Littlefield.
- 2014 - More Than Discourse: Symbolic Expressions of Naturalistic Faith, Albany, NY: State University of New York Press.
- 2015 - Nature as Sacred Ground: A Metaphysics for Religious Naturalism, Albany, NY: State University of New York Press.
- 2017 – Consciousness and Freedom: The Inseparability of Thinking and Doing, Lanham, MD: Lexington Books.
- 2017 - The Extraordinary in the Ordinary: Seven Types of Everyday Miracle, Albany, NY: State University of New York Press.
- 2018 - Faith and Freedom: Contexts, Choices, and Crises in Religious Commitments, London and New York: Routledge
- 2018 - Partial Truths and our Common Good: A Perspectival Theory of Truth and Value, Albany, NY: State University of New York Press.
- 2020 - Primordial Time: Its Irreducible Reality, Human Significance, and Ecological Import, Lexington Books.

=== Edited volumes ===
- 1996 - Religious Experience and Ecological Responsibility (with Charley D. Hardwick), Selected Papers from the Second International Conference on Philosophical Theology University of St. Andrews, St. Andrews Scotland, August 5–9, 1993. Peter Lang Publishing, Inc.
- 1997 - Pragmatism, Neo-Pragmatism, and Religion: Conversations with Richard Rorty (with Charley D. Hardwick), Selected Papers from Highlands Institute for American Religious Thought Conference Meeting with Richard Rorty in Highlands, North Carolina, June 20–24. Peter Lang Publishing, Inc.
- 2001 - Religion in a Pluralistic Age (with Charley D. Hardwick), Selected Papers from the Third International Conference on Philosophical Theology, Evangelische Akadamie, Bad Boll, Germany, July 29-August 3, 1998. Peter Lang Publishing, Inc.
- 2018 - Routledge Handbook of Religious Naturalism (with Jerome A. Stone), London and New York: Routledge.

=== Articles and chapters ===
- 1993 - The Ultimacy of Nature: An Essay on Physidicy, in The American Journal of Theology and Philosophy, 14/3: 2-14.
- 1998 - Nature and Human Nature: Impacts and Implications of Science Since 1859 (with Charles Smith), in Perspectives on the Unity and Integration of Knowledge ed. Garth Benson, et al. New York, NY: Peter Lang Publishing, Inc., Counterpoints, vol. 39, 39-53.
- 2003 - Transcendence and Immanence in a Religion of Nature,” American Journal of Theology and Philosophy, 24/3: 245-259.
- 2003 - Naturism as a Type of Religious Naturalism, Zygon, 38/1: 117-120.
- 2005 - The Emergentist Alternative: A Critique of Pansubjectivism, in Nature, Truth, and Value, ed. George Allan and Merle Allshouse, a Festschrift volume in honor of Frederick Ferré. Lanham, MD: Lexington Books, 67-81.
- 2007 - A Case for Religion of Nature and Further Contributions to the Dialogue, Journal for the Study of Religion, Nature and Culture, 1/4: 489-502, 508-509.
- 2007 - Religious Naturalism, entry in The Routledge Companion to the Philosophy of Religion, ed. Paul Copan and Chad V. Meister. London: Routledge, 1145-62.
- 2010 - Both Red and Green but Religiously Right: Coping with Evil in a Religion of Nature, American Journal of Theology and Philosophy, 31/2: 108-123.
- 2016 - Probabilism, Emergentism, and Pluralism: A Naturalistic Metaphysics of Radical Materialism, American Journal of Theology and Philosophy, 37/3.
