= Loyal Rue =

American philosopher of religion (born 1944)

- Born: June 7, 1944 (age 81)
- Education: B.A., University of Minnesota; M.Div., Luther Theological Seminary; Ph.D., Hartford Seminary
- Known for: Naturalist theory of religion
- Scientific career
- Fields: Philosophy of religion
- Institutions: Luther College

Loyal D. Rue (born June 7, 1944) is an American philosopher of religion. He is a professor emeritus of religion and philosophy at Luther College of Decorah, Iowa. He focuses on naturalistic theories of religion and has been awarded two John Templeton Foundation fellowships. He has held fellowships at Harvard University and at Durham University (UK). He has been for many years a member and lecturer at the Institute on Religion in an Age of Science (IRAS).

== Views ==
Rue in his writings and teaching has been a proponent of religious naturalism and environmentalism:

Religious naturalists will then be known for their reverence and awe before Nature, their love for Nature and natural forms, their sympathy for all living things, their guilt for enlarging ecological footprints, their pride in reducing them, their sense of gratitude directed toward the matrix of life, their contempt for those who abstract themselves from natural values, and their solidarity with those who link their self-esteem to sustainable living.

In Religion Is Not About God, Rue proposed that at the heart of almost all religions and cultures is a story – a myth. This is due to humans being emotional, narrative beings. Religions use what Rue called "ancillary strategies" to promote and make flourish their doctrines. He named five strategies: intellectual, experiential, ritual, aesthetic, and institutional (pages 128–142). To these may be added participants, practices, teachings, and social behavior.

In the Epilogue of Everybody's Story, Rue wrote:

There is nothing in the substance of everybody's story to rule out belief in the reality of a personal deity. At the same time, such a belief is not an essential part of everybody's story. There will be theistic versions of the story, and there will be nontheistic versions as well. Those who take the theistic option will have at their disposal a range of images that may be used to arouse motivational systems. But I have confidence that everybody's story, unadorned by theological imagery, has the potential to arouse us to serve its imperatives. Let us see.

== Reception ==
Edward O. Wilson said of Rue's Religion Is Not About God: "This book is an important step towards the naturalistic, hence truly general theory of religion. It harmonizes contemporary scientific understanding of the origin of human nature with a positive view of the centrality of religious culture."

The individual perspectives on religious naturalism of Donald A. Crosby, Jerome A. Stone, Ursula Goodenough and Rue are discussed by Michael Hogue in his 2010 book The Promise of Religious Naturalism.

== Major publications ==
- Nature is Enough: Religious Naturalism and the Meaning of Life, State University of New York Press, 2012, ISBN 1438438001
- Religion Is Not About God: How Spiritual Traditions Nurture Our Biological Nature And What to Expect When They Fail, Rutgers University Press, 2006, ISBN 0813539552
- Everybody's Story: Wising Up to the Epic of Evolution, State University of New York Press, 1999, ISBN 0791443922
- By the Grace of Guile: The Role of Deception in Natural History and Human Affairs, Oxford University Press, 1994, ISBN 0195075080 (A New York Times Notable Book)
- Amythia: Crisis in the Natural History of Western Culture, University Alabama Press, 1989, ISBN 0817351361

Rue also served as co-editor of the volume Contemporary Classics in Philosophy of Religion, Open Court Pub. Co., 1991, ISBN 0812691687
