= Varadaraja V. Raman =

Indian-American scholar

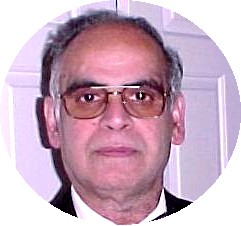
- Born: 28 May 1932 (age 94); Calcutta, India
- Citizenship: Indian, USA
- Education: University of Calcutta, Theoretical Physics; University of Paris, PhD, Theoretical Physics, 1958
- Known for: Religion/Science dialogues, champion of science and enlightened values, bridge-building efforts between cultures, and a sense of humor
- Awards: Metanexus Fellow, Raja Rao Award, Acharya Vidyasagar, IRAS Academic Fellow Award, Nazareth College Interfaith Partnership Award, RITirees Award
- Scientific career
- Workplaces: Rochester Institute of Technology

Varadaraja Venkata Raman (better known as V. V. Raman; born 28 May 1932 in Calcutta, India) is a professor emeritus of physics and humanities at the Rochester Institute of Technology.

He has lectured and written on his Indian heritage and culture and has also authored books and articles on the intersection of science and religion. Raman has been a frequent guest on the PBS television series Closer to Truth.

Scholarly reception of his work has been mixed, with some criticizing his apologias for the metaphysical claims of Hinduism, and others commending his contributions to the conversation on these issues.

== Career ==
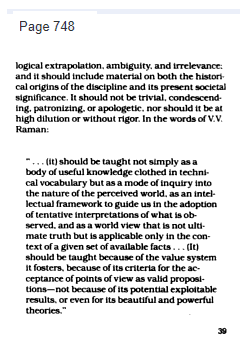
Text from the United States Congressional Record quoting Varadaraja V. Raman.

Raman was born to a Brahmin Tamil family residing in Bengal. He did his undergraduate work in physics, with a first postgraduate degree in mathematics. He did his doctoral studies in theoretical physics at the Sorbonne in Paris, in French under Nobel laureate Louis de Broglie. The focus was the mathematical underpinning of quantum mechanics. He served the UNESCO for several years, "living in many nations as an educational expert for the United Nations." Eventually, Raman emigrated from Calcutta in 1966, and joined the Rochester Institute of Technology in Rochester, New York as a professor of Physics and Humanities. He would then spend many years as chairman of the RIT Physics Department.

By 1983, Raman had become an occasional guest columnist for the Rochester Democrat and Chronicle. In 1991, Raman served on a panel to "investigate possible CIA influences on academic programs", and determine whether RIT should cut ties with the American Central Intelligence Agency. He was elected the 2004–2005 Metanexus Institute Fellow on Science and Religion, in which capacity he delivered six lectures at the Hillel Hall of the University of Pennsylvania on Indic Visions in an Age of Science. In 2006, Raman received the Raja Rao Award for Literature, given for "outstanding contributions to the literature and culture of the South Asian Diaspora".

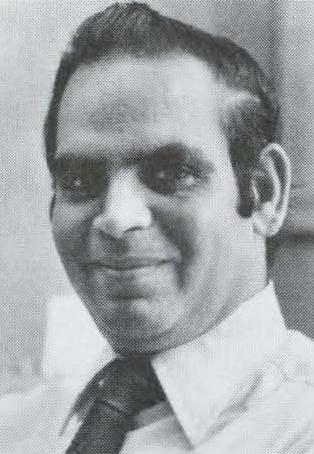
Raman circa 1985

=== Reference works ===
Raman contributed articles or other work to several reference works such as dictionaries and encyclopedias, including Scribner's Dictionary of Scientific Biography (1981), and the Sage Encyclopedia of Religious and Spiritual Development, 1st Edition (2005). In the mid 2000s Raman served as both a contributing author and one of four executive editors of the eighteen-volume Encyclopedia of Hinduism.

=== Closer to Truth ===
Since 2008, Raman has been a frequent guest on the PBS television series Closer to Truth, first appearing as a guest in the series 3 inaugural episode "Does God Make Sense?" He has since made thirty-two additional appearances in the series, the last of these being in 2017.

=== Institute on Religion in an Age of Science ===
From 2011 to 2013, Raman was president of the Institute on Religion in an Age of Science. As one of the few adherents to a non-Abrahamic religion to hold that position, he contributed to "a significant impact in enlarging the horizon of IRAS toward more inclusiveness". During this period of the service (2012), Raman was a lecturer at the Chautauqua Institution.

=== Other activities ===
An admirer of Mahatma Gandhi, Raman spoke publicly in favor of the adoption of Gandhi's methods in the United States. Raman received attention for his role in the public mourning of the Indian community following the assassinations of Indira Gandhi in 1984, and Rajiv Gandhi in 1991. Following the September 11 attacks in 2001, Raman chaired an interfaith community effort to foster "peace, harmony and understanding among countries, races, and religions"; he had once expressed that "not on one occasion of interacting with Americans was I made to feel as a foreigner."

== Reception ==
Robert M. Geraci, chair of religious studies at Manhattan University, describes Raman as "well-known in American conversations about religion and science", and "the leading voice in this problematic approach to Hinduism and science—who should nevertheless be commended for his work in bringing such conversations to the fore of academic inquiry", and states that Raman "represents the community seeking harmony between Hinduism and science." Elsewhere, Geraci observes that Raman "maintains a tenuous balance between credulity and skepticism." Though Raman has written in defense of the proposition that religions should accept the truth of evolution by natural selection, philosopher C. Mackenzie Brown has criticized Raman's approach, noting that Raman has written that certain scientific truths "can also be apprehended through the mystical mode via meditation, prayer, or yogic exercises", and grouping Raman with Subhash Kak and Gopala Rao as "scientists [who] employ their expertise to confirm teachings of the sadhus and, not infrequently, to deplore the naturalistic theory of Darwinian evolution." Brown concludes that for Raman, "the urge to lyricize and scientize tradition is clearly irresistible".

Yiftach Fehige, prefacing an anthology featuring Raman's writing, similarly critiques Raman's approach to Western religions, describing Raman as positioning himself "in opposition to fundamental principles and insights that characterize the field of science and religion" as outlined previously in the book. Fehige notes as well that Raman discounts the ability of Christianity to have been a force behind the development of modern science. Numen's review of the piece finds that Raman "embraces generalizations, willfully brackets (i.e., ignores) local contingencies, and defines both science and religion as essential human phenomena," and "distinguishes "ancient" from "modern" science in normative epistemological terms, showing little interest in historical categorizations or even chronology," but that "despite its many flaws, one commendable outcome of Raman's argument is its disentanglement of "science" and scientific conduct from the clutches of theological biases that see it as intrinsically linked to European Christendom."

Another text noted that Raman responded to Wendy Doniger's criticism of the Bhagavad Gita as a text promoting war by imploring "bookish academics" to show sensitivity to the sacredness accorded the text. Krista Tippett says "V.V. Raman describes... how Hinduism's overarching regard for beauty and the arts has helped to avoid a point-counterpoint between the different forms of knowledge that science and religion convey."

== Publications ==
Robert M. Geraci identified Raman as "the most prolific author on Hinduism and science". Raman has published a large number of books and articles, some through traditional publishing companies and others through self-publication venues.

=== Books ===
- Truth and Tension in Science and Religion (Beech River Books, 2009)
- Indic Visions in an Age of Science (Metanexus, 2011)

=== Other ===
- Raman, V. V.; Forman, Paul (1969). "Why Was It Schrödinger Who Developed de Broglie's Ideas?". Historical Studies in the Physical Sciences. 1: 291–314. doi:10.2307/27757299. ISSN 0073-2672. JSTOR 27757299..
- "Albert Einstein: The Human Side", with Helen Dukas, American Journal of Physics, Volume 47, Issue 12, p. 1107 (1979).
- One of the numerous contributing authors to Scribner's Dictionary of Scientific Biography (1981).
- "Technology Has Improved Society", for Technology and Society: Opposing Viewpoints by Auriana Ojeda, Opposing Viewpoints series, Greenhaven Press (2002), p. 23.
- One of the 108 contributing authors to the Sage Encyclopedia of Religious and Spiritual Development, 1st Edition (2005).
- "Exposing Academic Hinduphobia", book review (2007).
- Contributing author and one of four executive editors of the Encyclopedia of Hinduism produced by the Indian Heritage Research Foundation and published by Rupa & Co. (2010).
- "Science International (Beyond the West): The Ups and Downs of Trans-Cultural Science", in Science and Religion: East and West, edited by Yiftach Fehige, Routledge (2015).
- "Thoughts on Deism and Pandeism," in Pandeism: An Anthology of the Creative Mind (John Hunt Publishing, 2019) ISBN 1789041031.

== Personal life ==
The Tamil language is Raman's mother tongue. One source notes that Raman has a "long-running interest in questions of science and religion", and another that he "meditates each morning on symbols of numbers, music, and science, describing this as an aesthetic experience." In Ira Flatow's book, Present at the Future, Raman describes considering himself to be "as much a physicist as one devoted to the other dimension of human life, mainly the spiritual". Raman has two children, a son and a daughter, Indira, a neurobiologist and director of the Northwestern University Interdepartmental Neurosciences (NUIN) PhD Program.
