= European Society for the Study of Science and Theology =

Scholarly organisation studying relationship between natural sciences and theology

ESSSAT is a scholarly, non-confessional organization, based in Europe, which aims to promote the study of relationships between the natural sciences and theological views. ESSSAT has members from almost every European country as well as members from other continents. They have different confessional backgrounds, and may include believers as well as non-believers and atheists. Every two years, ESSSAT organizes an international conference, each time on a different venue in Europe. Two prizes for outstanding research are awarded on these conferences: the ESSSAT Student Prize and the ESSSAT Research Prize. ESSSAT publishes three series: Issues in Science and Theology (IST), Studies in Science and Theology (SSTh), and ESSSAT-News (a quarterly newsletter). The organization was founded in the mid-1980s. Its current president is Dirk Evers, who succeeded Antje Jackelén, leading ESSSAT from 2008 to 2014. ESSSAT's president from 2002 to 2008 was Dutch theologian Willem B. Drees.

== See also ==
- Institute on Religion in an Age of Science (A similar American organization)
- Zygon Center for Religion and Science (Chicago) (A similar American organization)
- Center for Theology and the Natural Sciences (Berkeley) (A similar American organization)
- Zygon: Journal of Religion and Science (a related journal)
- Theology and Science (a related journal)
- Issues in Science and Religion
