= Neurometrics =

Science of measuring the brain's electrical activity

Neurometrics is the science of measuring the underlying organization of the brain's electrical activity. Certain brainwave frequencies are associated with general psychological processes. EEGs are used to measure the brain waves.

== Overview ==
According to E. Roy John, the pioneer in the field of neurometrics, neurometrics is

"a method of quantitative EEG that provides a precise, reproducible estimate of the deviation of an individual record from normal. This computer analysis makes it possible to detect and quantify abnormal brain organization, to give a quantitative definition of the severity of brain disease, and to identify subgroups of pathophysiological abnormalitites within groups of patients with similar clinical symptoms. Reliable and meaningful results require an adequate amount of good quality raw data, correlated with age, transformed for Gaussian distributions, and corrected for intercorrelations among measures. Neurometric analysis is able to detect consistent patterns of abnormalities in patients with subtle cognitive dysfunctions and psychiatric disorders. These analyses may also prove useful in determining therapy and monitoring its efficacy."

In 1977, Roy John and Robert Thatcher published one of the first texts in the field of neurometrics. The text was entitled Neurometrics.

The field of Neurometrics began to expand significantly in the 1990s. This was due in part to the advent of inexpensive methods of linking computers to traditional EEG devices. This allowed researchers to transform analog EEG signals into digital signals for statistical analysis. Leading researchers in the field included Frank Duffy, E. Roy John, and Robert Thatcher. Between the 1980s and the present time, thousands of articles in the field of neurometrics have been published.

Entrepreneurs began to take notice of the potential of neurometrics in the late 1980s. In 1991, Lexicor Medical Technology filed one of the first U.S. Food and Drug Administration (FDA) class two filings in the field of Neurometric software and related EEG devices, called the NeuroSearch-24.

NxLink Ltd. built upon the Lexicor Medical Technology 510(k)s with their filing of the Neurometric Analysis System in 1998. Robert Thatcher filed a 510(k) with the FDA on his Neuroguide Analysis System in 2004. The Thatcher filing was then followed by an FDA filing by BRC Operations PTY Limited, with their BRC Software Product in 2005.

Each of these devices represented software which was capable of comparing a subject's EEG data to a normative database; the software also allows clinicians to measure the subject's variance from normal. This technique promises to allow clinicians to evaluate various mental and psychiatric conditions.
