= Ralph Wendell Burhoe =

American theologian

Ralph Wendell Burhoe (May 21 or June 21, 1911 – May 8, 1997) was an American theologian. His work centered on the importance of religion in a scientific and technological world. He was awarded the Templeton Prize in 1980.

== Biography ==
Ralph Wendell Burhoe was born on 21 June 1911, in Somerville, Massachusetts. He attended Harvard University from 1928 to 1932 as a student of meteorology and climatology, though never completing his degree. He then entered Andover Newton Theological School. Burhoe spent eighteen months in theological study at Andover. Instead of becoming a minister as he had planned, he returned to Harvard University as an employee of the Blue Hill Meteorological Observatory, finding some success as a scientist. He went on to become the first full-time executive director of the American Academy of Arts and Sciences starting in 1947. His position at the AAAS brought him into close contact with such eminent scientists as the astronomer Harlow Shapley, the geologist Kirtley Mather, and the biologist George Wald. While there, he was one of the founders of the Institute on Religion in an Age of Science. In 1965, Burhoe joined the faculty at the Meadville Lombard Theological School, the Unitarian Universalist seminary then in Hyde Park, Chicago. There he facilitated the founding of Zygon: Journal of Religion and Science and the Center for Advanced Study in Religion and Science (CASIRAS). After retiring from Meadville in 1974 he was affiliated with the Lutheran School of Theology at Chicago, where in 1988 he founded the Chicago Center for Religion and Science. His ashes are interred in the crypt at First Unitarian Church of Chicago where he was a member.

== Contributions ==
Ralph Wendell Burhoe pursued a passionate investigation into the differences and similarities of theology and science, becoming one of the world's most informed voices in communicating this evolving research. He played a major role in the interdisciplinary pursuit of issues at the boundary of science and religion by offering a common ground for dialogue. According to theologian Hans Schwarz, the journal Zygon has "achieved a circulation far beyond the confines of theological journals".

== Awards and honors ==
- In 1980 he was the first American to win the Templeton Prize for Progress in Religion.
- Honorary doctorates from Meadville Lombard Theological School (1977) and Rollins College (1979).
- The Society for the Scientific Study of Religion, of which he was a founder, bestowed on him its first Distinguished Career Achievement Award in 1984.
- Fellow of the American Association for the Advancement of Science, the American Academy of Arts and Sciences, and the World Academy of Arts and Letters.

== Works ==
- Science and Human Values in the 21st Century, Philadelphia: Westminster Press, 1971.
- Review: Spencer Lavan, Journal of the American Academy of Religion, Volume 40, Issue 3, (Sep., 1972), page 410
- Review: David O. Moberg, Review of Religious Research, Vol. 14, No. 2, (Winter, 1973), pages 134-134
- Toward a Scientific Theology, Christian Journals Ltd., 1981, ISBN 9780904302707

== See also ==
- List of science and religion scholars
