= Yiftach Fehige =

German philosopher

- Born: 1976 (age 49–50)

Academic background
- Education: BSc (Physics), BA (Theology), BA (Philosophy), MA (Theology), MA (Philosophy), PhD (Philosophy), PhD (Theology)

Academic work
- Discipline: Philosophy
- Institutions: University of Toronto
- Main interests: thought experiments, philosophy of sexuality

Yiftach Fehige (born 1976) is a German-Canadian scholar of science and religion, with training in physics, philosophy, and theology. He is currently a member of the core faculty of the Institute for the History and Philosophy of Science and Technology at the University of Toronto. Fehige is internationally renowned for his contributions to the study of thought experiments. His research profile is notably diverse, as he published on the Jewish-Christian dialogue, and furthered the development of a pluralist theory of human sexuality.

== Life ==
Yiftach Fehige was born in 1976. He pursued studies in physics, philosophy, and theology at various institutions, including the Goethe University Frankfurt, the University of Mainz, LMU Munich, and the University of Tübingen. In 2004, he earned a Ph.D. in Logic and Philosophy of Science from the University of Mainz, followed by a Ph.D. in Systematic Theology from the University of Tübingen in 2011. Yiftach Fehige relocated to Canada in 2007 to assume his current position at the University of Toronto. He was granted tenure in 2012 and obtained Canadian citizenship the same year. Identifying as Jewish, Yiftach Fehige is married and has three children.

== Select publications ==
- Thought Experiments, Science, and Theology, Brill 2024
- Handbook of Thought Experiments (ed. With M. Stuart and J. R. Brown), Routledge 2018
- Science and Religion: East and West (ed.), Routledge 2016
- Das Offenbarungsparadox. Auf dem Weg zu einem christlich-jüdischen Dialog, Paderborn 2012.
- Die Geschlechterosion des semantischen Realismus. Eine logisch-semantische Untersuchung zum Begriff des biologischen Geschlechts. Paderborn: Mentis-Verlag 2006.
- Sexualphilosophie. Eine einführende Annäherung, Berlin 2007.
