= E. Roy John =

American physicist (1924–2009)

Erwin Roy John
- Born: August 14, 1924; Brownsville, Pennsylvania, United States
- Died: February 28, 2009 (aged 84)
- Education: University of Chicago
- Spouse: Leslie Prichep-John
- Children: Six
- Scientific career
- Fields: Quantitative Electroencephalography and neurometrics

Erwin Roy John (August 14, 1924 – February 28, 2009) was a pioneer in the field of quantitative electroencephalography and neurometrics.

== Chronology ==
Erwin (E.) Roy John was born in Brownsville, Pennsylvania, United States. During the Great Depression he was a union organizer in an airplane plant. His attendance at City College of New York was interrupted by World War II, where he volunteered and served in the Battle of the Bulge. After the war, he attended University of Chicago earning a BA in physics and a PhD in psychology. He began work on brain research at UCLA and later founded brain research laboratories at the University of Rochester and at Flower Fifth Avenue Hospital. He was also a professor of psychiatry at NYU and a research scientist at the Nathan S. Kline Institute for Psychiatric Research. His work led to more than 25 patents in medical technology.

== Neurometrics and other research ==
The field of neurometrics was invented by John. He also did fundamental work on memory, originating the idea that memory was distributed throughout the brain.

He was a developer of quantitative electroencephalography (QEEG) and, together with his colleagues, developed algorithms that let QEEG be used to measure many psychological and mental problems.

== Brain Research Laboratories ==
John founded Brain Research Laboratories at NYU School of Medicine in 1974. He served as its director for over 30 years. Research he led at BRL led to advances in the diagnosis and treatment of coma, learning disabilities, autism and brain injury from blast damage or repeated concussion.

== Politics ==
John was interested in politics from childhood; in college, he founded a group to oppose McCarthyism; he was involved in the opposition to the Vietnam War and made frequent visits to Cuba.

== Bibliography ==
- Thatcher, Robert (1977). Foundations of cognitive processes. Hillsdale, N.J. New York: Lawrence Erlbaum Associates Distributed by Halsted Press. ISBN 978-0470989265.
- John, E (1967). Mechanisms of memory. New York London: Academic Press. ISBN 978-0123858504.
- John, E (1990). Machinery of the mind : data, theory, and speculations about higher brain functions : based on the First International Conference on Machinery of the Mind, February 25-March 3, 1989, Havana City, Cuba. Boston: Birkhäuser. ISBN 9780817634612.
- John, E (1977). Neurometrics : clinical applications of quantitative electrophysiology. Hillsdale, N.J. New York: L. Erlbaum Associates Distributed by the Halsted Press Division, Wiley. ISBN 9780470992722.
- John, E (1989). Neurometric evaluation of brain function in normal and learning disabled children. Ann Arbor: University of Michigan Press. ISBN 9780472080854.
