= Karl E. Peters =

American academic professor (1939–2025)

Karl Peters
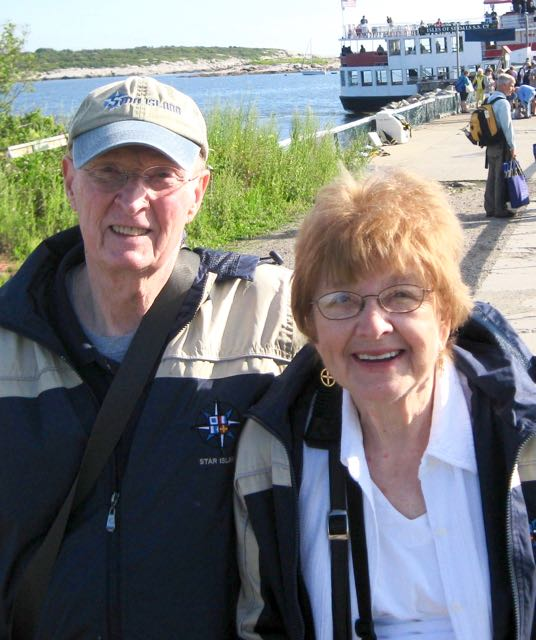
- Peters (left) in 2014
- Born: 6 June 1939; Wisconsin, United States
- Died: 12 February 2025 (aged 85)
- Education: Carroll University (BA); McCormick Theological Seminary (MDiv); Columbia University (PhD)
- Known for: Former Editor and Co-editor of Zygon, former President of the Institute on Religion in an Age of Science, and current President of the Center for Advanced Study in Religion and Science.
- Spouse(s): Carol (m. 1999, died) Marjorie Davis (m. 1999; died 2019)

Karl Edward Peters (6 June 1939 - 12 February 2025) was a professor emeritus of religion at Rollins College, Winter Park, Florida, and former adjunct professor of philosophy, University of Hartford, Hartford, Connecticut and adjunct professor of religion and science, Meadville Lombard Theological School, Chicago. He also is the former editor and then co-editor of Zygon: Journal of Religion and Science, and is a founder, organizer, and first president of the University Unitarian Universalist Society in central Florida. His scholarly research and teaching focuses on issues in science and religion, including the concept of God and evolution, epistemology in science and religion, world religions and the environment, and religious and philosophical issues in medicine.

Peters has been for many years a member and lecturer at the Institute on Religion in an Age of Science, where he has been active in the development of Religious Naturalism. He has six times served as co-chair of the annual conference.

- 2014 - Science and Religion in a Globalizing World
- 2011 - Doing Good, Doing Bad, Doing Nothing: Scientific and Religious Perspectives
- 2005 - Varieties of Spiritual Transformation: Scientific and Religious Perspectives
- 1997 - The Evolution of Morality
- 1992 - Global Ecology and Human Destiny
- 1986 - Free Will: Is It Possible and Is it Desirable?
- 1978 - The Future of the Child: Religious and Scientific Perspectives

Peters' current focus in on developing a Christian Religious Naturalism.

He died in 2025.

== Major publications ==
- Dancing With the Sacred: Evolution, Ecology, and God - Trinity Press International, 2002, ISBN 1-56338-393-4
- Spiritual Transformations: Science, Religion, and Human Becoming - Augsberg Fortress - eBooks Account, 2008, ISBN 0-8006-6320-9
- Video - Beginning Reflections of One Unitarian Universalist on Cloning and Genetic Technologies
