= Chet Raymo =

American writer, educator and naturalist (1936–2026)

- Born: Chester Theodore Raymo Jr. September 17, 1936; Chattanooga, Tennessee, U.S.
- Died: January 25, 2026 (aged 89)
- Occupations: Academic, writer
- Writing career
- Period: 1982–2026
- Genres: Science, nature
- Website: www.sciencemusings.com

Chester Theodore Raymo Jr. (September 17, 1936 – January 25, 2026) was an American writer, educator and naturalist. He was professor emeritus of physics at Stonehill College, in Easton, Massachusetts. His weekly newspaper column "Science Musings" appeared in the Boston Globe for twenty years from 1983 to 2003, now collected and extended with his further writings on his personal website. Raymo espoused his religious naturalism in When God is Gone Everything is Holy – The Making of a Religious Naturalist and frequently in his blog. He said: "I attend to this infinitely mysterious world with reverence, awe, thanksgiving, praise. All religious qualities."

Raymo was a contributor to The Notre Dame Magazine and Scientific American.

Raymo's most famous book is the novel entitled The Dork of Cork, which was made into the feature-length film Frankie Starlight. He is also the author of Walking Zero, a scientific and historical account of his wanderings along the Prime Meridian in Great Britain. He was the recipient of the 1998 Lannan Literary Award for his non-fiction work.

Raymo espoused a scientific skepticism for his beliefs:

For the Religious Naturalist, darkness and silence are not the paradox, they are the resolution. The apophatic tradition ends in effective negation (God is not this, God is not that, God is not). Not only do we fall silent in the face of the Word, the Word itself dissolves into silence. We too walk a fine line; not between skepticism and faith, but between skepticism and cynicism. We try to stay firmly on the side of skepticism, open to whatever winds of wisdom blow our way, and as for knowledge of the world, we cherish the scientific way of knowing—tentative, partial, evolving.

Raymo died on January 25, 2026, at the age of 89.

== Major works ==
- 1982 365 Starry Nights ISBN 0-671-76606-6
- 1984 Biography of a Planet ISBN 0-13-078221-1
- 1985 The Soul of the Night ISBN 1-56101-236-X
- 1987 Honey from Stone ISBN 1-56101-235-1
- 1990 In the Falcon's Claw ISBN 1-56101-287-4
- 1991 The Virgin and the Mousetrap: Essays in Search of the Soul of Science, Viking Books ISBN 0-670-83315-0
- 1993 The Dork of Cork ISBN 0-446-67000-6
- 1998 Skeptics and True Believers ISBN 0-8027-7564-0
- 2000 Natural Prayers ISBN 1-886913-45-5
- 2001 An Intimate Look at the Night Sky ISBN 0-8027-1369-6
- 2003 The Path ISBN 0-8027-1402-1
- 2004 Climbing Brandon ISBN 0-8027-1433-1
- 2005 Valentine ISBN 1-56101-286-6
- 2006 Walking Zero ISBN 0-8027-1494-3
- 2008 When God is Gone, Everything is Holy ISBN 1-933495-13-8
