= Ursula Goodenough =

American biologist (born 1943)

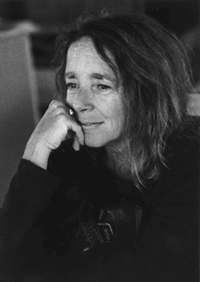
- Goodenough, 1998
- Born: March 16, 1943 (age 83); New York City, New York
- Education: Ph.D. Harvard University (1969); M.A Columbia University (1965); B.A. Barnard College (1963)
- Known for: Algal research, Religious Naturalism, Epic of Evolution
- Scientific career
- Fields: Cell biology
- Institutions: Washington University in St. Louis; Harvard University

Ursula W. Goodenough (born March 16, 1943) is a retired Professor of Biology Emerita at Washington University in St. Louis, where she researched on eukaryotic algae. She authored the textbook Genetics and the best-selling book The Sacred Depths of Nature and speaks regularly about religious naturalist orientation and evolution. She contributed to the NPR blog 13.7: Cosmos & Culture from 2009 to 2011.

She currently serves as president of the Religious Naturalist Association. In 2023, she was elected to the National Academy of Sciences.

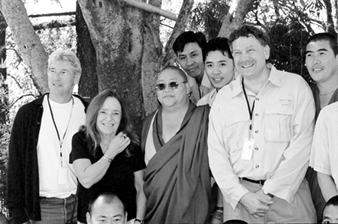
Goodenough in Dharamsala, India, with Richard Gere, Eric Lander and a Buddhist Bhikkhu

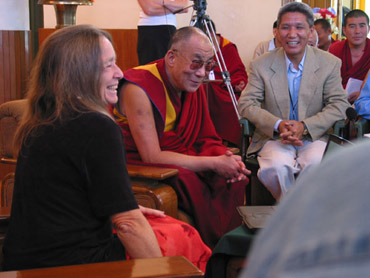
Goodenough in Dharamsala, India, with the Dalai Lama

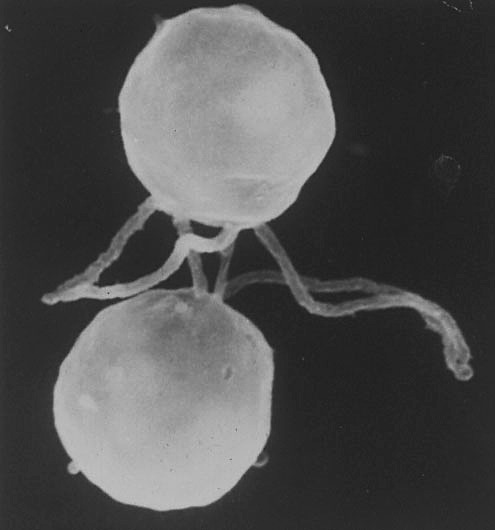
Mating Chlamydomonas

== Background and Education ==
Goodenough, daughter of Erwin Ramsdell Goodenough and Evelyn Goodenough Pitcher, was born on March 16, 1943, in New York City. She earned a B.A. in zoology from Barnard College in 1963, an M.A. in zoology at Columbia University in 1965, and a Ph.D. in biology at Harvard University in 1969. From 1963 to 1964, she was a Eugene Higgins Fellow at Columbia University and later became an NIH Pre-Doctoral Fellow at Columbia and Harvard in 1964–1969. She was an assistant and associate professor of biology at Harvard from 1971 to 1978 before moving to Washington University. She wrote three editions of a widely adopted textbook, Genetics. She served as president of the American Society for Cell Biology in 1984–1985, was elected to the Cellular and Developmental Biology section of the American Academy of Arts and Sciences in 2009, was elected a Fellow of the American Academy of Microbiology in 2013 and was awarded a Doctor of Letters Honoris Causa by the Meadville School of Theology in 2022. Since 2013, Goodenough has been listed on the Advisory Council of the National Center for Science Education.

Goodenough joined the Institute on Religion in an Age of Science (IRAS) in 1989 and has served continuously on its council and as its president for four years. She has presented papers and seminars on science and religion to numerous audiences, co-chaired six IRAS conferences on Star Island, and serves on the editorial board of Zygon: Journal of Religion and Science.

== Family ==
Goodenough has written that women who are balancing the demands of raising children and developing a career need to understand that they can do both. She says that realizing that a child's development is influenced by many people in their lives other than their mother has helped her achieve both her personal and professional goals. She is the mother of five children born in 1970, 1974, 1980, 1982, and 1985, respectively, and she has 9 grandchildren.

Goodenough's brothers are the solid-state physicist John B. Goodenough (1922–2023), who was the oldest recipient of the Nobel Prize at age 97, the anthropologist Ward Goodenough (1919–2013), and the cell biologist Daniel Goodenough (1945–2024).

== Teaching ==
Goodenough was a Professor of Biology at Washington University and taught a junior/senior-level cell biology course for many years. She was also an Associate Professor of Anatomy at the Washington University School of Medicine and an Adjunct Professor of Cell Biology at Mt. Sinai School of Medicine. She also joined physicist Claude Bernard and earth-scientist Michael Wysession for 10 years, teaching a course called The Epic of Evolution, directed at non-science majors. She has also taught graduate-level courses in microbial biology.

== Dalai Lama ==
In 2002, Goodenough was a member of a five-scientist panel invited by the Mind and Life Institute as part of an ongoing series of seminars on Western science for Tenzin Gyatso, the 14th Dalai Lama, and his inner circle of monk scholars. Previous seminars explored particle physics and neuroscience. This was the Dalai Lama's first foray into cellular biology. Goodenough found him a quick study: "He's very interested in science and really wants to understand this stuff. We'd been told that he knew about DNA and proteins, but when I started, it became clear that he had very little background. Of course, one is left to wonder how many of the world's leaders understand DNA and proteins." Goodenough was joined by scientists Stuart Kauffman, Steven Chu, and Eric Lander. Goodenough was invited back to Dharamsala, India, to lecture again in 2003.

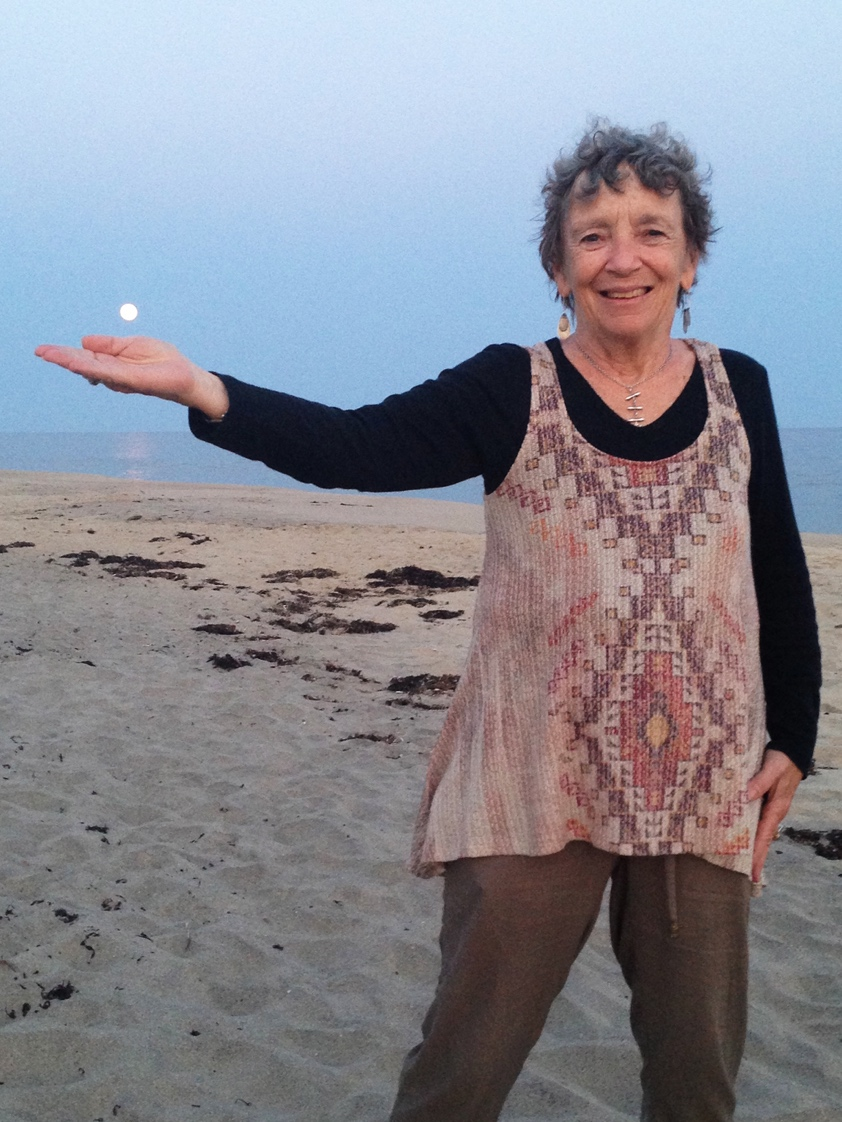
Photo of Goodenough taken in 2014

== Research ==
Goodenough and colleagues have studied the molecular basis and evolution of life-cycle transitions in the flagellated green alga Chlamydomonas reinhardtii. They have identified genes in the mating-type (MT) locus and genes regulated by MT that control the transition between vegetative growth, gametic differentiation, and zygote development. These include genes responsible for mate recognition, uniparental inheritance of chloroplast DNA, and gametic differentiation, allowing analysis of their function and evolution during speciation. They have also purified and sequenced the alga's sexual agglutinins and identified the genes involved in transmitting chloroplast DNA and the sexual signaling pathway via cAMP. Their current interest is in the homeoproteins Gsm1 and Gsp1. In addition, they have established connections between thylakoid organization and photosynthetic capacity and researched the assembly of the green alga's cell walls. They have also elucidated structural features of ciliary motility and explored the potential of forming lipid bodies for producing algal biodiesel as a transportation fuel. Her research also focuses on the molecular genetic specification of sexual traits in pikoeukaryotic algae.

== Religious Naturalist Orientation ==
Goodenough is a prominent advocate of the religious naturalist (RN) orientation, which explores the religious potential of our science-based understanding of nature. In 1998, she wrote a widely-read book on the topic, which has been extensively revised in a new 2023 edition. She also serves as president of the Religious Naturalist Association. Her recent RN presentations are listed here.

== Other activities ==
From 1987 to 1983, she was a member of the Molecular Cytology Study Section and an associate editor of the Journal of Cell Biology. From 1994 to 1998 and 1997 to 2000, she was an associate editor of the Cell Motility and the Cytoskeleton and Journal of Phycology, respectively. In 1988, she was the coordinator of the Meeting on Cell and Molecular Biology of Chlamydomonas at the Cold Spring Harbor Laboratory, and in 1990, she was the coordinator of the Regional Meeting of the American Society for Cell Biology (ASCB) in Chicago. From 1990 to 1993, she was a council member and a member of the Education Committee of the ASCB. In 1992, she became the chair of the Women in Cell Biology Committee and the president of the ASCB from 1994 to 1995. In 1993, she was the chair of the NSF and NASA Committees, and in 1997, she was a member of the FASEB Subcommittee on Ethical Issues of Genetic Research. From 1996 to 1998, she was an adjunct member of Trends in Early Research Careers at the NRC, and in 1996, she became the president of the Phi Beta Kappa at Washington University. In 1999, she was a Phi Beta Kappa Visiting Scholar and a board member of the Science Writers Fellowship Program at the Marine Biological Laboratory. From 2001 to 2003, she was an editor of the Eukaryotic Cell, and from 2003 to 2009, she was the chair of the Women in Cell Biology Committee at the ASCB. In 2002, she was the coordinator of the Meeting on Cell and Molecular Biology of Chlamydomonas in Vancouver, Canada, and in 2012, she was on the editorial board of an Algal Research Project and the Scientific Advisory Committee of the Integrated Microbial Diversity at the Canadian Institute for Advanced Research.

== Public Outreach ==
In 1992, she was a member of the Center of Advanced Study in Religion and Science (CASIRAS), and from 1992 to 1996, she was the President of IRAS. In 1996, she was the IRAS Conference Co-Chair on the "Epic of Evolution" and a member of the Advisory Committee at the AAAS Program of Dialogue Between Science and Religion. In 1998, she was on the Editorial Advisory Board of the Zygon: Journal of Religion and Science, and from 2002-2006, she was the Vice President for Development at IRAS. In 2006, she was the Vice President for Interdisciplinary Affairs at IRAS, and in 2012, she was the Iowa Primate Learning Sanctuary Board Member and Secretary.

== Honors ==
In 1995, Goodenough won the Founder's Day Distinguished Faculty Award from Washington University. She also won the Faculty Teaching Awards from Washington University in 1986 and 1994. In 1999, she won the Senior Career Recognition Award from the American Society for Cell Biology. In 2005, she won the Humanist Pioneer Award from the American Humanist Association. In 2009, she became a Fellow of the American Women in Science and the American Academy of Arts and Sciences. She also became a Fellow of the American Academy of Microbiology in 2013, and in 2017, she became a fellow of the American Society for Cell Biology. In 2022, she earned her Doctor of Letters Honoris Causa from the Meadville School of Theology, and in 2023, she became a member of the National Academy of Sciences.
