= Zygon (journal) =

- Discipline: Religious studies
- Language: English
- Edited by: Arthur C. Petersen

Publication details
- History: 1966–present
- Publisher: Open Library of Humanities
- Frequency: Quarterly
- Impact factor: 0.617 (2016)

Standard abbreviations
- ISO 4: Zygon

Indexing
- ISSN: 0591-2385

Links
- Journal homepage; Online access; Online archive

Zygon: Journal of Religion & Science is a quarterly open access peer-reviewed academic journal covering religion and science published by the Open Library of Humanities. It was established in 1966 and the editor-in-chief is Arthur C. Petersen (University College London). Zygon is sponsored by the Institute on Religion in an Age of Science and the Center for Advanced Study in Religion and Science (CASIRAS).

The name "Zygon" (mod. L., ad. ζυγόν Gr. yoke.), according to the journal founder Ralph Wendell Burhoe, is the Greek term for anything that joins two bodies, especially the yoking or harnessing of a team that must pull together effectively. The Zygon is the symbol of the journal, its aim being to reunite the "split team" of values and knowledge.

According to the Journal Citation Reports, the journal had a 2024 impact factor of 0.6, ranking it 48th out of 69 journals (Q3) in the category "Social Issues". The Scimago Journal & Country Rank 2024 located this Journal in the 1st quartile (Q1) in the categories "Religious Studies" and "Cultural Studies".

Zygon became an open access journal when it moved to the Open Library of Humanities in 2024.
