= Institute on Religion in an Age of Science =

American non-denominational society

The Institute on Religion in an Age of Science (IRAS) is a non-denominational society that promotes and facilitates the ongoing dialectic between religion and science. The Institute has held annual week-long conferences at Star Island in New Hampshire since 1954. The conference attracts about 250 members and non-members each year. The 1964 conference, for example, was attended by 215 conferees, with speeches by figures including Theodosius Dobzhansky.

== Mission ==
In its Constitution, the IRAS purpose is stated as follows: "The Institute on Religion in an Age of Science is established

- to promote creative efforts leading to the formulation, in the light of contemporary knowledge, of effective doctrines and practice for human welfare;
- to formulate dynamic and positive relationships between the concepts developed by science and the goals and hopes of humanity expressed through religion; and
- to state human values in such universal and valid terms that they be understood by all peoples, whatever their cultural background or experience, in such a way as to provide a basis for world-wide cooperation.

The IRAS Council adopted the following statement in 2003: "We at IRAS take the natural world seriously as a primary source of meaning. Our quest is informed and guided by the deepening and evolving understandings fostered by scientific inquiry.

"From here, our quests for meaning take us in divergent directions. For some, the natural world and its emergent manifestations in human experience and creativity are the focus of exploration. Some go on to encounter and celebrate the sacred in such explorations. For others, understandings of the natural world are interwoven with understandings inherent in various religious traditions, generating additional paths of exploration and encounter. As a result, we articulate our emerging orientations with many voices that are harmonious in that we share a common sense of place and gratitude.

"We acknowledge as well a shared set of values and concerns pertaining to peace, justice, dignity, cultural and ecological diversity and planetary sustainability. Although we may differ and hence debate as to how these concerns are here addressed, we are committed to participating in their resolution."

== History ==
IRAS evolved from the ideas of two pioneer groups. The first was a group of scientists from the Committee on Science and Values of the American Academy of Arts and Sciences. The second group was an interfaith, religious coalition which hoped to revitalize religion for today's needs. Members of both groups saw what some perceived as a battlefield of conflicting ideologies to be a place of opportunity for a constructive relationship to emerge. The first president was Edwin Prince Booth, a professor of church history at Boston College (1954–1959). Subsequent presidents included Harlow Shapley, Philip Hefner, Ursula Goodenough, and Varadaraja V. Raman.

In 1954 the scientists accepted an invitation to present their views to the religious group at a seven-day conference on Religion in an Age of Science on Star Island. On November 9, 1954, members of the two groups established the Institute on Religion in an Age of Science to work toward these goals.

== Presidents ==
Presidents of IRAS have been:

- Edwin Prince Booth, (1954–59), Professor of Church History, Boston College
- Harlow Shapley, (1960–62), Professor of Astronomy, Harvard University
- Sanborn C. Brown, (1962–67), Professor of Physics, Massachusetts Institute of Technology
- Malcolm R. Sutherland Jr., (1967–68), President of Meadville/Lombard Theological School
- Carl Bihldorff, (1968–69), Minister, First Parish, Brookline, Massachusetts
- Hudson Hoagland, (1969–71), Director, Worcester Foundation of Experimental Biology
- Jerome Malino, (1971–73), Rabbi, United Jewish Center, Danbury, Connecticut
- Solomon Hines, (1973–75), Professor of Systematic Theology, Hartford Seminary Foundation
- Malcolm R. Sutherland Jr., (1976–77), President of Meadville/Lombard Theological School
- Solomon H. Katz, (1977–79), Professor of Anthropology, University of Pennsylvania
- Philip Hefner, (1979–81), Professor of Theology, Lutheran School of Theology at Chicago
- Elizabeth Ann Cornett, (1981–83), Professor of Anthropology, University of Pennsylvania
- Philip Hefner, (1984–86), Professor of Theology, Lutheran School of Theology at Chicago
- Ward Goodenough, (1987–89), Professor of Anthropology, University of Pennsylvania
- Marjorie Hall Davis, (1989–92), Minister, United Church of Christ, Granby, Connecticut
- Ursula Goodenough, (1992–96), Professor of Biology, Washington University
- Karl E. Peters, (1996–99), Professor of Philosophy and Religion, Rollins College
- Christopher Corbally, (1999–2002), Astronomer, Vatican Observatory
- Michael Cavanaugh, (2002–04), Attorney (retired), Baton Rouge, Louisiana
- Barbara Whittaker-Johns, (2004–05), Minister, Arlington, Massachusetts
- John Teske, (2005–08), Professor, Psychology, Elizabethtown College, Elizabethtown, Pennsylvania
- Ted Laurenson, (2008–11), Attorney, New York, New York
- Varadaraja Raman, (2011–13), Professor of Physics and Humanities, Rochester Institute of Technology
- Barbara Whittaker-Johns, (2013–), Minister, Arlington, Massachusetts

== See also ==
- Zygon (journal)
- European Society for the Study of Science and Theology
