= List of minor planets: 551001–552000 =

The following is a partial list of minor planets, running from minor-planet number 551001 through 552000, inclusive. The primary data for this and other partial lists is based on JPL's "Small-Body Orbital Elements" and data available from the Minor Planet Center. Critical list information is also provided by the MPC, unless otherwise specified from Lowell Observatory. A detailed description of the table's columns and additional sources are given on the main page including a complete list of every page in this series, and a statistical break-up on the dynamical classification of minor planets.

Also see the summary list of all named bodies in numerical and alphabetical order, and the corresponding naming citations for the number range of this particular list. New namings may only be added to this list after official publication, as the preannouncement of names is condemned by the Working Group for Small Bodies Nomenclature of the International Astronomical Union.

Near-Earth obj.	MBA (inner)	MBA (outer)	Centaur
Mars-crosser	MBA (middle)	Jupiter trojan	Trans-Neptunian obj.
Unclassified

== 551001–551100 ==
Designation			Discovery			Properties		Ref
Permanent	Provisional	Named after	Date	Site	Discoverer(s)	Category	Diam.	Ref
551001	2012 UN_{170}	—	September 26, 2012	Nogales	M. Schwartz, P. R. Holvorcem	MAR	1.1 km	MPC · JPL
551002	2012 UY_{170}	—	January 29, 2009	Mount Lemmon	Mount Lemmon Survey	·	2.8 km	MPC · JPL
551003	2012 UY_{173}	—	October 26, 2012	Haleakala	Pan-STARRS 1	·	3.9 km	MPC · JPL
551004	2012 UD_{175}	—	October 18, 2012	Mount Lemmon	Mount Lemmon Survey	·	1.1 km	MPC · JPL
551005	2012 UA_{178}	—	October 11, 2012	Mount Lemmon	Mount Lemmon Survey	·	530 m	MPC · JPL
551006	2012 UX_{178}	—	September 18, 2003	Palomar	NEAT	·	1.5 km	MPC · JPL
551007	2012 UD_{179}	—	April 5, 2011	Kitt Peak	Spacewatch	·	720 m	MPC · JPL
551008	2012 UV_{179}	—	October 21, 2012	Haleakala	Pan-STARRS 1	MAR	870 m	MPC · JPL
551009	2012 UD_{180}	—	January 17, 2005	Kitt Peak	Spacewatch	·	1.3 km	MPC · JPL
551010	2012 UN_{181}	—	October 18, 2012	Haleakala	Pan-STARRS 1	MIS	2.0 km	MPC · JPL
551011	2012 UD_{182}	—	October 19, 2012	Haleakala	Pan-STARRS 1	V	560 m	MPC · JPL
551012	2012 UZ_{183}	—	October 18, 2012	Haleakala	Pan-STARRS 1	·	750 m	MPC · JPL
551013	2012 UL_{185}	—	October 21, 2012	Haleakala	Pan-STARRS 1	·	1.2 km	MPC · JPL
551014 Gorman	2012 UU_{185}	Gorman	October 18, 2012	Piszkéstető	K. Sárneczky, M. Langbroek	(1118)	3.5 km	MPC · JPL
551015	2012 UB_{187}	—	October 19, 2012	Mount Lemmon	Mount Lemmon Survey	·	2.2 km	MPC · JPL
551016	2012 UJ_{187}	—	January 20, 2015	Haleakala	Pan-STARRS 1	·	2.4 km	MPC · JPL
551017	2012 UK_{188}	—	October 19, 2012	Mount Lemmon	Mount Lemmon Survey	·	1.3 km	MPC · JPL
551018	2012 UA_{189}	—	October 16, 2012	Kitt Peak	Spacewatch	·	940 m	MPC · JPL
551019	2012 US_{190}	—	October 20, 2012	Kitt Peak	Spacewatch	·	960 m	MPC · JPL
551020	2012 UB_{191}	—	September 12, 1994	Kitt Peak	Spacewatch	·	850 m	MPC · JPL
551021	2012 UL_{191}	—	February 27, 2014	Haleakala	Pan-STARRS 1	·	1.1 km	MPC · JPL
551022	2012 UW_{191}	—	August 10, 2016	Haleakala	Pan-STARRS 1	·	1.1 km	MPC · JPL
551023	2012 UQ_{192}	—	November 5, 2005	Catalina	CSS	T_{j} (2.82)	2.9 km	MPC · JPL
551024	2012 UA_{193}	—	October 21, 2012	Mount Lemmon	Mount Lemmon Survey	·	780 m	MPC · JPL
551025	2012 UX_{194}	—	October 22, 2012	Nogales	M. Schwartz, P. R. Holvorcem	·	1.0 km	MPC · JPL
551026	2012 UY_{195}	—	October 21, 2012	Haleakala	Pan-STARRS 1	(5)	780 m	MPC · JPL
551027	2012 UR_{196}	—	October 21, 2012	Haleakala	Pan-STARRS 1	PHO	840 m	MPC · JPL
551028	2012 UD_{197}	—	October 23, 2012	Mount Lemmon	Mount Lemmon Survey	·	640 m	MPC · JPL
551029	2012 UD_{202}	—	September 16, 2012	ESA OGS	ESA OGS	MAR	790 m	MPC · JPL
551030	2012 UP_{211}	—	October 17, 2012	Mount Lemmon	Mount Lemmon Survey	·	990 m	MPC · JPL
551031	2012 UW_{212}	—	October 21, 2012	Kitt Peak	Spacewatch	·	2.7 km	MPC · JPL
551032	2012 UQ_{215}	—	October 25, 2012	Kitt Peak	Spacewatch	·	1.0 km	MPC · JPL
551033	2012 UK_{216}	—	October 16, 2012	Mount Lemmon	Mount Lemmon Survey	·	1.0 km	MPC · JPL
551034	2012 UQ_{216}	—	October 21, 2012	Mount Lemmon	Mount Lemmon Survey	·	1.3 km	MPC · JPL
551035	2012 UV_{216}	—	October 21, 2012	Mount Lemmon	Mount Lemmon Survey	·	2.7 km	MPC · JPL
551036	2012 UU_{217}	—	October 22, 2012	Haleakala	Pan-STARRS 1	·	1.3 km	MPC · JPL
551037	2012 UA_{218}	—	October 22, 2012	Mount Lemmon	Mount Lemmon Survey	·	1.2 km	MPC · JPL
551038	2012 UG_{218}	—	October 20, 2012	Haleakala	Pan-STARRS 1	·	880 m	MPC · JPL
551039	2012 US_{221}	—	October 18, 2012	Haleakala	Pan-STARRS 1	·	980 m	MPC · JPL
551040	2012 VM_{2}	—	April 14, 2010	Mount Lemmon	Mount Lemmon Survey	PHO	650 m	MPC · JPL
551041	2012 VB_{7}	—	October 26, 2012	Haleakala	Pan-STARRS 1	H	440 m	MPC · JPL
551042	2012 VC_{8}	—	October 8, 2008	Mount Lemmon	Mount Lemmon Survey	·	920 m	MPC · JPL
551043	2012 VC_{10}	—	October 11, 2006	Palomar	NEAT	(1118)	4.7 km	MPC · JPL
551044	2012 VP_{11}	—	November 4, 2012	Mount Lemmon	Mount Lemmon Survey	·	2.5 km	MPC · JPL
551045	2012 VB_{12}	—	October 18, 2012	Haleakala	Pan-STARRS 1	·	910 m	MPC · JPL
551046	2012 VU_{15}	—	February 13, 2002	Apache Point	SDSS Collaboration	·	4.5 km	MPC · JPL
551047	2012 VD_{16}	—	October 22, 2012	Kitt Peak	Spacewatch	·	2.8 km	MPC · JPL
551048	2012 VF_{16}	—	May 22, 2011	Mount Lemmon	Mount Lemmon Survey	H	430 m	MPC · JPL
551049	2012 VO_{16}	—	October 18, 2001	Palomar	NEAT	·	1.0 km	MPC · JPL
551050	2012 VR_{16}	—	September 15, 2003	Palomar	NEAT	·	1.6 km	MPC · JPL
551051	2012 VM_{17}	—	October 21, 2012	Haleakala	Pan-STARRS 1	·	880 m	MPC · JPL
551052	2012 VX_{17}	—	January 31, 2006	Kitt Peak	Spacewatch	·	920 m	MPC · JPL
551053	2012 VB_{24}	—	October 15, 2012	Kitt Peak	Spacewatch	MAS	540 m	MPC · JPL
551054	2012 VT_{24}	—	October 8, 2012	Kitt Peak	Spacewatch	URS	3.2 km	MPC · JPL
551055	2012 VM_{25}	—	September 29, 2005	Mount Lemmon	Mount Lemmon Survey	·	880 m	MPC · JPL
551056	2012 VV_{27}	—	October 22, 2005	Kitt Peak	Spacewatch	V	510 m	MPC · JPL
551057	2012 VA_{33}	—	October 25, 2005	Kitt Peak	Spacewatch	·	680 m	MPC · JPL
551058	2012 VT_{33}	—	July 5, 2003	Kitt Peak	Spacewatch	·	1.7 km	MPC · JPL
551059	2012 VF_{35}	—	October 17, 2012	Mount Lemmon	Mount Lemmon Survey	·	880 m	MPC · JPL
551060	2012 VX_{35}	—	October 20, 2012	Mount Lemmon	Mount Lemmon Survey	·	870 m	MPC · JPL
551061	2012 VY_{37}	—	November 20, 2008	Mount Lemmon	Mount Lemmon Survey	·	1.1 km	MPC · JPL
551062	2012 VG_{38}	—	December 24, 2005	Kitt Peak	Spacewatch	T_{j} (2.97) · 3:2	3.9 km	MPC · JPL
551063	2012 VQ_{41}	—	April 15, 2010	Mount Lemmon	Mount Lemmon Survey	·	3.0 km	MPC · JPL
551064	2012 VR_{43}	—	November 2, 2012	Mount Lemmon	Mount Lemmon Survey	EOS	1.8 km	MPC · JPL
551065	2012 VJ_{45}	—	September 7, 2008	Mount Lemmon	Mount Lemmon Survey	·	1.3 km	MPC · JPL
551066	2012 VM_{46}	—	May 14, 2005	Mount Lemmon	Mount Lemmon Survey	·	2.1 km	MPC · JPL
551067	2012 VW_{47}	—	November 6, 2012	Mount Lemmon	Mount Lemmon Survey	·	3.3 km	MPC · JPL
551068	2012 VH_{49}	—	August 13, 2006	Palomar	NEAT	TIR	2.6 km	MPC · JPL
551069	2012 VQ_{50}	—	March 16, 2004	Kitt Peak	Spacewatch	·	680 m	MPC · JPL
551070	2012 VO_{56}	—	October 8, 2012	Kitt Peak	Spacewatch	·	950 m	MPC · JPL
551071	2012 VK_{57}	—	October 20, 2012	Kitt Peak	Spacewatch	·	650 m	MPC · JPL
551072	2012 VC_{58}	—	October 21, 2012	Haleakala	Pan-STARRS 1	VER	2.6 km	MPC · JPL
551073	2012 VC_{62}	—	December 28, 2005	Kitt Peak	Spacewatch	·	730 m	MPC · JPL
551074	2012 VE_{62}	—	August 31, 2005	Palomar	NEAT	·	630 m	MPC · JPL
551075	2012 VU_{63}	—	October 22, 2012	Haleakala	Pan-STARRS 1	·	2.6 km	MPC · JPL
551076	2012 VV_{63}	—	December 26, 2005	Kitt Peak	Spacewatch	·	750 m	MPC · JPL
551077	2012 VX_{63}	—	October 18, 2012	Haleakala	Pan-STARRS 1	·	1.2 km	MPC · JPL
551078	2012 VD_{64}	—	November 12, 2012	Mount Lemmon	Mount Lemmon Survey	V	540 m	MPC · JPL
551079	2012 VP_{68}	—	October 25, 2001	Apache Point	SDSS	·	2.0 km	MPC · JPL
551080	2012 VD_{74}	—	January 23, 2006	Kitt Peak	Spacewatch	·	860 m	MPC · JPL
551081	2012 VT_{77}	—	October 20, 2012	Mount Lemmon	Mount Lemmon Survey	·	680 m	MPC · JPL
551082 Tsiongtiong	2012 VD_{78}	Tsiongtiong	October 20, 2012	Haleakala	Pan-STARRS 1	·	700 m	MPC · JPL
551083	2012 VG_{79}	—	September 11, 2005	Kitt Peak	Spacewatch	·	590 m	MPC · JPL
551084	2012 VM_{79}	—	February 17, 2010	Mount Lemmon	Mount Lemmon Survey	MAS	780 m	MPC · JPL
551085	2012 VQ_{81}	—	October 17, 2012	Mount Lemmon	Mount Lemmon Survey	VER	2.9 km	MPC · JPL
551086	2012 VP_{85}	—	October 12, 2012	Oukaïmeden	C. Rinner	·	1.1 km	MPC · JPL
551087	2012 VR_{91}	—	November 14, 2012	Kitt Peak	Spacewatch	·	1.4 km	MPC · JPL
551088	2012 VB_{93}	—	January 29, 2003	Apache Point	SDSS Collaboration	·	940 m	MPC · JPL
551089	2012 VP_{96}	—	October 24, 2001	Palomar	NEAT	·	1.1 km	MPC · JPL
551090	2012 VJ_{98}	—	January 21, 2006	Mount Lemmon	Mount Lemmon Survey	NYS	990 m	MPC · JPL
551091 Flórferenc	2012 VZ_{98}	Flórferenc	October 22, 2012	Piszkéstető	K. Sárneczky, G. Hodosán	·	3.0 km	MPC · JPL
551092	2012 VH_{99}	—	March 27, 2003	Kitt Peak	Spacewatch	T_{j} (2.99)	2.4 km	MPC · JPL
551093	2012 VY_{101}	—	September 11, 2001	Kitt Peak	Spacewatch	·	830 m	MPC · JPL
551094	2012 VS_{106}	—	October 14, 2012	Kitt Peak	Spacewatch	·	2.8 km	MPC · JPL
551095	2012 VW_{106}	—	October 22, 2012	Haleakala	Pan-STARRS 1	·	1.3 km	MPC · JPL
551096	2012 VK_{107}	—	December 29, 2008	Mount Lemmon	Mount Lemmon Survey	·	1.2 km	MPC · JPL
551097	2012 VK_{115}	—	September 30, 2011	Haleakala	Pan-STARRS 1	·	2.8 km	MPC · JPL
551098	2012 VL_{115}	—	November 14, 2012	Kitt Peak	Spacewatch	·	1.2 km	MPC · JPL
551099	2012 VS_{115}	—	November 12, 2012	Mount Lemmon	Mount Lemmon Survey	·	1.0 km	MPC · JPL
551100	2012 VG_{116}	—	November 7, 2012	Nogales	M. Schwartz, P. R. Holvorcem	·	1.8 km	MPC · JPL

== 551101–551200 ==
back to top

Designation			Discovery			Properties		Ref
Permanent	Provisional	Named after	Date	Site	Discoverer(s)	Category	Diam.	Ref
551101	2012 VS_{116}	—	November 13, 2012	Mount Lemmon	Mount Lemmon Survey	·	1.1 km	MPC · JPL
551102	2012 VY_{116}	—	September 30, 2006	Catalina	CSS	·	2.9 km	MPC · JPL
551103	2012 VA_{118}	—	November 2, 2012	Catalina	CSS	·	880 m	MPC · JPL
551104	2012 VU_{118}	—	November 13, 2012	Kitt Peak	Spacewatch	(1547)	1.4 km	MPC · JPL
551105	2012 VP_{121}	—	November 14, 2012	Mount Lemmon	Mount Lemmon Survey	·	2.0 km	MPC · JPL
551106	2012 VM_{122}	—	November 13, 2012	Mount Lemmon	Mount Lemmon Survey	H	400 m	MPC · JPL
551107	2012 VE_{127}	—	November 13, 2012	Mount Lemmon	Mount Lemmon Survey	·	1.4 km	MPC · JPL
551108	2012 VK_{127}	—	November 13, 2012	Mount Lemmon	Mount Lemmon Survey	·	680 m	MPC · JPL
551109	2012 WG_{3}	—	September 23, 2008	Mount Lemmon	Mount Lemmon Survey	·	1.1 km	MPC · JPL
551110	2012 WV_{4}	—	October 7, 2005	Mauna Kea	A. Boattini	NYS	1.0 km	MPC · JPL
551111	2012 WF_{8}	—	June 26, 2011	Mount Lemmon	Mount Lemmon Survey	HNS	1.2 km	MPC · JPL
551112	2012 WR_{9}	—	November 19, 2012	Kitt Peak	Spacewatch	·	980 m	MPC · JPL
551113	2012 WL_{11}	—	November 16, 2001	Kitt Peak	Spacewatch	·	3.9 km	MPC · JPL
551114	2012 WM_{11}	—	October 22, 2012	Mount Lemmon	Mount Lemmon Survey	CLA	1.2 km	MPC · JPL
551115	2012 WM_{17}	—	November 6, 2012	Kitt Peak	Spacewatch	·	1.0 km	MPC · JPL
551116	2012 WH_{19}	—	November 6, 2012	Kitt Peak	Spacewatch	·	840 m	MPC · JPL
551117	2012 WT_{19}	—	October 8, 2008	Kitt Peak	Spacewatch	V	680 m	MPC · JPL
551118	2012 WJ_{21}	—	November 13, 2002	Palomar	NEAT	·	760 m	MPC · JPL
551119	2012 WQ_{24}	—	November 23, 2012	Oukaïmeden	C. Rinner	·	1.2 km	MPC · JPL
551120	2012 WA_{26}	—	December 30, 2008	Mount Lemmon	Mount Lemmon Survey	·	990 m	MPC · JPL
551121	2012 WW_{28}	—	November 20, 2012	Mount Lemmon	Mount Lemmon Survey	·	660 m	MPC · JPL
551122	2012 WO_{31}	—	November 7, 2012	Haleakala	Pan-STARRS 1	LIX	3.6 km	MPC · JPL
551123	2012 WY_{35}	—	November 19, 2012	Kitt Peak	Spacewatch	·	1.1 km	MPC · JPL
551124	2012 WE_{36}	—	October 27, 2005	Mount Lemmon	Mount Lemmon Survey	·	1.0 km	MPC · JPL
551125	2012 WU_{36}	—	November 26, 2012	Mount Lemmon	Mount Lemmon Survey	·	1.1 km	MPC · JPL
551126	2012 WU_{39}	—	September 25, 2016	Haleakala	Pan-STARRS 1	·	1.3 km	MPC · JPL
551127	2012 WE_{42}	—	November 20, 2012	Mount Lemmon	Mount Lemmon Survey	ADE	1.9 km	MPC · JPL
551128	2012 XE	—	November 26, 2012	Mount Lemmon	Mount Lemmon Survey	H	430 m	MPC · JPL
551129	2012 XG_{1}	—	September 4, 2011	Kitt Peak	Spacewatch	·	3.2 km	MPC · JPL
551130	2012 XS_{2}	—	November 6, 2012	Kitt Peak	Spacewatch	·	2.0 km	MPC · JPL
551131	2012 XM_{3}	—	November 23, 2012	Kitt Peak	Spacewatch	·	900 m	MPC · JPL
551132	2012 XX_{3}	—	May 19, 1993	Kitt Peak	Spacewatch	·	3.1 km	MPC · JPL
551133	2012 XW_{5}	—	December 4, 2012	Mount Lemmon	Mount Lemmon Survey	H	490 m	MPC · JPL
551134	2012 XO_{6}	—	June 18, 2006	Palomar	NEAT	·	1.9 km	MPC · JPL
551135	2012 XA_{7}	—	November 12, 2012	Kitt Peak	Spacewatch	H	490 m	MPC · JPL
551136	2012 XY_{14}	—	October 1, 2005	Kitt Peak	Spacewatch	·	3.4 km	MPC · JPL
551137	2012 XE_{16}	—	November 5, 2012	Nogales	M. Schwartz, P. R. Holvorcem	·	1.8 km	MPC · JPL
551138	2012 XZ_{16}	—	January 11, 2008	Mount Lemmon	Mount Lemmon Survey	H	410 m	MPC · JPL
551139	2012 XW_{21}	—	September 11, 2007	Mount Lemmon	Mount Lemmon Survey	·	1.3 km	MPC · JPL
551140	2012 XZ_{28}	—	October 8, 2008	Mount Lemmon	Mount Lemmon Survey	·	1.1 km	MPC · JPL
551141	2012 XU_{32}	—	November 24, 2012	Kitt Peak	Spacewatch	·	1.3 km	MPC · JPL
551142	2012 XL_{40}	—	October 9, 2008	Mount Lemmon	Mount Lemmon Survey	V	520 m	MPC · JPL
551143	2012 XW_{40}	—	December 22, 2008	Kitt Peak	Spacewatch	MIS	2.0 km	MPC · JPL
551144	2012 XG_{41}	—	December 3, 2012	Mount Lemmon	Mount Lemmon Survey	·	1.4 km	MPC · JPL
551145	2012 XL_{42}	—	January 2, 2009	Mount Lemmon	Mount Lemmon Survey	·	1 km	MPC · JPL
551146	2012 XH_{44}	—	November 22, 2012	Nogales	M. Schwartz, P. R. Holvorcem	·	1.2 km	MPC · JPL
551147	2012 XD_{45}	—	October 15, 2007	Mount Lemmon	Mount Lemmon Survey	·	1.5 km	MPC · JPL
551148	2012 XY_{48}	—	December 17, 2001	Socorro	LINEAR	·	1.2 km	MPC · JPL
551149	2012 XV_{50}	—	October 16, 2012	Kitt Peak	Spacewatch	·	2.6 km	MPC · JPL
551150	2012 XP_{52}	—	October 22, 2003	Apache Point	SDSS	·	1.1 km	MPC · JPL
551151	2012 XV_{52}	—	November 20, 2003	Palomar	NEAT	·	1.8 km	MPC · JPL
551152	2012 XU_{54}	—	April 12, 2011	Mount Lemmon	Mount Lemmon Survey	H	490 m	MPC · JPL
551153	2012 XR_{55}	—	December 9, 2012	Mount Lemmon	Mount Lemmon Survey	·	1.8 km	MPC · JPL
551154	2012 XE_{56}	—	January 31, 2003	Palomar	NEAT	H	600 m	MPC · JPL
551155	2012 XL_{56}	—	December 10, 2012	Haleakala	Pan-STARRS 1	H	460 m	MPC · JPL
551156	2012 XR_{62}	—	December 21, 2008	Mount Lemmon	Mount Lemmon Survey	·	1.5 km	MPC · JPL
551157	2012 XV_{63}	—	June 5, 2011	Mount Lemmon	Mount Lemmon Survey	·	1.2 km	MPC · JPL
551158	2012 XZ_{66}	—	December 4, 2012	Mount Lemmon	Mount Lemmon Survey	·	1.4 km	MPC · JPL
551159	2012 XF_{67}	—	November 15, 2012	Nogales	M. Schwartz, P. R. Holvorcem	(194)	1.7 km	MPC · JPL
551160	2012 XK_{67}	—	December 4, 2012	Mount Lemmon	Mount Lemmon Survey	(5)	1.1 km	MPC · JPL
551161	2012 XU_{68}	—	September 5, 2008	Kitt Peak	Spacewatch	·	920 m	MPC · JPL
551162	2012 XX_{68}	—	December 5, 2012	Mount Lemmon	Mount Lemmon Survey	·	910 m	MPC · JPL
551163	2012 XL_{70}	—	January 11, 2008	Mount Lemmon	Mount Lemmon Survey	VER	3.0 km	MPC · JPL
551164	2012 XV_{70}	—	September 28, 2008	Mount Lemmon	Mount Lemmon Survey	·	920 m	MPC · JPL
551165	2012 XT_{75}	—	November 7, 2012	Mount Lemmon	Mount Lemmon Survey	·	960 m	MPC · JPL
551166	2012 XP_{78}	—	December 6, 2012	Mount Lemmon	Mount Lemmon Survey	·	1.1 km	MPC · JPL
551167	2012 XH_{79}	—	November 7, 2012	Kitt Peak	Spacewatch	·	920 m	MPC · JPL
551168	2012 XQ_{82}	—	July 11, 2005	Mount Lemmon	Mount Lemmon Survey	·	2.8 km	MPC · JPL
551169	2012 XX_{87}	—	December 8, 2012	Mount Lemmon	Mount Lemmon Survey	·	690 m	MPC · JPL
551170	2012 XY_{87}	—	December 8, 2012	Mount Lemmon	Mount Lemmon Survey	·	3.1 km	MPC · JPL
551171	2012 XB_{91}	—	December 8, 2012	Mount Lemmon	Mount Lemmon Survey	·	2.9 km	MPC · JPL
551172	2012 XC_{98}	—	December 30, 2008	Kitt Peak	Spacewatch	·	960 m	MPC · JPL
551173	2012 XA_{100}	—	December 5, 2012	Mount Lemmon	Mount Lemmon Survey	PHO	940 m	MPC · JPL
551174	2012 XU_{100}	—	March 13, 2010	Mount Lemmon	Mount Lemmon Survey	·	820 m	MPC · JPL
551175	2012 XF_{101}	—	September 15, 2007	Kitt Peak	Spacewatch	·	1.4 km	MPC · JPL
551176	2012 XG_{103}	—	November 12, 2012	Nogales	M. Schwartz, P. R. Holvorcem	HNS	1.7 km	MPC · JPL
551177	2012 XR_{108}	—	December 8, 2012	Mount Lemmon	Mount Lemmon Survey	AGN	870 m	MPC · JPL
551178	2012 XZ_{108}	—	October 11, 2007	Mount Lemmon	Mount Lemmon Survey	·	1.6 km	MPC · JPL
551179	2012 XJ_{113}	—	September 14, 2007	Mount Lemmon	Mount Lemmon Survey	·	1.5 km	MPC · JPL
551180	2012 XA_{116}	—	December 7, 2012	Haleakala	Pan-STARRS 1	·	1.1 km	MPC · JPL
551181	2012 XC_{118}	—	September 29, 1992	Kitt Peak	Spacewatch	·	1.5 km	MPC · JPL
551182	2012 XD_{118}	—	December 8, 2012	Kitt Peak	Spacewatch	HNS	1.1 km	MPC · JPL
551183	2012 XO_{118}	—	December 8, 2012	Kitt Peak	Spacewatch	BAR	810 m	MPC · JPL
551184	2012 XX_{124}	—	February 16, 2010	Mount Lemmon	Mount Lemmon Survey	·	1.3 km	MPC · JPL
551185	2012 XW_{132}	—	December 12, 2012	Catalina	CSS	H	610 m	MPC · JPL
551186	2012 XY_{133}	—	November 24, 2008	Mount Lemmon	Mount Lemmon Survey	·	980 m	MPC · JPL
551187	2012 XF_{134}	—	December 12, 2012	Haleakala	Pan-STARRS 1	H	400 m	MPC · JPL
551188	2012 XC_{136}	—	December 8, 2012	Kitt Peak	Spacewatch	fast	1.2 km	MPC · JPL
551189	2012 XN_{137}	—	December 6, 2012	Nogales	M. Schwartz, P. R. Holvorcem	·	1.6 km	MPC · JPL
551190	2012 XU_{137}	—	October 9, 2012	Mount Lemmon	Mount Lemmon Survey	·	730 m	MPC · JPL
551191	2012 XH_{138}	—	December 3, 2012	Mount Lemmon	Mount Lemmon Survey	H	440 m	MPC · JPL
551192	2012 XL_{138}	—	February 7, 1997	Kitt Peak	Spacewatch	EUN	1.6 km	MPC · JPL
551193	2012 XY_{141}	—	October 20, 2008	Mount Lemmon	Mount Lemmon Survey	·	810 m	MPC · JPL
551194	2012 XN_{147}	—	January 1, 2009	Kitt Peak	Spacewatch	·	1.5 km	MPC · JPL
551195	2012 XX_{147}	—	October 15, 2001	Kitt Peak	Spacewatch	·	860 m	MPC · JPL
551196	2012 XY_{147}	—	November 24, 2008	Kitt Peak	Spacewatch	·	1.1 km	MPC · JPL
551197	2012 XQ_{149}	—	May 29, 2011	Mount Lemmon	Mount Lemmon Survey	H	470 m	MPC · JPL
551198	2012 XT_{150}	—	September 29, 2008	Mount Lemmon	Mount Lemmon Survey	·	2.0 km	MPC · JPL
551199	2012 XF_{155}	—	July 29, 2008	Kitt Peak	Spacewatch	·	880 m	MPC · JPL
551200	2012 XR_{156}	—	July 19, 2001	Palomar	NEAT	·	1.1 km	MPC · JPL

== 551201–551300 ==
back to top

Designation			Discovery			Properties		Ref
Permanent	Provisional	Named after	Date	Site	Discoverer(s)	Category	Diam.	Ref
551201	2012 XO_{157}	—	December 8, 2012	Mount Lemmon	Mount Lemmon Survey	·	1.2 km	MPC · JPL
551202	2012 XA_{162}	—	December 8, 2012	Mount Lemmon	Mount Lemmon Survey	·	1.1 km	MPC · JPL
551203	2012 XF_{165}	—	April 29, 2014	Haleakala	Pan-STARRS 1	V	570 m	MPC · JPL
551204	2012 XG_{165}	—	October 28, 2016	Haleakala	Pan-STARRS 1	·	1.1 km	MPC · JPL
551205	2012 XF_{168}	—	June 11, 2016	Mount Lemmon	Mount Lemmon Survey	·	2.6 km	MPC · JPL
551206	2012 YB_{1}	—	December 18, 2012	Calar Alto-CASADO	Mottola, S.	·	840 m	MPC · JPL
551207	2012 YM_{1}	—	November 2, 2008	Mount Lemmon	Mount Lemmon Survey	·	1.6 km	MPC · JPL
551208	2012 YE_{3}	—	December 7, 2012	Haleakala	Pan-STARRS 1	H	410 m	MPC · JPL
551209	2012 YC_{4}	—	December 13, 2012	Haleakala	Pan-STARRS 1	H	360 m	MPC · JPL
551210	2012 YY_{4}	—	December 22, 2012	Haleakala	Pan-STARRS 1	·	2.1 km	MPC · JPL
551211	2012 YQ_{5}	—	December 7, 1999	Socorro	LINEAR	H	570 m	MPC · JPL
551212 Mathieuudriot	2012 YL_{6}	Mathieuudriot	December 21, 2012	Calar Alto	Hellmich, S.	·	2.6 km	MPC · JPL
551213	2012 YA_{7}	—	October 6, 2012	Haleakala	Pan-STARRS 1	·	1.6 km	MPC · JPL
551214	2012 YX_{7}	—	August 15, 2001	Haleakala	NEAT	H	620 m	MPC · JPL
551215	2012 YS_{9}	—	September 16, 2009	Kitt Peak	Spacewatch	L4	5.9 km	MPC · JPL
551216	2012 YE_{10}	—	November 12, 2007	Mount Lemmon	Mount Lemmon Survey	MRX	820 m	MPC · JPL
551217	2012 YT_{12}	—	December 22, 2012	Haleakala	Pan-STARRS 1	EUN	940 m	MPC · JPL
551218	2012 YB_{13}	—	December 23, 2012	Haleakala	Pan-STARRS 1	L4	7.7 km	MPC · JPL
551219	2012 YJ_{13}	—	July 24, 2015	Haleakala	Pan-STARRS 1	·	820 m	MPC · JPL
551220	2012 YY_{15}	—	January 31, 2016	Haleakala	Pan-STARRS 1	H	400 m	MPC · JPL
551221	2012 YN_{20}	—	December 22, 2012	Haleakala	Pan-STARRS 1	·	1.2 km	MPC · JPL
551222	2013 AP_{3}	—	December 9, 2012	Mount Lemmon	Mount Lemmon Survey	H	390 m	MPC · JPL
551223	2013 AO_{5}	—	December 3, 2012	Mount Lemmon	Mount Lemmon Survey	(5)	1.2 km	MPC · JPL
551224	2013 AP_{6}	—	October 30, 2008	Mount Lemmon	Mount Lemmon Survey	·	910 m	MPC · JPL
551225	2013 AF_{8}	—	January 3, 2013	Mount Lemmon	Mount Lemmon Survey	·	1.1 km	MPC · JPL
551226	2013 AY_{13}	—	January 3, 2013	Mount Lemmon	Mount Lemmon Survey	NYS	930 m	MPC · JPL
551227	2013 AJ_{14}	—	October 8, 2008	Mount Lemmon	Mount Lemmon Survey	(2076)	700 m	MPC · JPL
551228	2013 AR_{17}	—	March 4, 2006	Kitt Peak	Spacewatch	·	1.0 km	MPC · JPL
551229	2013 AD_{21}	—	January 3, 2013	Haleakala	Pan-STARRS 1	·	1.3 km	MPC · JPL
551230	2013 AS_{21}	—	August 23, 2003	Palomar	NEAT	·	1.4 km	MPC · JPL
551231 Żywiec	2013 AT_{24}	Żywiec	January 4, 2013	Tincana	M. Kusiak, M. Żołnowski	PHO	660 m	MPC · JPL
551232	2013 AJ_{26}	—	January 5, 2013	Mount Lemmon	Mount Lemmon Survey	V	470 m	MPC · JPL
551233 Miguelanton	2013 AN_{27}	Miguelanton	August 23, 2006	Pla D'Arguines	R. Ferrando, Ferrando, M.	H	570 m	MPC · JPL
551234	2013 AV_{27}	—	January 1, 2013	Haleakala	Pan-STARRS 1	PHO	930 m	MPC · JPL
551235	2013 AP_{29}	—	November 25, 2000	Kitt Peak	Spacewatch	NYS	1.2 km	MPC · JPL
551236	2013 AZ_{29}	—	April 4, 2002	Palomar	NEAT	·	1.4 km	MPC · JPL
551237	2013 AL_{30}	—	September 5, 1999	Kitt Peak	Spacewatch	·	1.3 km	MPC · JPL
551238	2013 AX_{31}	—	September 23, 2001	Palomar	NEAT	H	580 m	MPC · JPL
551239	2013 AF_{33}	—	January 3, 2013	Haleakala	Pan-STARRS 1	H	470 m	MPC · JPL
551240	2013 AD_{37}	—	December 21, 2012	Catalina	CSS	BAR	1.1 km	MPC · JPL
551241	2013 AO_{37}	—	November 1, 2008	Mount Lemmon	Mount Lemmon Survey	NYS	830 m	MPC · JPL
551242	2013 AW_{38}	—	January 5, 2013	Kitt Peak	Spacewatch	MAS	540 m	MPC · JPL
551243	2013 AP_{40}	—	January 5, 2013	Kitt Peak	Spacewatch	·	930 m	MPC · JPL
551244	2013 AD_{41}	—	December 4, 2008	Kitt Peak	Spacewatch	·	870 m	MPC · JPL
551245	2013 AS_{42}	—	January 5, 2013	Kitt Peak	Spacewatch	NYS	1.1 km	MPC · JPL
551246	2013 AR_{44}	—	September 29, 2003	Kitt Peak	Spacewatch	·	1.4 km	MPC · JPL
551247	2013 AV_{48}	—	October 21, 2008	Kitt Peak	Spacewatch	·	1.1 km	MPC · JPL
551248	2013 AU_{50}	—	May 26, 2011	Nogales	M. Schwartz, P. R. Holvorcem	H	590 m	MPC · JPL
551249	2013 AA_{55}	—	January 5, 2013	Mount Lemmon	Mount Lemmon Survey	·	700 m	MPC · JPL
551250	2013 AD_{56}	—	December 2, 2005	Mauna Kea	A. Boattini	·	1.3 km	MPC · JPL
551251	2013 AN_{56}	—	September 14, 2007	Kitt Peak	Spacewatch	·	1.2 km	MPC · JPL
551252	2013 AO_{58}	—	January 6, 2013	Kitt Peak	Spacewatch	·	810 m	MPC · JPL
551253	2013 AQ_{58}	—	April 26, 2006	Cerro Tololo	Deep Ecliptic Survey	NYS	1.1 km	MPC · JPL
551254	2013 AR_{58}	—	March 7, 2002	Siding Spring	R. H. McNaught	MAS	720 m	MPC · JPL
551255	2013 AG_{60}	—	January 10, 2013	Haleakala	Pan-STARRS 1	T_{j} (2.68)	3.7 km	MPC · JPL
551256	2013 AT_{62}	—	December 9, 2012	Piszkéstető	K. Sárneczky	·	1.6 km	MPC · JPL
551257	2013 AG_{65}	—	June 4, 2011	Kitt Peak	Spacewatch	HNS	1.7 km	MPC · JPL
551258	2013 AZ_{65}	—	January 6, 2013	Mount Lemmon	Mount Lemmon Survey	·	1.4 km	MPC · JPL
551259	2013 AB_{67}	—	December 11, 2012	Nogales	M. Schwartz, P. R. Holvorcem	H	720 m	MPC · JPL
551260	2013 AG_{67}	—	October 22, 2008	Kitt Peak	Spacewatch	·	1.5 km	MPC · JPL
551261	2013 AA_{68}	—	September 4, 2011	Haleakala	Pan-STARRS 1	DOR	2.4 km	MPC · JPL
551262	2013 AE_{68}	—	December 23, 2012	Haleakala	Pan-STARRS 1	L4	7.9 km	MPC · JPL
551263	2013 AN_{68}	—	January 11, 2013	Haleakala	Pan-STARRS 1	H	470 m	MPC · JPL
551264	2013 AP_{70}	—	July 25, 2006	Mount Lemmon	Mount Lemmon Survey	·	2.1 km	MPC · JPL
551265	2013 AW_{71}	—	December 8, 1996	Kitt Peak	Spacewatch	·	1.8 km	MPC · JPL
551266	2013 AY_{72}	—	November 15, 2012	Charleston	R. Holmes	H	480 m	MPC · JPL
551267	2013 AE_{73}	—	January 7, 2013	Kitt Peak	Spacewatch	·	1.1 km	MPC · JPL
551268	2013 AM_{76}	—	January 14, 2013	Catalina	CSS	·	380 m	MPC · JPL
551269	2013 AT_{77}	—	November 9, 1999	Socorro	LINEAR	·	1.0 km	MPC · JPL
551270	2013 AX_{77}	—	August 28, 2006	Catalina	CSS	·	2.2 km	MPC · JPL
551271	2013 AE_{86}	—	October 11, 2007	Kitt Peak	Spacewatch	·	1.4 km	MPC · JPL
551272	2013 AK_{86}	—	February 21, 2006	Mount Lemmon	Mount Lemmon Survey	MAS	710 m	MPC · JPL
551273	2013 AN_{87}	—	October 23, 2001	Palomar	NEAT	·	950 m	MPC · JPL
551274	2013 AL_{88}	—	November 4, 2007	Kitt Peak	Spacewatch	HOF	2.2 km	MPC · JPL
551275	2013 AG_{89}	—	January 4, 2013	Kitt Peak	Spacewatch	H	360 m	MPC · JPL
551276	2013 AH_{91}	—	October 13, 2010	Mount Lemmon	Mount Lemmon Survey	L4	6.7 km	MPC · JPL
551277	2013 AV_{92}	—	April 8, 2006	Kitt Peak	Spacewatch	NYS	960 m	MPC · JPL
551278	2013 AX_{92}	—	October 23, 2008	Kitt Peak	Spacewatch	·	1.0 km	MPC · JPL
551279	2013 AF_{94}	—	November 1, 2010	Mount Lemmon	Mount Lemmon Survey	L4	10 km	MPC · JPL
551280	2013 AT_{94}	—	July 26, 2003	Palomar	NEAT	·	1.9 km	MPC · JPL
551281	2013 AQ_{96}	—	July 24, 2007	Lulin	LUSS	·	1.5 km	MPC · JPL
551282	2013 AH_{97}	—	November 10, 2004	Kitt Peak	Deep Ecliptic Survey	MAS	770 m	MPC · JPL
551283	2013 AT_{98}	—	April 20, 2006	Kitt Peak	Spacewatch	·	1.5 km	MPC · JPL
551284	2013 AR_{100}	—	January 9, 2013	Kitt Peak	Spacewatch	·	1.1 km	MPC · JPL
551285	2013 AF_{101}	—	February 9, 2008	Catalina	CSS	H	480 m	MPC · JPL
551286	2013 AH_{101}	—	January 10, 2013	Haleakala	Pan-STARRS 1	·	990 m	MPC · JPL
551287	2013 AM_{101}	—	January 5, 2013	Mount Lemmon	Mount Lemmon Survey	·	1.2 km	MPC · JPL
551288	2013 AB_{102}	—	November 24, 2012	Nogales	M. Schwartz, P. R. Holvorcem	(1547)	1.7 km	MPC · JPL
551289	2013 AN_{102}	—	February 1, 2003	Palomar	NEAT	·	4.0 km	MPC · JPL
551290	2013 AE_{103}	—	September 19, 1998	Apache Point	SDSS Collaboration	·	4.0 km	MPC · JPL
551291	2013 AT_{104}	—	October 1, 2000	Socorro	LINEAR	V	930 m	MPC · JPL
551292	2013 AK_{107}	—	January 10, 2013	Haleakala	Pan-STARRS 1	·	970 m	MPC · JPL
551293	2013 AA_{112}	—	September 13, 2007	Catalina	CSS	JUN	910 m	MPC · JPL
551294	2013 AW_{114}	—	September 7, 2011	Kitt Peak	Spacewatch	·	1.7 km	MPC · JPL
551295	2013 AU_{118}	—	September 7, 2004	Socorro	LINEAR	·	2.1 km	MPC · JPL
551296	2013 AF_{120}	—	January 13, 2013	ESA OGS	ESA OGS	NYS	1.0 km	MPC · JPL
551297	2013 AO_{121}	—	January 5, 2013	Mount Lemmon	Mount Lemmon Survey	·	1.5 km	MPC · JPL
551298	2013 AW_{121}	—	January 13, 2013	Catalina	CSS	·	1.3 km	MPC · JPL
551299	2013 AM_{124}	—	January 14, 2013	Mount Lemmon	Mount Lemmon Survey	H	390 m	MPC · JPL
551300	2013 AL_{127}	—	December 9, 2012	Mount Lemmon	Mount Lemmon Survey	·	2.1 km	MPC · JPL

== 551301–551400 ==
back to top

Designation			Discovery			Properties		Ref
Permanent	Provisional	Named after	Date	Site	Discoverer(s)	Category	Diam.	Ref
551301	2013 AM_{129}	—	January 10, 2013	Haleakala	Pan-STARRS 1	L4 · 006	8.9 km	MPC · JPL
551302	2013 AN_{131}	—	January 6, 2013	Kitt Peak	Spacewatch	L4	8.5 km	MPC · JPL
551303	2013 AS_{131}	—	September 7, 2008	Mount Lemmon	Mount Lemmon Survey	L4	7.8 km	MPC · JPL
551304	2013 AH_{133}	—	March 12, 2002	Palomar	NEAT	L4	10 km	MPC · JPL
551305	2013 AK_{137}	—	January 11, 2008	Kitt Peak	Spacewatch	·	1.8 km	MPC · JPL
551306	2013 AY_{143}	—	February 10, 2013	Haleakala	Pan-STARRS 1	H	420 m	MPC · JPL
551307	2013 AW_{148}	—	January 4, 2013	Cerro Tololo-DECam	DECam	·	980 m	MPC · JPL
551308	2013 AB_{161}	—	January 20, 2013	Mount Lemmon	Mount Lemmon Survey	·	1.1 km	MPC · JPL
551309	2013 AP_{167}	—	January 4, 2013	Cerro Tololo-DECam	DECam	GEF	950 m	MPC · JPL
551310	2013 AV_{174}	—	January 20, 2013	Mount Lemmon	Mount Lemmon Survey	·	1.2 km	MPC · JPL
551311	2013 AV_{182}	—	January 20, 2013	Mount Lemmon	Mount Lemmon Survey	·	880 m	MPC · JPL
551312	2013 AZ_{186}	—	April 6, 2010	Kitt Peak	Spacewatch	·	1.2 km	MPC · JPL
551313	2013 AJ_{189}	—	January 12, 2008	Mount Lemmon	Mount Lemmon Survey	·	4.1 km	MPC · JPL
551314	2013 AF_{190}	—	May 30, 2015	Mount Lemmon	Mount Lemmon Survey	GAL	1.5 km	MPC · JPL
551315	2013 AY_{190}	—	July 25, 2003	Palomar	NEAT	·	1.1 km	MPC · JPL
551316	2013 AS_{192}	—	January 9, 2013	Kitt Peak	Spacewatch	·	1.1 km	MPC · JPL
551317	2013 AB_{193}	—	July 24, 2015	Haleakala	Pan-STARRS 1	·	930 m	MPC · JPL
551318	2013 AS_{193}	—	April 5, 2014	Haleakala	Pan-STARRS 1	AGN	930 m	MPC · JPL
551319	2013 AU_{193}	—	September 11, 2016	Mount Lemmon	Mount Lemmon Survey	EUN	1.0 km	MPC · JPL
551320	2013 BC	—	December 22, 2012	Haleakala	Pan-STARRS 1	L4	8.4 km	MPC · JPL
551321	2013 BQ	—	September 27, 2012	Haleakala	Pan-STARRS 1	L4	7.7 km	MPC · JPL
551322	2013 BJ_{1}	—	December 8, 2012	Kitt Peak	Spacewatch	L4	8.7 km	MPC · JPL
551323	2013 BF_{4}	—	January 16, 2013	Mount Lemmon	Mount Lemmon Survey	SUL	1.6 km	MPC · JPL
551324	2013 BR_{5}	—	September 8, 2011	Kitt Peak	Spacewatch	·	1.6 km	MPC · JPL
551325	2013 BQ_{6}	—	September 28, 2000	Kitt Peak	Spacewatch	·	1.0 km	MPC · JPL
551326	2013 BR_{9}	—	January 16, 2013	Haleakala	Pan-STARRS 1	·	1.1 km	MPC · JPL
551327	2013 BB_{12}	—	December 23, 2012	Haleakala	Pan-STARRS 1	·	1.1 km	MPC · JPL
551328	2013 BH_{12}	—	January 25, 2009	Kitt Peak	Spacewatch	·	1.2 km	MPC · JPL
551329	2013 BM_{13}	—	July 18, 2007	Mount Lemmon	Mount Lemmon Survey	·	1.5 km	MPC · JPL
551330	2013 BE_{16}	—	January 16, 2013	ASC-Kislovodsk	ASC-Kislovodsk	H	750 m	MPC · JPL
551331	2013 BX_{17}	—	May 19, 2005	Catalina	CSS	H	800 m	MPC · JPL
551332	2013 BZ_{17}	—	January 16, 2013	Mount Lemmon	Mount Lemmon Survey	L4 · 006	8.8 km	MPC · JPL
551333	2013 BQ_{19}	—	September 18, 2003	Kitt Peak	Spacewatch	(5)	1.2 km	MPC · JPL
551334	2013 BJ_{22}	—	December 23, 2012	Haleakala	Pan-STARRS 1	·	2.0 km	MPC · JPL
551335	2013 BL_{23}	—	April 13, 2002	Palomar	NEAT	·	1.1 km	MPC · JPL
551336	2013 BP_{23}	—	September 20, 2011	Kitt Peak	Spacewatch	·	2.0 km	MPC · JPL
551337	2013 BH_{25}	—	December 1, 2008	Kitt Peak	Spacewatch	MAS	650 m	MPC · JPL
551338	2013 BX_{26}	—	May 24, 2011	Haleakala	Pan-STARRS 1	H	490 m	MPC · JPL
551339	2013 BA_{28}	—	January 16, 2013	ESA OGS	ESA OGS	ADE	1.6 km	MPC · JPL
551340	2013 BH_{31}	—	October 17, 2010	Mount Lemmon	Mount Lemmon Survey	L4 · ERY	7.3 km	MPC · JPL
551341	2013 BT_{34}	—	July 28, 2011	Haleakala	Pan-STARRS 1	·	940 m	MPC · JPL
551342	2013 BY_{36}	—	January 5, 2013	Mount Lemmon	Mount Lemmon Survey	·	1.1 km	MPC · JPL
551343	2013 BV_{37}	—	March 10, 2005	Anderson Mesa	LONEOS	·	1.5 km	MPC · JPL
551344	2013 BL_{42}	—	September 26, 2011	Haleakala	Pan-STARRS 1	·	1.9 km	MPC · JPL
551345	2013 BD_{44}	—	January 19, 2013	Mount Lemmon	Mount Lemmon Survey	·	960 m	MPC · JPL
551346	2013 BD_{45}	—	January 13, 2013	Catalina	CSS	H	510 m	MPC · JPL
551347	2013 BV_{52}	—	January 16, 2013	Haleakala	Pan-STARRS 1	·	1.4 km	MPC · JPL
551348	2013 BF_{56}	—	August 26, 2000	Cerro Tololo	Deep Ecliptic Survey	·	990 m	MPC · JPL
551349	2013 BN_{57}	—	October 20, 2011	Mount Lemmon	Mount Lemmon Survey	KOR	1.2 km	MPC · JPL
551350	2013 BW_{57}	—	August 21, 2007	Siding Spring	SSS	JUN	1.1 km	MPC · JPL
551351	2013 BH_{59}	—	September 23, 2011	Haleakala	Pan-STARRS 1	KOR	1.1 km	MPC · JPL
551352	2013 BE_{62}	—	December 21, 2012	Mount Lemmon	Mount Lemmon Survey	DOR	1.7 km	MPC · JPL
551353	2013 BU_{65}	—	December 10, 2012	Mount Lemmon	Mount Lemmon Survey	·	2.4 km	MPC · JPL
551354	2013 BW_{65}	—	October 4, 2004	Kitt Peak	Spacewatch	·	950 m	MPC · JPL
551355	2013 BQ_{69}	—	January 14, 2013	Tenerife	ESA OGS	·	1.4 km	MPC · JPL
551356	2013 BU_{72}	—	January 21, 2013	Haleakala	Pan-STARRS 1	H	490 m	MPC · JPL
551357	2013 BS_{73}	—	January 31, 2013	Mount Lemmon	Mount Lemmon Survey	H	380 m	MPC · JPL
551358	2013 BZ_{73}	—	January 31, 2013	Haleakala	Pan-STARRS 1	H	490 m	MPC · JPL
551359	2013 BO_{74}	—	January 5, 2013	Mount Lemmon	Mount Lemmon Survey	·	870 m	MPC · JPL
551360	2013 BJ_{78}	—	March 12, 2002	Palomar	NEAT	·	1.4 km	MPC · JPL
551361	2013 BS_{80}	—	October 1, 2003	Anderson Mesa	LONEOS	·	1.5 km	MPC · JPL
551362	2013 BS_{82}	—	September 27, 2000	Kitt Peak	Spacewatch	H	500 m	MPC · JPL
551363	2013 BG_{84}	—	January 20, 2013	Kitt Peak	Spacewatch	·	2.0 km	MPC · JPL
551364	2013 BL_{94}	—	January 18, 2013	Kitt Peak	Spacewatch	EOS	1.4 km	MPC · JPL
551365	2013 BQ_{94}	—	January 17, 2013	Mount Lemmon	Mount Lemmon Survey	·	1 km	MPC · JPL
551366	2013 BG_{96}	—	September 26, 2011	Haleakala	Pan-STARRS 1	·	1.4 km	MPC · JPL
551367	2013 CL_{2}	—	November 20, 2009	Kitt Peak	Spacewatch	H	460 m	MPC · JPL
551368	2013 CJ_{6}	—	August 31, 2011	Haleakala	Pan-STARRS 1	·	1.6 km	MPC · JPL
551369	2013 CQ_{6}	—	January 5, 2013	Calar Alto-CASADO	Mottola, S.	PHO	720 m	MPC · JPL
551370	2013 CL_{19}	—	December 23, 2012	Haleakala	Pan-STARRS 1	·	1.0 km	MPC · JPL
551371	2013 CT_{21}	—	November 8, 2007	BlackBird	Levin, K.	·	1.3 km	MPC · JPL
551372	2013 CZ_{22}	—	January 19, 2013	Mount Lemmon	Mount Lemmon Survey	H	430 m	MPC · JPL
551373	2013 CE_{24}	—	February 2, 2013	Kitt Peak	Spacewatch	H	410 m	MPC · JPL
551374	2013 CT_{24}	—	August 16, 2006	Palomar	NEAT	AGN	1.5 km	MPC · JPL
551375	2013 CN_{26}	—	February 4, 2009	Mount Lemmon	Mount Lemmon Survey	·	870 m	MPC · JPL
551376	2013 CQ_{27}	—	January 3, 2013	Mount Lemmon	Mount Lemmon Survey	·	1.3 km	MPC · JPL
551377	2013 CV_{27}	—	March 15, 2004	Kitt Peak	Spacewatch	AGN	970 m	MPC · JPL
551378	2013 CF_{28}	—	December 27, 1997	Flagstaff	B. A. Skiff	·	1.2 km	MPC · JPL
551379	2013 CZ_{35}	—	July 28, 2011	Haleakala	Pan-STARRS 1	H	570 m	MPC · JPL
551380	2013 CE_{36}	—	February 8, 2013	Haleakala	Pan-STARRS 1	H	550 m	MPC · JPL
551381	2013 CS_{36}	—	May 1, 2003	Apache Point	SDSS Collaboration	H	450 m	MPC · JPL
551382	2013 CN_{37}	—	February 3, 2013	Elena Remote	Oreshko, A.	EUN	1.0 km	MPC · JPL
551383	2013 CZ_{42}	—	February 5, 2013	Mount Lemmon	Mount Lemmon Survey	PHO	930 m	MPC · JPL
551384	2013 CD_{45}	—	February 5, 2013	Kitt Peak	Spacewatch	·	910 m	MPC · JPL
551385	2013 CN_{47}	—	March 28, 2008	Kitt Peak	Spacewatch	·	2.2 km	MPC · JPL
551386	2013 CD_{48}	—	February 5, 2013	Charleston	R. Holmes	H	430 m	MPC · JPL
551387	2013 CE_{48}	—	May 16, 2005	Kitt Peak	Spacewatch	·	1.3 km	MPC · JPL
551388	2013 CF_{48}	—	February 5, 2000	Kitt Peak	M. W. Buie, R. L. Millis	·	2.2 km	MPC · JPL
551389	2013 CH_{48}	—	February 4, 2005	Palomar	NEAT	H	750 m	MPC · JPL
551390 Thomaskeßler	2013 CK_{50}	Thomaskeßler	February 6, 2013	iTelescope	J. Jahn	·	1.6 km	MPC · JPL
551391	2013 CK_{51}	—	February 7, 2013	Oukaïmeden	C. Rinner	·	820 m	MPC · JPL
551392	2013 CZ_{51}	—	December 2, 2005	Kitt Peak	Wasserman, L. H., Millis, R. L.	·	1.1 km	MPC · JPL
551393	2013 CO_{58}	—	February 9, 2013	Oukaïmeden	C. Rinner	·	940 m	MPC · JPL
551394	2013 CM_{59}	—	February 2, 2013	Haleakala	Pan-STARRS 1	H	390 m	MPC · JPL
551395	2013 CD_{62}	—	January 9, 2013	Mount Lemmon	Mount Lemmon Survey	·	1.1 km	MPC · JPL
551396	2013 CJ_{65}	—	January 8, 2013	Mount Lemmon	Mount Lemmon Survey	·	1.9 km	MPC · JPL
551397	2013 CP_{65}	—	December 20, 2012	Mount Lemmon	Mount Lemmon Survey	·	1.4 km	MPC · JPL
551398	2013 CU_{65}	—	February 8, 2013	Haleakala	Pan-STARRS 1	·	870 m	MPC · JPL
551399	2013 CO_{69}	—	November 2, 2011	Mount Lemmon	Mount Lemmon Survey	·	1.7 km	MPC · JPL
551400	2013 CR_{69}	—	May 8, 2008	Kitt Peak	Spacewatch	H	400 m	MPC · JPL

== 551401–551500 ==
back to top

Designation			Discovery			Properties		Ref
Permanent	Provisional	Named after	Date	Site	Discoverer(s)	Category	Diam.	Ref
551401	2013 CM_{73}	—	February 3, 2013	Haleakala	Pan-STARRS 1	H	570 m	MPC · JPL
551402	2013 CV_{76}	—	January 20, 2009	Kitt Peak	Spacewatch	·	790 m	MPC · JPL
551403	2013 CA_{78}	—	January 20, 2013	Kitt Peak	Spacewatch	·	800 m	MPC · JPL
551404	2013 CO_{78}	—	January 17, 2013	Mount Lemmon	Mount Lemmon Survey	·	1.6 km	MPC · JPL
551405	2013 CN_{79}	—	January 20, 2013	Kitt Peak	Spacewatch	PHO	940 m	MPC · JPL
551406	2013 CQ_{85}	—	January 9, 2013	Kitt Peak	Spacewatch	L4	7.5 km	MPC · JPL
551407	2013 CG_{86}	—	January 18, 2013	XuYi	PMO NEO Survey Program	·	1.1 km	MPC · JPL
551408	2013 CV_{87}	—	February 8, 2013	Haleakala	Pan-STARRS 1	H	430 m	MPC · JPL
551409	2013 CJ_{88}	—	September 23, 2008	Kitt Peak	Spacewatch	·	720 m	MPC · JPL
551410	2013 CK_{88}	—	January 16, 2013	ESA OGS	ESA OGS	H	480 m	MPC · JPL
551411	2013 CZ_{88}	—	August 29, 2006	Catalina	CSS	H	530 m	MPC · JPL
551412	2013 CU_{93}	—	February 2, 2008	Kitt Peak	Spacewatch	·	1.7 km	MPC · JPL
551413	2013 CA_{94}	—	March 5, 2006	Kitt Peak	Spacewatch	V	460 m	MPC · JPL
551414	2013 CO_{94}	—	May 29, 2003	Apache Point	SDSS Collaboration	H	410 m	MPC · JPL
551415	2013 CD_{101}	—	February 8, 2013	Haleakala	Pan-STARRS 1	·	1.2 km	MPC · JPL
551416	2013 CQ_{101}	—	September 25, 2005	Kitt Peak	Spacewatch	·	1.6 km	MPC · JPL
551417	2013 CQ_{104}	—	November 5, 2010	Mount Lemmon	Mount Lemmon Survey	L4	6.1 km	MPC · JPL
551418	2013 CJ_{105}	—	February 9, 2013	Haleakala	Pan-STARRS 1	·	1.6 km	MPC · JPL
551419	2013 CY_{106}	—	January 12, 2000	Kitt Peak	Spacewatch	H	500 m	MPC · JPL
551420	2013 CP_{108}	—	December 21, 2008	Mount Lemmon	Mount Lemmon Survey	MAS	680 m	MPC · JPL
551421	2013 CY_{112}	—	February 2, 2013	Kitt Peak	Spacewatch	·	1.5 km	MPC · JPL
551422	2013 CN_{113}	—	January 17, 2013	Haleakala	Pan-STARRS 1	·	1.4 km	MPC · JPL
551423	2013 CR_{114}	—	March 16, 2001	Kitt Peak	Spacewatch	·	1.3 km	MPC · JPL
551424	2013 CH_{116}	—	September 3, 2003	Haleakala	NEAT	·	1.5 km	MPC · JPL
551425	2013 CB_{125}	—	January 17, 2004	Palomar	NEAT	HNS	1.4 km	MPC · JPL
551426	2013 CF_{125}	—	February 5, 2013	Kitt Peak	Spacewatch	·	1.1 km	MPC · JPL
551427	2013 CZ_{125}	—	December 30, 2008	Mount Lemmon	Mount Lemmon Survey	·	1.0 km	MPC · JPL
551428	2013 CM_{128}	—	March 11, 2002	Palomar	NEAT	H	710 m	MPC · JPL
551429	2013 CT_{128}	—	February 14, 2013	Haleakala	Pan-STARRS 1	H	460 m	MPC · JPL
551430	2013 CG_{130}	—	February 5, 2013	Catalina	CSS	EUN	1.1 km	MPC · JPL
551431	2013 CA_{132}	—	March 26, 2001	Kitt Peak	Spacewatch	(5)	1.8 km	MPC · JPL
551432	2013 CK_{132}	—	February 11, 2013	Catalina	CSS	H	480 m	MPC · JPL
551433	2013 CC_{134}	—	February 15, 2013	Kislovodsk	ASC-Kislovodsk Observatory	H	560 m	MPC · JPL
551434	2013 CF_{134}	—	January 17, 2013	Catalina	CSS	PHO	1.0 km	MPC · JPL
551435	2013 CO_{134}	—	February 2, 2005	Socorro	LINEAR	H	520 m	MPC · JPL
551436	2013 CS_{135}	—	January 9, 2013	Mount Lemmon	Mount Lemmon Survey	EUN	1.1 km	MPC · JPL
551437	2013 CN_{139}	—	February 5, 2013	Kitt Peak	Spacewatch	·	2.0 km	MPC · JPL
551438	2013 CD_{147}	—	October 24, 2011	Mount Lemmon	Mount Lemmon Survey	·	1.0 km	MPC · JPL
551439	2013 CG_{149}	—	February 2, 2009	Kitt Peak	Spacewatch	·	840 m	MPC · JPL
551440	2013 CV_{154}	—	March 10, 2005	Kitt Peak	Deep Ecliptic Survey	·	660 m	MPC · JPL
551441	2013 CR_{162}	—	September 26, 2003	Apache Point	SDSS	·	990 m	MPC · JPL
551442	2013 CM_{165}	—	February 14, 2013	Kitt Peak	Spacewatch	EUN	1.3 km	MPC · JPL
551443	2013 CB_{166}	—	March 16, 2005	Kitt Peak	Spacewatch	·	840 m	MPC · JPL
551444	2013 CG_{166}	—	February 14, 2013	Haleakala	Pan-STARRS 1	(5)	980 m	MPC · JPL
551445	2013 CT_{166}	—	February 14, 2013	Mount Lemmon	Mount Lemmon Survey	EOS	1.8 km	MPC · JPL
551446	2013 CH_{167}	—	December 29, 2008	Mount Lemmon	Mount Lemmon Survey	MAS	620 m	MPC · JPL
551447	2013 CW_{168}	—	February 26, 2009	Kitt Peak	Spacewatch	MAR	860 m	MPC · JPL
551448	2013 CS_{183}	—	April 15, 2002	Palomar	NEAT	V	830 m	MPC · JPL
551449	2013 CO_{184}	—	October 11, 2002	Palomar	NEAT	·	2.2 km	MPC · JPL
551450	2013 CK_{188}	—	November 3, 2004	Palomar	NEAT	·	2.1 km	MPC · JPL
551451	2013 CY_{190}	—	September 4, 2011	Haleakala	Pan-STARRS 1	PHO	840 m	MPC · JPL
551452	2013 CE_{191}	—	August 18, 2006	Palomar	NEAT	·	1.8 km	MPC · JPL
551453	2013 CG_{202}	—	November 3, 2007	Mount Lemmon	Mount Lemmon Survey	·	1.4 km	MPC · JPL
551454	2013 CT_{207}	—	January 14, 2013	Mount Lemmon	Mount Lemmon Survey	·	1.1 km	MPC · JPL
551455	2013 CV_{211}	—	February 5, 2013	Kitt Peak	Spacewatch	·	1 km	MPC · JPL
551456	2013 CZ_{211}	—	January 20, 2013	Kitt Peak	Spacewatch	·	900 m	MPC · JPL
551457	2013 CR_{216}	—	January 16, 2013	Haleakala	Pan-STARRS 1	·	930 m	MPC · JPL
551458	2013 CU_{216}	—	January 16, 2013	Haleakala	Pan-STARRS 1	KOR	1.0 km	MPC · JPL
551459	2013 CU_{223}	—	February 25, 2000	Kitt Peak	Spacewatch	H	410 m	MPC · JPL
551460	2013 CV_{223}	—	February 14, 2013	ESA OGS	ESA OGS	H	400 m	MPC · JPL
551461	2013 CU_{224}	—	February 19, 2009	Kitt Peak	Spacewatch	·	920 m	MPC · JPL
551462	2013 CJ_{228}	—	February 19, 2009	Mount Lemmon	Mount Lemmon Survey	·	800 m	MPC · JPL
551463	2013 CL_{228}	—	February 15, 2013	Haleakala	Pan-STARRS 1	·	1.9 km	MPC · JPL
551464	2013 CB_{229}	—	January 16, 2009	Mount Lemmon	Mount Lemmon Survey	NYS	1.0 km	MPC · JPL
551465	2013 CP_{232}	—	May 23, 2014	Haleakala	Pan-STARRS 1	·	1.5 km	MPC · JPL
551466	2013 CM_{233}	—	February 13, 2013	Haleakala	Pan-STARRS 1	·	1.0 km	MPC · JPL
551467	2013 CZ_{235}	—	February 13, 2013	Haleakala	Pan-STARRS 1	·	980 m	MPC · JPL
551468	2013 CC_{239}	—	February 15, 2013	Haleakala	Pan-STARRS 1	·	1.1 km	MPC · JPL
551469	2013 CJ_{247}	—	February 9, 2013	Haleakala	Pan-STARRS 1	·	1.4 km	MPC · JPL
551470	2013 DH_{1}	—	March 6, 2008	Catalina	CSS	·	2.6 km	MPC · JPL
551471	2013 DM_{2}	—	December 29, 2008	Kitt Peak	Spacewatch	·	860 m	MPC · JPL
551472	2013 DA_{6}	—	February 16, 2013	Kitt Peak	Spacewatch	BAR	1.2 km	MPC · JPL
551473	2013 DL_{6}	—	October 26, 2011	Haleakala	Pan-STARRS 1	KOR	1.1 km	MPC · JPL
551474	2013 DH_{7}	—	April 14, 2005	Kitt Peak	Spacewatch	·	1.1 km	MPC · JPL
551475	2013 DC_{9}	—	February 9, 2013	Haleakala	Pan-STARRS 1	H	430 m	MPC · JPL
551476	2013 DX_{9}	—	January 10, 2007	Kitt Peak	Spacewatch	TIR	2.6 km	MPC · JPL
551477	2013 DB_{12}	—	February 17, 2013	Mount Lemmon	Mount Lemmon Survey	AEG	2.2 km	MPC · JPL
551478	2013 DV_{13}	—	February 17, 2013	Mount Lemmon	Mount Lemmon Survey	·	1.3 km	MPC · JPL
551479	2013 DU_{14}	—	February 17, 2013	Catalina	CSS	EUN	970 m	MPC · JPL
551480	2013 DO_{16}	—	May 4, 2005	Kitt Peak	D. E. Trilling, A. S. Rivkin	BAR	1.2 km	MPC · JPL
551481	2013 DF_{17}	—	October 1, 2005	Mount Lemmon	Mount Lemmon Survey	·	1.8 km	MPC · JPL
551482	2013 DP_{17}	—	February 20, 2013	Charleston	R. Holmes	H	490 m	MPC · JPL
551483	2013 DQ_{17}	—	June 6, 2014	Haleakala	Pan-STARRS 1	·	1.6 km	MPC · JPL
551484	2013 DU_{17}	—	February 21, 2013	Haleakala	Pan-STARRS 1	·	790 m	MPC · JPL
551485	2013 EC_{2}	—	October 23, 2003	Apache Point	SDSS Collaboration	·	1.2 km	MPC · JPL
551486	2013 EK_{3}	—	February 11, 2013	ESA OGS	ESA OGS	·	2.1 km	MPC · JPL
551487	2013 EW_{3}	—	February 15, 2013	Haleakala	Pan-STARRS 1	H	420 m	MPC · JPL
551488	2013 EX_{4}	—	October 4, 2006	Mount Lemmon	Mount Lemmon Survey	H	390 m	MPC · JPL
551489	2013 EQ_{8}	—	October 25, 2011	Haleakala	Pan-STARRS 1	·	1.5 km	MPC · JPL
551490	2013 EO_{11}	—	March 6, 2013	Haleakala	Pan-STARRS 1	H	520 m	MPC · JPL
551491	2013 EA_{16}	—	October 26, 2011	Haleakala	Pan-STARRS 1	·	1.0 km	MPC · JPL
551492	2013 EK_{21}	—	August 23, 2003	Palomar	NEAT	·	1.1 km	MPC · JPL
551493	2013 EQ_{22}	—	February 18, 2013	Kitt Peak	Spacewatch	MAR	810 m	MPC · JPL
551494	2013 EE_{23}	—	March 6, 2013	Haleakala	Pan-STARRS 1	·	1.0 km	MPC · JPL
551495	2013 EN_{24}	—	October 20, 2003	Palomar	NEAT	·	960 m	MPC · JPL
551496	2013 EH_{27}	—	March 7, 2013	Mount Lemmon	Mount Lemmon Survey	·	1.1 km	MPC · JPL
551497	2013 EB_{28}	—	March 7, 2013	Haleakala	Pan-STARRS 1	·	1.4 km	MPC · JPL
551498	2013 EP_{28}	—	March 3, 2013	Haleakala	Pan-STARRS 1	·	890 m	MPC · JPL
551499	2013 EX_{29}	—	October 27, 2003	Anderson Mesa	LONEOS	·	1.5 km	MPC · JPL
551500	2013 ED_{33}	—	February 11, 2013	Nogales	M. Schwartz, P. R. Holvorcem	(5)	1.5 km	MPC · JPL

== 551501–551600 ==
back to top

Designation			Discovery			Properties		Ref
Permanent	Provisional	Named after	Date	Site	Discoverer(s)	Category	Diam.	Ref
551501	2013 EG_{33}	—	March 6, 2013	Nogales	M. Schwartz, P. R. Holvorcem	PHO	840 m	MPC · JPL
551502	2013 ED_{35}	—	March 5, 2013	Mount Lemmon	Mount Lemmon Survey	·	700 m	MPC · JPL
551503	2013 ER_{37}	—	March 8, 2013	Haleakala	Pan-STARRS 1	·	1.0 km	MPC · JPL
551504	2013 EB_{39}	—	September 20, 2003	Palomar	NEAT	H	480 m	MPC · JPL
551505	2013 EK_{40}	—	December 1, 2008	Mount Lemmon	Mount Lemmon Survey	·	1.0 km	MPC · JPL
551506	2013 ET_{40}	—	January 10, 2013	Mount Lemmon	Mount Lemmon Survey	·	1.3 km	MPC · JPL
551507	2013 EO_{46}	—	November 14, 2006	Kitt Peak	Spacewatch	KOR	1.2 km	MPC · JPL
551508	2013 EU_{48}	—	December 10, 2006	Kitt Peak	Spacewatch	·	2.0 km	MPC · JPL
551509	2013 EE_{53}	—	December 14, 2006	Kitt Peak	Spacewatch	·	1.5 km	MPC · JPL
551510 Mariuszkukava	2013 EG_{53}	Mariuszkukava	March 8, 2013	Haleakala	Pan-STARRS 1	·	3.4 km	MPC · JPL
551511	2013 EN_{60}	—	September 16, 2006	Catalina	CSS	H	500 m	MPC · JPL
551512	2013 EO_{61}	—	March 18, 2002	Kitt Peak	Deep Ecliptic Survey	THM	2.0 km	MPC · JPL
551513	2013 EU_{62}	—	November 12, 2007	Mount Lemmon	Mount Lemmon Survey	·	960 m	MPC · JPL
551514	2013 EP_{64}	—	March 8, 2013	Haleakala	Pan-STARRS 1	·	1.5 km	MPC · JPL
551515	2013 ER_{65}	—	March 8, 2013	Haleakala	Pan-STARRS 1	·	820 m	MPC · JPL
551516	2013 EQ_{66}	—	January 18, 2012	Mount Lemmon	Mount Lemmon Survey	3:2	4.0 km	MPC · JPL
551517	2013 ET_{66}	—	February 7, 2013	ASC-Kislovodsk	ASC-Kislovodsk	·	1.1 km	MPC · JPL
551518	2013 EB_{71}	—	September 20, 2007	Kitt Peak	Spacewatch	·	1.0 km	MPC · JPL
551519	2013 EP_{72}	—	March 3, 2013	Kitt Peak	Spacewatch	·	1.7 km	MPC · JPL
551520	2013 EU_{83}	—	March 8, 2013	Haleakala	Pan-STARRS 1	·	1.5 km	MPC · JPL
551521	2013 EL_{84}	—	March 8, 2013	Haleakala	Pan-STARRS 1	·	1.0 km	MPC · JPL
551522	2013 EB_{85}	—	March 8, 2013	Haleakala	Pan-STARRS 1	·	1.4 km	MPC · JPL
551523	2013 EH_{85}	—	September 22, 2003	Palomar	NEAT	·	1.3 km	MPC · JPL
551524	2013 EA_{88}	—	March 12, 2013	Mount Lemmon	Mount Lemmon Survey	(5)	760 m	MPC · JPL
551525	2013 EP_{88}	—	March 13, 2013	Palomar	Palomar Transient Factory	·	1.4 km	MPC · JPL
551526	2013 ES_{88}	—	March 13, 2013	Palomar	Palomar Transient Factory	·	2.5 km	MPC · JPL
551527	2013 EL_{92}	—	March 6, 2013	Siding Spring	SSS	·	1.6 km	MPC · JPL
551528	2013 EA_{99}	—	August 19, 2001	Socorro	LINEAR	·	960 m	MPC · JPL
551529	2013 EM_{99}	—	April 21, 2009	Kitt Peak	Spacewatch	·	850 m	MPC · JPL
551530	2013 EE_{100}	—	March 8, 2013	Haleakala	Pan-STARRS 1	MAR	910 m	MPC · JPL
551531	2013 EC_{101}	—	February 17, 2013	Kitt Peak	Spacewatch	·	2.4 km	MPC · JPL
551532	2013 EV_{102}	—	March 11, 2013	Mount Lemmon	Mount Lemmon Survey	·	990 m	MPC · JPL
551533	2013 EN_{104}	—	March 12, 2013	Mount Lemmon	Mount Lemmon Survey	·	570 m	MPC · JPL
551534	2013 EN_{105}	—	August 24, 2011	Haleakala	Pan-STARRS 1	H	430 m	MPC · JPL
551535	2013 EJ_{106}	—	April 1, 2005	Kitt Peak	Spacewatch	·	970 m	MPC · JPL
551536	2013 EK_{107}	—	March 15, 2013	Nogales	M. Schwartz, P. R. Holvorcem	·	1.3 km	MPC · JPL
551537	2013 ED_{114}	—	February 16, 2013	Oukaïmeden	C. Rinner	H	440 m	MPC · JPL
551538	2013 EL_{114}	—	November 11, 2007	Mount Lemmon	Mount Lemmon Survey	·	2.4 km	MPC · JPL
551539	2013 EV_{114}	—	March 6, 2013	Haleakala	Pan-STARRS 1	H	400 m	MPC · JPL
551540	2013 ES_{115}	—	March 12, 2013	Kitt Peak	Spacewatch	·	1.0 km	MPC · JPL
551541	2013 EC_{116}	—	March 12, 2013	Kitt Peak	Spacewatch	·	1.1 km	MPC · JPL
551542	2013 ET_{117}	—	February 25, 2002	Palomar	NEAT	·	2.9 km	MPC · JPL
551543	2013 EN_{118}	—	March 4, 2013	Haleakala	Pan-STARRS 1	·	1.4 km	MPC · JPL
551544	2013 EU_{118}	—	March 8, 2003	Palomar	NEAT	·	3.2 km	MPC · JPL
551545	2013 EK_{120}	—	March 13, 2013	Haleakala	Pan-STARRS 1	HNS	1.0 km	MPC · JPL
551546	2013 EZ_{120}	—	March 13, 2013	Haleakala	Pan-STARRS 1	·	1 km	MPC · JPL
551547	2013 ER_{122}	—	September 18, 2011	Mount Lemmon	Mount Lemmon Survey	H	390 m	MPC · JPL
551548	2013 EH_{125}	—	July 18, 2006	Siding Spring	SSS	·	1.6 km	MPC · JPL
551549	2013 EP_{130}	—	September 25, 2005	Junk Bond	D. Healy	·	1.6 km	MPC · JPL
551550	2013 EH_{134}	—	January 14, 2008	Kitt Peak	Spacewatch	·	1.2 km	MPC · JPL
551551	2013 EE_{148}	—	November 17, 2011	Kitt Peak	Spacewatch	·	1.1 km	MPC · JPL
551552	2013 EE_{150}	—	May 3, 2013	Haleakala	Pan-STARRS 1	·	1.0 km	MPC · JPL
551553	2013 EH_{156}	—	December 29, 2008	Kitt Peak	Spacewatch	MAS	540 m	MPC · JPL
551554	2013 EU_{156}	—	March 5, 2013	Mount Lemmon	Mount Lemmon Survey	·	1.2 km	MPC · JPL
551555	2013 EQ_{158}	—	March 6, 2013	Haleakala	Pan-STARRS 1	·	890 m	MPC · JPL
551556	2013 EU_{158}	—	March 13, 2013	Mount Lemmon	Mount Lemmon Survey	·	890 m	MPC · JPL
551557	2013 EG_{159}	—	March 5, 2013	Haleakala	Pan-STARRS 1	NYS	1.1 km	MPC · JPL
551558	2013 EK_{160}	—	February 4, 2017	Haleakala	Pan-STARRS 1	·	1.1 km	MPC · JPL
551559	2013 EC_{161}	—	March 8, 2013	Haleakala	Pan-STARRS 1	·	1.7 km	MPC · JPL
551560	2013 EU_{161}	—	March 3, 2013	Mount Lemmon	Mount Lemmon Survey	·	1.7 km	MPC · JPL
551561	2013 EZ_{162}	—	January 13, 2018	Mount Lemmon	Mount Lemmon Survey	·	2.3 km	MPC · JPL
551562	2013 ET_{163}	—	March 4, 2013	Haleakala	Pan-STARRS 1	·	780 m	MPC · JPL
551563	2013 ER_{169}	—	March 14, 2013	Kitt Peak	Spacewatch	·	770 m	MPC · JPL
551564	2013 FC_{3}	—	April 1, 2005	Kitt Peak	Spacewatch	·	1.2 km	MPC · JPL
551565	2013 FF_{3}	—	March 13, 2013	Palomar	Palomar Transient Factory	·	1.0 km	MPC · JPL
551566	2013 FN_{3}	—	March 17, 2013	Palomar	Palomar Transient Factory	·	910 m	MPC · JPL
551567	2013 FQ_{3}	—	April 4, 2002	Palomar	NEAT	TIR	2.5 km	MPC · JPL
551568	2013 FR_{3}	—	July 3, 2005	Palomar	NEAT	ADE	2.3 km	MPC · JPL
551569	2013 FX_{4}	—	March 17, 2013	Palomar	Palomar Transient Factory	H	470 m	MPC · JPL
551570	2013 FD_{5}	—	March 15, 2013	Mount Lemmon	Mount Lemmon Survey	·	950 m	MPC · JPL
551571	2013 FH_{6}	—	April 20, 2009	Kitt Peak	Spacewatch	·	1.0 km	MPC · JPL
551572	2013 FS_{8}	—	March 8, 2013	Haleakala	Pan-STARRS 1	·	1.2 km	MPC · JPL
551573	2013 FW_{8}	—	March 25, 2009	Siding Spring	SSS	·	1.5 km	MPC · JPL
551574	2013 FV_{11}	—	March 13, 2013	Palomar	Palomar Transient Factory	·	1.7 km	MPC · JPL
551575	2013 FW_{12}	—	August 29, 2011	Mayhill-ISON	L. Elenin	H	500 m	MPC · JPL
551576	2013 FQ_{17}	—	January 27, 2007	Mount Lemmon	Mount Lemmon Survey	·	2.4 km	MPC · JPL
551577	2013 FM_{21}	—	March 15, 2013	Kitt Peak	Spacewatch	·	1.9 km	MPC · JPL
551578	2013 FH_{22}	—	March 11, 2005	Mount Lemmon	Mount Lemmon Survey	3:2	4.2 km	MPC · JPL
551579	2013 FM_{24}	—	September 19, 1998	Apache Point	SDSS Collaboration	·	970 m	MPC · JPL
551580	2013 FJ_{26}	—	March 4, 2013	Haleakala	Pan-STARRS 1	·	1.4 km	MPC · JPL
551581	2013 FH_{30}	—	March 19, 2013	Mayhill-ISON	L. Elenin	·	930 m	MPC · JPL
551582	2013 FX_{30}	—	March 17, 2013	Mount Lemmon	Mount Lemmon Survey	·	950 m	MPC · JPL
551583	2013 FT_{31}	—	March 19, 2013	Haleakala	Pan-STARRS 1	·	860 m	MPC · JPL
551584	2013 FG_{32}	—	October 2, 2015	Mount Lemmon	Mount Lemmon Survey	THM	1.8 km	MPC · JPL
551585	2013 GW_{2}	—	February 15, 2013	Haleakala	Pan-STARRS 1	·	1.9 km	MPC · JPL
551586	2013 GR_{7}	—	March 14, 2013	Palomar	Palomar Transient Factory	H	450 m	MPC · JPL
551587	2013 GW_{8}	—	August 19, 2006	Kitt Peak	Spacewatch	·	1.4 km	MPC · JPL
551588	2013 GV_{12}	—	July 24, 2003	Palomar	NEAT	TIR	3.0 km	MPC · JPL
551589	2013 GN_{14}	—	August 3, 2011	Haleakala	Pan-STARRS 1	H	470 m	MPC · JPL
551590	2013 GA_{15}	—	March 31, 2008	Mount Lemmon	Mount Lemmon Survey	·	2.1 km	MPC · JPL
551591	2013 GO_{17}	—	April 13, 2005	Kitt Peak	Spacewatch	·	1.1 km	MPC · JPL
551592	2013 GH_{18}	—	March 17, 2013	Nogales	M. Schwartz, P. R. Holvorcem	·	1.2 km	MPC · JPL
551593	2013 GA_{20}	—	March 19, 2013	Haleakala	Pan-STARRS 1	·	910 m	MPC · JPL
551594	2013 GF_{22}	—	August 11, 2001	Palomar	NEAT	·	1.2 km	MPC · JPL
551595	2013 GL_{23}	—	April 2, 2009	Kitt Peak	Spacewatch	·	1.0 km	MPC · JPL
551596	2013 GL_{25}	—	January 30, 2012	Kitt Peak	Spacewatch	3:2	5.6 km	MPC · JPL
551597	2013 GG_{26}	—	April 8, 2002	Palomar	NEAT	TIR	3.5 km	MPC · JPL
551598	2013 GT_{30}	—	April 7, 2013	Mount Lemmon	Mount Lemmon Survey	·	880 m	MPC · JPL
551599	2013 GW_{31}	—	March 18, 2013	Kitt Peak	Spacewatch	·	1.1 km	MPC · JPL
551600	2013 GT_{32}	—	March 5, 2013	Haleakala	Pan-STARRS 1	H	440 m	MPC · JPL

== 551601–551700 ==
back to top

Designation			Discovery			Properties		Ref
Permanent	Provisional	Named after	Date	Site	Discoverer(s)	Category	Diam.	Ref
551601 Antonijové	2013 GN_{34}	Antonijové	April 7, 2013	SM Montmagastrell	Bosch, J. M., Olivera, R. M.	MAR	1.0 km	MPC · JPL
551602	2013 GQ_{34}	—	December 5, 2003	Socorro	LINEAR	·	2.4 km	MPC · JPL
551603	2013 GE_{40}	—	March 16, 2013	Kitt Peak	Spacewatch	H	480 m	MPC · JPL
551604	2013 GQ_{40}	—	April 7, 2013	Mount Lemmon	Mount Lemmon Survey	·	1.2 km	MPC · JPL
551605	2013 GT_{45}	—	March 19, 2009	Mount Lemmon	Mount Lemmon Survey	·	1.2 km	MPC · JPL
551606	2013 GU_{46}	—	April 1, 2013	Mount Lemmon	Mount Lemmon Survey	THM	1.8 km	MPC · JPL
551607	2013 GS_{48}	—	February 15, 2013	ESA OGS	ESA OGS	H	370 m	MPC · JPL
551608	2013 GN_{52}	—	April 10, 2013	Haleakala	Pan-STARRS 1	·	1.0 km	MPC · JPL
551609	2013 GB_{58}	—	March 28, 2008	Mount Lemmon	Mount Lemmon Survey	KOR	1.1 km	MPC · JPL
551610	2013 GE_{64}	—	March 14, 2013	Palomar	Palomar Transient Factory	·	1.7 km	MPC · JPL
551611	2013 GY_{69}	—	April 6, 2013	Haleakala	Pan-STARRS 1	EUN	1.2 km	MPC · JPL
551612	2013 GT_{78}	—	June 28, 2001	Anderson Mesa	LONEOS	·	1.8 km	MPC · JPL
551613	2013 GG_{79}	—	September 26, 2003	Apache Point	SDSS Collaboration	·	1.5 km	MPC · JPL
551614	2013 GK_{79}	—	March 16, 2013	Mount Lemmon	Mount Lemmon Survey	·	1.1 km	MPC · JPL
551615	2013 GP_{80}	—	August 25, 2011	Siding Spring	SSS	H	650 m	MPC · JPL
551616	2013 GC_{82}	—	February 6, 2013	ASC-Kislovodsk	ASC-Kislovodsk	H	540 m	MPC · JPL
551617	2013 GX_{82}	—	April 6, 2013	Haleakala	Pan-STARRS 1	·	540 m	MPC · JPL
551618	2013 GG_{83}	—	April 14, 2013	Mount Lemmon	Mount Lemmon Survey	·	1.3 km	MPC · JPL
551619	2013 GG_{84}	—	April 15, 2013	Haleakala	Pan-STARRS 1	·	520 m	MPC · JPL
551620	2013 GF_{87}	—	April 14, 2013	Mount Lemmon	Mount Lemmon Survey	·	3.2 km	MPC · JPL
551621	2013 GD_{90}	—	September 20, 2011	Haleakala	Pan-STARRS 1	H	490 m	MPC · JPL
551622	2013 GL_{90}	—	April 6, 2005	Catalina	CSS	·	1.4 km	MPC · JPL
551623	2013 GP_{90}	—	April 2, 2009	Mount Lemmon	Mount Lemmon Survey	·	980 m	MPC · JPL
551624	2013 GD_{91}	—	April 15, 2013	Haleakala	Pan-STARRS 1	·	1.0 km	MPC · JPL
551625	2013 GS_{92}	—	July 4, 2005	Palomar	NEAT	slow	2.1 km	MPC · JPL
551626	2013 GG_{98}	—	September 14, 2006	Mauna Kea	Masiero, J., R. Jedicke	·	1.0 km	MPC · JPL
551627	2013 GM_{102}	—	March 19, 2013	Haleakala	Pan-STARRS 1	·	1.2 km	MPC · JPL
551628	2013 GX_{102}	—	April 18, 2009	Kitt Peak	Spacewatch	·	690 m	MPC · JPL
551629	2013 GB_{103}	—	November 12, 2005	Kitt Peak	Spacewatch	·	3.5 km	MPC · JPL
551630	2013 GQ_{107}	—	October 25, 2011	Haleakala	Pan-STARRS 1	·	1.2 km	MPC · JPL
551631	2013 GD_{108}	—	March 28, 2009	Mount Lemmon	Mount Lemmon Survey	PHO	810 m	MPC · JPL
551632	2013 GZ_{108}	—	July 4, 2005	Palomar	NEAT	·	1.6 km	MPC · JPL
551633	2013 GR_{110}	—	March 18, 2013	Kitt Peak	Spacewatch	·	990 m	MPC · JPL
551634	2013 GK_{111}	—	January 7, 2006	Mount Lemmon	Mount Lemmon Survey	·	2.9 km	MPC · JPL
551635	2013 GB_{112}	—	April 12, 2013	Haleakala	Pan-STARRS 1	T_{j} (2.99)	2.7 km	MPC · JPL
551636	2013 GQ_{112}	—	March 13, 2013	Kitt Peak	Spacewatch	EUN	820 m	MPC · JPL
551637	2013 GQ_{113}	—	November 8, 2010	Kitt Peak	Spacewatch	EOS	2.3 km	MPC · JPL
551638	2013 GP_{114}	—	November 14, 2007	Mount Lemmon	Mount Lemmon Survey	·	940 m	MPC · JPL
551639	2013 GS_{115}	—	April 3, 2013	Palomar	Palomar Transient Factory	EUN	890 m	MPC · JPL
551640	2013 GO_{116}	—	October 27, 1995	Kitt Peak	Spacewatch	·	1.2 km	MPC · JPL
551641	2013 GJ_{120}	—	March 7, 2013	Kitt Peak	Spacewatch	KON	1.8 km	MPC · JPL
551642	2013 GM_{123}	—	April 11, 2013	Mount Lemmon	Mount Lemmon Survey	·	820 m	MPC · JPL
551643	2013 GL_{125}	—	April 11, 2013	Kitt Peak	Spacewatch	ADE	1.6 km	MPC · JPL
551644	2013 GB_{126}	—	April 7, 2013	Kitt Peak	Spacewatch	·	1.3 km	MPC · JPL
551645	2013 GM_{128}	—	November 18, 2007	Mount Lemmon	Mount Lemmon Survey	·	1.8 km	MPC · JPL
551646	2013 GZ_{128}	—	May 3, 2009	Mount Lemmon	Mount Lemmon Survey	·	1.1 km	MPC · JPL
551647	2013 GP_{129}	—	April 5, 2013	Palomar	Palomar Transient Factory	·	3.2 km	MPC · JPL
551648	2013 GK_{130}	—	April 11, 2013	Nogales	M. Schwartz, P. R. Holvorcem	·	4.4 km	MPC · JPL
551649	2013 GM_{130}	—	April 12, 2013	Nogales	M. Schwartz, P. R. Holvorcem	·	960 m	MPC · JPL
551650	2013 GU_{130}	—	June 29, 2005	Palomar	NEAT	EUN	1.4 km	MPC · JPL
551651	2013 GE_{131}	—	March 18, 2009	Kitt Peak	Spacewatch	·	1.2 km	MPC · JPL
551652	2013 GK_{134}	—	March 15, 2013	Kitt Peak	Spacewatch	3:2	4.1 km	MPC · JPL
551653	2013 GX_{135}	—	August 19, 2001	Haleakala	NEAT	·	1.8 km	MPC · JPL
551654	2013 GE_{136}	—	January 31, 2003	Palomar	NEAT	WIT	1.4 km	MPC · JPL
551655	2013 GK_{136}	—	April 14, 2013	Palomar	Palomar Transient Factory	·	2.8 km	MPC · JPL
551656	2013 GB_{139}	—	November 3, 2011	Kitt Peak	Spacewatch	·	1.1 km	MPC · JPL
551657	2013 GC_{139}	—	April 13, 2013	Haleakala	Pan-STARRS 1	HNS	950 m	MPC · JPL
551658	2013 GQ_{139}	—	May 26, 2009	Mount Lemmon	Mount Lemmon Survey	MAR	770 m	MPC · JPL
551659	2013 GA_{142}	—	June 29, 2014	Haleakala	Pan-STARRS 1	·	2.2 km	MPC · JPL
551660	2013 GC_{142}	—	April 13, 2013	Haleakala	Pan-STARRS 1	·	1.4 km	MPC · JPL
551661	2013 GU_{143}	—	April 11, 2013	Mount Lemmon	Mount Lemmon Survey	·	1.5 km	MPC · JPL
551662	2013 GX_{146}	—	November 25, 2016	Mount Lemmon	Mount Lemmon Survey	·	1.9 km	MPC · JPL
551663	2013 GD_{147}	—	October 12, 2015	Haleakala	Pan-STARRS 1	·	840 m	MPC · JPL
551664	2013 GM_{147}	—	April 7, 2013	Mount Lemmon	Mount Lemmon Survey	·	970 m	MPC · JPL
551665	2013 GF_{151}	—	April 12, 2013	Haleakala	Pan-STARRS 1	·	1.0 km	MPC · JPL
551666	2013 GU_{151}	—	April 11, 2013	ESA OGS	ESA OGS	·	560 m	MPC · JPL
551667	2013 GF_{153}	—	April 12, 2013	Haleakala	Pan-STARRS 1	·	1.1 km	MPC · JPL
551668	2013 HF	—	November 20, 2003	Socorro	LINEAR	H	510 m	MPC · JPL
551669	2013 HS	—	April 12, 2013	Elena Remote	Oreshko, A.	·	1.2 km	MPC · JPL
551670	2013 HT	—	April 16, 2013	Nogales	M. Schwartz, P. R. Holvorcem	H	570 m	MPC · JPL
551671	2013 HU	—	September 1, 2005	Anderson Mesa	LONEOS	(116763)	1.8 km	MPC · JPL
551672	2013 HF_{2}	—	November 28, 2003	Kitt Peak	Spacewatch	H	520 m	MPC · JPL
551673	2013 HY_{4}	—	May 15, 2005	Palomar	NEAT	·	1.6 km	MPC · JPL
551674	2013 HQ_{5}	—	November 21, 2003	Nogales	P. R. Holvorcem, M. Schwartz	·	1.7 km	MPC · JPL
551675	2013 HR_{6}	—	March 31, 2009	Mount Lemmon	Mount Lemmon Survey	RAF	720 m	MPC · JPL
551676	2013 HY_{6}	—	April 16, 2004	Apache Point	SDSS Collaboration	HNS	1.3 km	MPC · JPL
551677	2013 HP_{7}	—	April 3, 2013	Palomar	Palomar Transient Factory	H	630 m	MPC · JPL
551678	2013 HD_{8}	—	January 17, 2004	Palomar	NEAT	·	1.5 km	MPC · JPL
551679	2013 HJ_{8}	—	April 30, 2009	Kitt Peak	Spacewatch	(194)	1.3 km	MPC · JPL
551680	2013 HD_{11}	—	April 14, 2013	Palomar	Palomar Transient Factory	H	490 m	MPC · JPL
551681	2013 HW_{12}	—	January 2, 2012	Kitt Peak	Spacewatch	HYG	3.4 km	MPC · JPL
551682	2013 HZ_{12}	—	March 16, 2013	Kitt Peak	Spacewatch	·	1.1 km	MPC · JPL
551683	2013 HL_{13}	—	April 20, 2013	Palomar	Palomar Transient Factory	EUN	980 m	MPC · JPL
551684	2013 HP_{13}	—	November 18, 2011	Mount Lemmon	Mount Lemmon Survey	·	3.5 km	MPC · JPL
551685	2013 HT_{15}	—	March 26, 2006	Mount Lemmon	Mount Lemmon Survey	APO · PHA	150 m	MPC · JPL
551686	2013 HP_{19}	—	April 30, 2013	Kitt Peak	Spacewatch	·	1.2 km	MPC · JPL
551687	2013 HB_{21}	—	May 28, 2008	Mount Lemmon	Mount Lemmon Survey	H	530 m	MPC · JPL
551688	2013 HB_{23}	—	January 17, 2004	Palomar	NEAT	JUN	1.2 km	MPC · JPL
551689	2013 HN_{27}	—	December 25, 2003	Kitt Peak	Spacewatch	·	1.6 km	MPC · JPL
551690	2013 HS_{28}	—	April 20, 2013	Mount Lemmon	Mount Lemmon Survey	EUN	1.1 km	MPC · JPL
551691	2013 HV_{30}	—	May 4, 2013	Haleakala	Pan-STARRS 1	·	1.1 km	MPC · JPL
551692	2013 HX_{31}	—	April 9, 2013	Haleakala	Pan-STARRS 1	LUT	3.3 km	MPC · JPL
551693	2013 HP_{34}	—	April 16, 2013	Cerro Tololo-DECam	DECam	·	870 m	MPC · JPL
551694	2013 HV_{34}	—	April 9, 2013	Haleakala	Pan-STARRS 1	·	1.1 km	MPC · JPL
551695	2013 HE_{37}	—	September 10, 2009	ESA OGS	ESA OGS	·	2.3 km	MPC · JPL
551696	2013 HH_{38}	—	May 4, 2013	Haleakala	Pan-STARRS 1	·	970 m	MPC · JPL
551697	2013 HB_{44}	—	April 16, 2013	Cerro Tololo-DECam	DECam	·	1 km	MPC · JPL
551698	2013 HL_{50}	—	October 26, 2011	Haleakala	Pan-STARRS 1	·	850 m	MPC · JPL
551699	2013 HU_{52}	—	July 13, 2001	Palomar	NEAT	·	970 m	MPC · JPL
551700	2013 HO_{54}	—	November 19, 2007	Mount Lemmon	Mount Lemmon Survey	(5)	1.0 km	MPC · JPL

== 551701–551800 ==
back to top

Designation			Discovery			Properties		Ref
Permanent	Provisional	Named after	Date	Site	Discoverer(s)	Category	Diam.	Ref
551701	2013 HL_{55}	—	April 9, 2013	Haleakala	Pan-STARRS 1	·	1.1 km	MPC · JPL
551702	2013 HO_{55}	—	May 1, 2013	Mount Lemmon	Mount Lemmon Survey	MAR	740 m	MPC · JPL
551703	2013 HL_{57}	—	September 26, 2011	Kitt Peak	Spacewatch	·	1.1 km	MPC · JPL
551704	2013 HZ_{64}	—	October 24, 2011	Haleakala	Pan-STARRS 1	(5)	970 m	MPC · JPL
551705	2013 HF_{70}	—	April 9, 2013	Haleakala	Pan-STARRS 1	MAR	1.1 km	MPC · JPL
551706	2013 HL_{76}	—	June 10, 2005	Catalina	CSS	·	2.4 km	MPC · JPL
551707	2013 HF_{82}	—	October 25, 2011	Haleakala	Pan-STARRS 1	KON	1.5 km	MPC · JPL
551708	2013 HG_{86}	—	April 9, 2013	Haleakala	Pan-STARRS 1	·	780 m	MPC · JPL
551709	2013 HH_{90}	—	April 9, 2013	Haleakala	Pan-STARRS 1	·	960 m	MPC · JPL
551710	2013 HO_{92}	—	March 15, 2013	Kitt Peak	Spacewatch	EUN	1.0 km	MPC · JPL
551711	2013 HU_{93}	—	October 29, 2002	Kitt Peak	Spacewatch	·	1.5 km	MPC · JPL
551712	2013 HZ_{103}	—	April 9, 2013	Haleakala	Pan-STARRS 1	·	850 m	MPC · JPL
551713	2013 HZ_{108}	—	April 10, 2013	Haleakala	Pan-STARRS 1	·	940 m	MPC · JPL
551714	2013 HO_{112}	—	December 5, 2007	Kitt Peak	Spacewatch	(5)	810 m	MPC · JPL
551715	2013 HB_{126}	—	September 2, 2010	Mount Lemmon	Mount Lemmon Survey	·	1.1 km	MPC · JPL
551716	2013 HQ_{126}	—	April 9, 2013	Haleakala	Pan-STARRS 1	EUN	850 m	MPC · JPL
551717	2013 HT_{135}	—	March 17, 2013	Mount Lemmon	Mount Lemmon Survey	·	820 m	MPC · JPL
551718	2013 HP_{137}	—	April 7, 2013	Mount Lemmon	Mount Lemmon Survey	3:2	4.3 km	MPC · JPL
551719	2013 HC_{144}	—	March 29, 2001	Kitt Peak	Spacewatch	·	1.1 km	MPC · JPL
551720	2013 HS_{144}	—	November 27, 2011	Catalina	CSS	·	920 m	MPC · JPL
551721	2013 HY_{148}	—	September 30, 2006	Kitt Peak	Spacewatch	·	1.2 km	MPC · JPL
551722	2013 HD_{157}	—	April 16, 2013	Haleakala	Pan-STARRS 1	KON	1.8 km	MPC · JPL
551723	2013 HM_{158}	—	April 19, 2013	Haleakala	Pan-STARRS 1	·	660 m	MPC · JPL
551724	2013 HS_{158}	—	April 19, 2013	Haleakala	Pan-STARRS 1	·	1.4 km	MPC · JPL
551725	2013 HC_{160}	—	April 16, 2013	Haleakala	Pan-STARRS 1	HNS	1.0 km	MPC · JPL
551726	2013 JN	—	March 14, 2013	Palomar	Palomar Transient Factory	·	1.0 km	MPC · JPL
551727	2013 JC_{1}	—	April 15, 2013	Haleakala	Pan-STARRS 1	EUN	1.5 km	MPC · JPL
551728	2013 JC_{4}	—	September 18, 2003	Kitt Peak	Spacewatch	·	580 m	MPC · JPL
551729	2013 JR_{5}	—	August 6, 2005	Palomar	NEAT	EUN	920 m	MPC · JPL
551730	2013 JF_{8}	—	November 13, 2002	Palomar	NEAT	MAR	1.2 km	MPC · JPL
551731	2013 JN_{8}	—	October 21, 2006	Kitt Peak	Spacewatch	·	1.2 km	MPC · JPL
551732	2013 JP_{10}	—	April 21, 2009	Kitt Peak	Spacewatch	·	980 m	MPC · JPL
551733	2013 JK_{11}	—	April 13, 2013	Haleakala	Pan-STARRS 1	·	1.7 km	MPC · JPL
551734	2013 JW_{11}	—	October 28, 2006	Mount Lemmon	Mount Lemmon Survey	·	1.5 km	MPC · JPL
551735	2013 JY_{11}	—	January 1, 2003	Kitt Peak	Spacewatch	·	2.0 km	MPC · JPL
551736	2013 JZ_{12}	—	April 15, 2013	Haleakala	Pan-STARRS 1	·	2.5 km	MPC · JPL
551737	2013 JO_{13}	—	January 17, 2008	Mount Lemmon	Mount Lemmon Survey	·	1.2 km	MPC · JPL
551738	2013 JG_{15}	—	February 15, 2013	Haleakala	Pan-STARRS 1	·	2.5 km	MPC · JPL
551739	2013 JJ_{15}	—	May 5, 2013	Haleakala	Pan-STARRS 1	·	2.0 km	MPC · JPL
551740	2013 JU_{15}	—	May 7, 2013	Kitt Peak	Spacewatch	T_{j} (2.84)	4.7 km	MPC · JPL
551741	2013 JQ_{21}	—	January 13, 2008	Kitt Peak	Spacewatch	ADE	1.8 km	MPC · JPL
551742	2013 JB_{22}	—	July 5, 2005	Palomar	NEAT	BRG	1.3 km	MPC · JPL
551743	2013 JY_{23}	—	April 11, 2013	Kitt Peak	Spacewatch	·	1.2 km	MPC · JPL
551744	2013 JS_{25}	—	May 12, 2013	Elena Remote	Oreshko, A.	·	570 m	MPC · JPL
551745	2013 JD_{27}	—	April 24, 2009	Bergisch Gladbach	W. Bickel	EUN	1.3 km	MPC · JPL
551746	2013 JP_{28}	—	May 10, 2013	Haleakala	Pan-STARRS 1	·	540 m	MPC · JPL
551747	2013 JV_{30}	—	May 11, 2013	Mount Lemmon	Mount Lemmon Survey	·	1.4 km	MPC · JPL
551748	2013 JC_{31}	—	August 4, 2005	Palomar	NEAT	BAR	970 m	MPC · JPL
551749	2013 JD_{32}	—	May 12, 2013	Mount Lemmon	Mount Lemmon Survey	·	1.3 km	MPC · JPL
551750	2013 JU_{32}	—	October 11, 2001	Palomar	NEAT	ADE	2.1 km	MPC · JPL
551751	2013 JJ_{33}	—	May 13, 2013	Palomar	Palomar Transient Factory	·	1.4 km	MPC · JPL
551752	2013 JM_{36}	—	May 9, 2005	Kitt Peak	Spacewatch	·	1.5 km	MPC · JPL
551753	2013 JP_{36}	—	November 7, 2005	Mauna Kea	A. Boattini	·	4.2 km	MPC · JPL
551754	2013 JF_{39}	—	April 20, 2013	Mount Lemmon	Mount Lemmon Survey	·	1.4 km	MPC · JPL
551755	2013 JA_{41}	—	April 15, 2013	Haleakala	Pan-STARRS 1	·	600 m	MPC · JPL
551756	2013 JH_{41}	—	April 13, 2013	Mount Lemmon	Mount Lemmon Survey	·	1.3 km	MPC · JPL
551757	2013 JT_{41}	—	November 14, 2010	Mount Lemmon	Mount Lemmon Survey	·	3.5 km	MPC · JPL
551758	2013 JY_{41}	—	March 11, 2004	Palomar	NEAT	·	2.0 km	MPC · JPL
551759	2013 JY_{43}	—	March 23, 2003	Apache Point	SDSS	·	550 m	MPC · JPL
551760	2013 JQ_{44}	—	May 8, 2013	Haleakala	Pan-STARRS 1	·	920 m	MPC · JPL
551761	2013 JG_{46}	—	August 9, 2001	Palomar	NEAT	·	1.5 km	MPC · JPL
551762	2013 JP_{49}	—	January 8, 2002	Kitt Peak	Spacewatch	KOR	1.2 km	MPC · JPL
551763	2013 JS_{50}	—	April 10, 2013	Mount Lemmon	Mount Lemmon Survey	·	3.0 km	MPC · JPL
551764	2013 JP_{53}	—	September 25, 2007	Mount Lemmon	Mount Lemmon Survey	·	740 m	MPC · JPL
551765	2013 JU_{53}	—	April 13, 2013	Kitt Peak	Spacewatch	·	530 m	MPC · JPL
551766	2013 JK_{55}	—	August 27, 2005	Palomar	NEAT	·	1.8 km	MPC · JPL
551767	2013 JW_{55}	—	February 8, 2008	Mount Lemmon	Mount Lemmon Survey	·	1.0 km	MPC · JPL
551768	2013 JV_{59}	—	September 17, 2009	Kitt Peak	Spacewatch	·	2.7 km	MPC · JPL
551769	2013 JL_{60}	—	April 12, 2013	Haleakala	Pan-STARRS 1	·	1.1 km	MPC · JPL
551770	2013 JT_{66}	—	May 2, 2009	Siding Spring	SSS	·	1.9 km	MPC · JPL
551771	2013 JV_{66}	—	October 13, 2010	Bergisch Gladbach	W. Bickel	·	1.6 km	MPC · JPL
551772	2013 JW_{66}	—	May 3, 2013	Mount Lemmon	Mount Lemmon Survey	·	920 m	MPC · JPL
551773	2013 JQ_{67}	—	May 11, 2013	Catalina	CSS	·	1.5 km	MPC · JPL
551774	2013 JY_{70}	—	October 16, 2015	Mount Lemmon	Mount Lemmon Survey	EUN	930 m	MPC · JPL
551775	2013 JE_{71}	—	November 23, 2015	Mount Lemmon	Mount Lemmon Survey	HNS	740 m	MPC · JPL
551776	2013 JJ_{71}	—	May 15, 2013	Haleakala	Pan-STARRS 1	·	1.3 km	MPC · JPL
551777	2013 JV_{73}	—	March 13, 2016	Haleakala	Pan-STARRS 1	·	550 m	MPC · JPL
551778	2013 JB_{76}	—	May 12, 2013	Mount Lemmon	Mount Lemmon Survey	·	900 m	MPC · JPL
551779	2013 JA_{77}	—	May 8, 2013	Haleakala	Pan-STARRS 1	·	1.2 km	MPC · JPL
551780	2013 KY	—	September 30, 2010	Mount Lemmon	Mount Lemmon Survey	·	1.6 km	MPC · JPL
551781	2013 KD_{3}	—	December 7, 2006	Palomar	NEAT	·	1.4 km	MPC · JPL
551782	2013 KP_{3}	—	January 27, 2012	Mount Lemmon	Mount Lemmon Survey	EUN	1.1 km	MPC · JPL
551783	2013 KB_{5}	—	April 3, 2009	Cerro Burek	I. de la Ceuva	·	1.2 km	MPC · JPL
551784	2013 KS_{5}	—	March 14, 2004	Palomar	NEAT	·	1.7 km	MPC · JPL
551785	2013 KF_{7}	—	April 10, 2013	Kitt Peak	Spacewatch	·	1.4 km	MPC · JPL
551786	2013 KO_{9}	—	May 31, 2008	Mount Lemmon	Mount Lemmon Survey	·	3.9 km	MPC · JPL
551787	2013 KF_{10}	—	August 29, 2005	Palomar	NEAT	EUN	1.3 km	MPC · JPL
551788	2013 KX_{11}	—	July 18, 2001	Palomar	NEAT	·	1.3 km	MPC · JPL
551789	2013 KA_{12}	—	November 18, 2007	Kitt Peak	Spacewatch	·	620 m	MPC · JPL
551790	2013 KC_{12}	—	September 14, 2007	Mount Lemmon	Mount Lemmon Survey	·	560 m	MPC · JPL
551791	2013 KK_{12}	—	January 15, 2008	Mount Lemmon	Mount Lemmon Survey	(194)	1.3 km	MPC · JPL
551792	2013 KL_{12}	—	August 28, 2005	Kitt Peak	Spacewatch	·	1.6 km	MPC · JPL
551793	2013 KQ_{12}	—	January 12, 2008	Kitt Peak	Spacewatch	·	1.3 km	MPC · JPL
551794	2013 KF_{15}	—	May 30, 2013	Mount Lemmon	Mount Lemmon Survey	JUN	880 m	MPC · JPL
551795	2013 KR_{15}	—	October 28, 2006	Kitt Peak	Spacewatch	·	1.4 km	MPC · JPL
551796	2013 KC_{16}	—	May 31, 2013	Nogales	M. Schwartz, P. R. Holvorcem	·	1.7 km	MPC · JPL
551797	2013 KA_{17}	—	September 29, 2001	Palomar	NEAT	·	1.7 km	MPC · JPL
551798	2013 KM_{18}	—	August 23, 2001	Anderson Mesa	LONEOS	·	1.3 km	MPC · JPL
551799	2013 KK_{19}	—	May 31, 2013	Kitt Peak	Spacewatch	·	1.4 km	MPC · JPL
551800	2013 KO_{19}	—	May 18, 2013	Mount Lemmon	Mount Lemmon Survey	·	1.1 km	MPC · JPL

== 551801–551900 ==
back to top

Designation			Discovery			Properties		Ref
Permanent	Provisional	Named after	Date	Site	Discoverer(s)	Category	Diam.	Ref
551801	2013 KS_{19}	—	February 13, 2013	Haleakala	Pan-STARRS 1	·	1.5 km	MPC · JPL
551802	2013 LZ	—	November 21, 2009	Mount Lemmon	Mount Lemmon Survey	H	390 m	MPC · JPL
551803	2013 LZ_{1}	—	July 7, 2003	Palomar	NEAT	·	620 m	MPC · JPL
551804	2013 LA_{4}	—	May 8, 2013	Haleakala	Pan-STARRS 1	·	1.1 km	MPC · JPL
551805	2013 LK_{8}	—	May 16, 2013	Nogales	M. Schwartz, P. R. Holvorcem	·	1.6 km	MPC · JPL
551806	2013 LA_{10}	—	March 3, 2000	Apache Point	SDSS Collaboration	·	1.0 km	MPC · JPL
551807	2013 LC_{10}	—	June 4, 2013	Mount Lemmon	Mount Lemmon Survey	·	1.2 km	MPC · JPL
551808	2013 LL_{11}	—	June 4, 2013	Mount Lemmon	Mount Lemmon Survey	·	1.1 km	MPC · JPL
551809	2013 LY_{13}	—	June 5, 2013	Mount Lemmon	Mount Lemmon Survey	·	520 m	MPC · JPL
551810	2013 LC_{14}	—	June 5, 2013	Mount Lemmon	Mount Lemmon Survey	·	1.4 km	MPC · JPL
551811	2013 LY_{15}	—	August 28, 2002	Socorro	LINEAR	T_{j} (2.95)	2.8 km	MPC · JPL
551812	2013 LS_{16}	—	June 1, 2013	Mount Lemmon	Mount Lemmon Survey	·	1.2 km	MPC · JPL
551813	2013 LY_{17}	—	July 13, 2001	Palomar	NEAT	·	1.5 km	MPC · JPL
551814	2013 LH_{20}	—	October 17, 2010	Mount Lemmon	Mount Lemmon Survey	·	1.0 km	MPC · JPL
551815	2013 LJ_{20}	—	June 1, 2013	Haleakala	Pan-STARRS 1	·	1.5 km	MPC · JPL
551816	2013 LN_{22}	—	August 17, 2009	Kitt Peak	Spacewatch	·	1.2 km	MPC · JPL
551817	2013 LS_{23}	—	July 27, 2001	Palomar	NEAT	(5)	1.4 km	MPC · JPL
551818	2013 LC_{28}	—	January 26, 2003	Palomar	NEAT	526	2.5 km	MPC · JPL
551819	2013 LQ_{28}	—	May 12, 2013	Mount Lemmon	Mount Lemmon Survey	·	1.6 km	MPC · JPL
551820	2013 LR_{30}	—	June 12, 2013	Haleakala	Pan-STARRS 1	·	1.7 km	MPC · JPL
551821	2013 LD_{31}	—	January 28, 2004	Apache Point	SDSS Collaboration	H	760 m	MPC · JPL
551822	2013 LQ_{31}	—	June 10, 2013	Mount Lemmon	Mount Lemmon Survey	·	450 m	MPC · JPL
551823	2013 LU_{31}	—	September 29, 2009	Mount Lemmon	Mount Lemmon Survey	·	4.0 km	MPC · JPL
551824	2013 LX_{33}	—	June 1, 2013	Catalina	CSS	·	1.5 km	MPC · JPL
551825	2013 LK_{34}	—	May 17, 2013	Nogales	M. Schwartz, P. R. Holvorcem	·	2.1 km	MPC · JPL
551826	2013 LW_{34}	—	November 12, 2010	Mount Lemmon	Mount Lemmon Survey	MAR	1.2 km	MPC · JPL
551827	2013 LB_{36}	—	December 1, 2011	Haleakala	Pan-STARRS 1	H	480 m	MPC · JPL
551828	2013 LD_{37}	—	June 11, 2013	Mount Lemmon	Mount Lemmon Survey	EUN	1.1 km	MPC · JPL
551829	2013 LG_{37}	—	June 12, 2013	Haleakala	Pan-STARRS 1	·	520 m	MPC · JPL
551830	2013 LL_{37}	—	June 12, 2013	Haleakala	Pan-STARRS 1	EUN	910 m	MPC · JPL
551831	2013 LO_{37}	—	September 23, 2015	Haleakala	Pan-STARRS 1	NAE	2.2 km	MPC · JPL
551832	2013 LP_{37}	—	June 6, 2013	Mount Lemmon	Mount Lemmon Survey	H	420 m	MPC · JPL
551833	2013 MT_{1}	—	May 11, 2013	Mount Lemmon	Mount Lemmon Survey	·	490 m	MPC · JPL
551834	2013 MG_{2}	—	June 16, 2013	Haleakala	Pan-STARRS 1	·	1.0 km	MPC · JPL
551835	2013 MN_{2}	—	September 19, 2000	Kitt Peak	Spacewatch	·	530 m	MPC · JPL
551836	2013 MQ_{2}	—	August 30, 2005	Palomar	NEAT	·	1.5 km	MPC · JPL
551837	2013 ME_{3}	—	January 15, 2004	Kitt Peak	Spacewatch	·	940 m	MPC · JPL
551838	2013 MJ_{9}	—	May 22, 2013	Mount Lemmon	Mount Lemmon Survey	·	1.1 km	MPC · JPL
551839	2013 ML_{11}	—	September 6, 2008	Mount Lemmon	Mount Lemmon Survey	·	2.0 km	MPC · JPL
551840	2013 MP_{12}	—	February 27, 2012	Haleakala	Pan-STARRS 1	MRX	760 m	MPC · JPL
551841	2013 NB	—	August 19, 2010	XuYi	PMO NEO Survey Program	·	710 m	MPC · JPL
551842	2013 NY	—	August 30, 2005	Kitt Peak	Spacewatch	·	1.0 km	MPC · JPL
551843	2013 NB_{3}	—	March 7, 1981	Siding Spring	S. J. Bus	·	2.4 km	MPC · JPL
551844	2013 NO_{3}	—	January 2, 2011	Mount Lemmon	Mount Lemmon Survey	·	2.0 km	MPC · JPL
551845	2013 NY_{3}	—	December 13, 2010	Mount Lemmon	Mount Lemmon Survey	·	3.5 km	MPC · JPL
551846	2013 NX_{6}	—	September 9, 2010	Kitt Peak	Spacewatch	·	630 m	MPC · JPL
551847	2013 NM_{7}	—	December 10, 2005	Kitt Peak	Spacewatch	EOS	2.4 km	MPC · JPL
551848	2013 NC_{8}	—	March 23, 2006	Kitt Peak	Spacewatch	·	530 m	MPC · JPL
551849	2013 NB_{11}	—	October 29, 2005	Catalina	CSS	·	2.6 km	MPC · JPL
551850	2013 NZ_{12}	—	July 10, 2013	Elena Remote	Oreshko, A.	·	2.3 km	MPC · JPL
551851	2013 NZ_{17}	—	July 13, 2013	Mount Lemmon	Mount Lemmon Survey	·	3.1 km	MPC · JPL
551852	2013 NV_{22}	—	July 17, 2004	Palomar	NEAT	·	2.2 km	MPC · JPL
551853	2013 NU_{25}	—	January 26, 2006	Mount Lemmon	Mount Lemmon Survey	AGN	1.1 km	MPC · JPL
551854	2013 NH_{26}	—	August 8, 2004	Palomar	NEAT	·	1.5 km	MPC · JPL
551855	2013 NX_{26}	—	February 25, 2011	Mount Lemmon	Mount Lemmon Survey	·	1.5 km	MPC · JPL
551856	2013 NC_{28}	—	February 6, 2002	Kitt Peak	Spacewatch	·	1.5 km	MPC · JPL
551857	2013 NO_{30}	—	April 27, 2012	Haleakala	Pan-STARRS 1	·	1.6 km	MPC · JPL
551858	2013 NX_{30}	—	January 23, 2006	Kitt Peak	Spacewatch	·	1.4 km	MPC · JPL
551859	2013 NR_{31}	—	September 26, 2009	Kitt Peak	Spacewatch	AGN	920 m	MPC · JPL
551860	2013 NL_{32}	—	September 28, 2009	Kitt Peak	Spacewatch	·	1.8 km	MPC · JPL
551861	2013 NR_{35}	—	September 2, 2014	Haleakala	Pan-STARRS 1	·	1.8 km	MPC · JPL
551862	2013 NS_{38}	—	January 28, 2004	Kitt Peak	Spacewatch	EUP	2.6 km	MPC · JPL
551863	2013 NV_{39}	—	August 3, 2014	Haleakala	Pan-STARRS 1	HNS	840 m	MPC · JPL
551864	2013 NT_{43}	—	January 22, 1998	Kitt Peak	Spacewatch	THB	2.4 km	MPC · JPL
551865	2013 NT_{45}	—	July 15, 2013	Haleakala	Pan-STARRS 1	·	2.3 km	MPC · JPL
551866	2013 NV_{48}	—	July 13, 2013	Haleakala	Pan-STARRS 1	·	720 m	MPC · JPL
551867	2013 NK_{49}	—	July 13, 2013	Haleakala	Pan-STARRS 1	L5	10 km	MPC · JPL
551868	2013 NW_{50}	—	July 14, 2013	Haleakala	Pan-STARRS 1	V	480 m	MPC · JPL
551869	2013 OG_{3}	—	July 1, 2013	Haleakala	Pan-STARRS 1	·	730 m	MPC · JPL
551870	2013 OA_{4}	—	June 15, 2007	Kitt Peak	Spacewatch	·	3.8 km	MPC · JPL
551871	2013 OH_{4}	—	October 26, 2005	Kitt Peak	Spacewatch	·	1.8 km	MPC · JPL
551872	2013 OX_{6}	—	March 21, 2009	Mount Lemmon	Mount Lemmon Survey	·	430 m	MPC · JPL
551873	2013 OB_{8}	—	August 17, 2006	Palomar	NEAT	·	640 m	MPC · JPL
551874	2013 OP_{9}	—	June 30, 2013	Haleakala	Pan-STARRS 1	·	2.2 km	MPC · JPL
551875	2013 OQ_{10}	—	September 25, 2005	Kitt Peak	Spacewatch	MAR	1.0 km	MPC · JPL
551876	2013 OM_{15}	—	November 30, 2014	Haleakala	Pan-STARRS 1	·	2.0 km	MPC · JPL
551877	2013 PQ	—	April 15, 2001	Kitt Peak	Spacewatch	EOS	1.9 km	MPC · JPL
551878 Stoeger	2013 PF_{2}	Stoeger	February 29, 2012	Mount Graham	K. Černis, R. P. Boyle	·	2.0 km	MPC · JPL
551879	2013 PY_{8}	—	August 3, 2013	Haleakala	Pan-STARRS 1	·	2.3 km	MPC · JPL
551880	2013 PO_{10}	—	February 13, 2012	Haleakala	Pan-STARRS 1	·	1.0 km	MPC · JPL
551881	2013 PD_{14}	—	August 15, 2004	Campo Imperatore	CINEOS	·	2.1 km	MPC · JPL
551882	2013 PD_{15}	—	July 14, 2013	Haleakala	Pan-STARRS 1	·	1.7 km	MPC · JPL
551883	2013 PY_{15}	—	December 1, 2000	Kitt Peak	Spacewatch	AGN	1.3 km	MPC · JPL
551884	2013 PZ_{15}	—	October 17, 2006	Catalina	CSS	·	810 m	MPC · JPL
551885	2013 PZ_{17}	—	March 16, 2012	Mount Lemmon	Mount Lemmon Survey	·	1.6 km	MPC · JPL
551886	2013 PK_{22}	—	September 21, 2003	Kitt Peak	Spacewatch	·	2.1 km	MPC · JPL
551887	2013 PT_{26}	—	November 19, 2003	Socorro	LINEAR	·	830 m	MPC · JPL
551888	2013 PE_{27}	—	August 8, 2013	Kitt Peak	Spacewatch	·	2.1 km	MPC · JPL
551889	2013 PT_{28}	—	March 9, 2005	Mount Lemmon	Mount Lemmon Survey	·	2.5 km	MPC · JPL
551890	2013 PL_{29}	—	August 16, 2006	Palomar	NEAT	·	640 m	MPC · JPL
551891	2013 PE_{30}	—	November 13, 2010	Kitt Peak	Spacewatch	·	640 m	MPC · JPL
551892	2013 PF_{33}	—	January 30, 2008	Mount Lemmon	Mount Lemmon Survey	·	940 m	MPC · JPL
551893	2013 PG_{33}	—	April 20, 2012	Siding Spring	SSS	·	1.9 km	MPC · JPL
551894	2013 PK_{35}	—	September 23, 2003	Haleakala	NEAT	·	3.1 km	MPC · JPL
551895	2013 PL_{36}	—	July 14, 2013	Haleakala	Pan-STARRS 1	·	690 m	MPC · JPL
551896	2013 PQ_{36}	—	March 16, 2012	Catalina	CSS	(18466)	2.6 km	MPC · JPL
551897	2013 PO_{37}	—	November 21, 2008	Kitt Peak	Spacewatch	EUP	2.8 km	MPC · JPL
551898	2013 PT_{39}	—	August 9, 2013	Kitt Peak	Spacewatch	L5	7.2 km	MPC · JPL
551899	2013 PE_{40}	—	October 13, 2010	Mount Lemmon	Mount Lemmon Survey	·	1.0 km	MPC · JPL
551900 Laneways	2013 PJ_{40}	Laneways	August 10, 2013	iTelescope	Lake, P. B.	TIN	1.1 km	MPC · JPL

== 551901–552000 ==
back to top

Designation			Discovery			Properties		Ref
Permanent	Provisional	Named after	Date	Site	Discoverer(s)	Category	Diam.	Ref
551901	2013 PG_{42}	—	August 28, 2003	Palomar	NEAT	·	2.4 km	MPC · JPL
551902	2013 PV_{42}	—	September 23, 2008	Kitt Peak	Spacewatch	·	2.4 km	MPC · JPL
551903	2013 PO_{51}	—	February 12, 2004	Kitt Peak	Spacewatch	·	3.1 km	MPC · JPL
551904	2013 PT_{58}	—	September 19, 2009	Kitt Peak	Spacewatch	·	1.5 km	MPC · JPL
551905	2013 PS_{59}	—	September 30, 2003	Kitt Peak	Spacewatch	·	1.8 km	MPC · JPL
551906	2013 PO_{60}	—	December 6, 2011	Haleakala	Pan-STARRS 1	·	2.4 km	MPC · JPL
551907	2013 PQ_{63}	—	July 15, 2013	Haleakala	Pan-STARRS 1	·	1.7 km	MPC · JPL
551908	2013 PP_{67}	—	August 31, 2000	Socorro	LINEAR	·	1.5 km	MPC · JPL
551909	2013 PV_{69}	—	August 4, 2013	Haleakala	Pan-STARRS 1	·	690 m	MPC · JPL
551910	2013 PD_{76}	—	October 27, 2009	Mount Lemmon	Mount Lemmon Survey	·	1.5 km	MPC · JPL
551911	2013 PM_{76}	—	February 25, 2006	Mount Lemmon	Mount Lemmon Survey	KOR	1.1 km	MPC · JPL
551912	2013 PD_{77}	—	July 29, 2008	Kitt Peak	Spacewatch	KOR	1.3 km	MPC · JPL
551913	2013 PK_{77}	—	February 13, 2011	Mount Lemmon	Mount Lemmon Survey	KOR	1.2 km	MPC · JPL
551914	2013 PU_{78}	—	February 13, 2011	Mount Lemmon	Mount Lemmon Survey	KOR	1.2 km	MPC · JPL
551915	2013 PM_{79}	—	August 7, 2013	ESA OGS	ESA OGS	·	1.8 km	MPC · JPL
551916	2013 PM_{81}	—	November 1, 2010	Mount Lemmon	Mount Lemmon Survey	·	640 m	MPC · JPL
551917	2013 PH_{82}	—	August 15, 2013	Haleakala	Pan-STARRS 1	·	1.2 km	MPC · JPL
551918	2013 PC_{83}	—	January 12, 2011	Mount Lemmon	Mount Lemmon Survey	·	1.9 km	MPC · JPL
551919	2013 PQ_{86}	—	August 15, 2013	Haleakala	Pan-STARRS 1	·	570 m	MPC · JPL
551920	2013 PA_{91}	—	November 15, 2003	Kitt Peak	Spacewatch	·	1.9 km	MPC · JPL
551921	2013 PD_{91}	—	August 12, 2013	Haleakala	Pan-STARRS 1	·	2.4 km	MPC · JPL
551922	2013 PK_{91}	—	August 14, 2013	Haleakala	Pan-STARRS 1	TIR	2.3 km	MPC · JPL
551923	2013 PN_{91}	—	September 27, 2008	Mount Lemmon	Mount Lemmon Survey	·	1.9 km	MPC · JPL
551924	2013 PP_{91}	—	November 28, 2014	Haleakala	Pan-STARRS 1	·	1.3 km	MPC · JPL
551925	2013 PR_{98}	—	August 15, 2013	Haleakala	Pan-STARRS 1	·	1.7 km	MPC · JPL
551926	2013 PP_{100}	—	August 8, 2013	Haleakala	Pan-STARRS 1	·	1.6 km	MPC · JPL
551927	2013 PM_{101}	—	August 14, 2013	Haleakala	Pan-STARRS 1	·	2.1 km	MPC · JPL
551928	2013 PF_{102}	—	August 14, 2013	Haleakala	Pan-STARRS 1	·	580 m	MPC · JPL
551929	2013 PP_{105}	—	August 8, 2013	Haleakala	Pan-STARRS 1	·	1.6 km	MPC · JPL
551930	2013 PV_{108}	—	August 9, 2013	Kitt Peak	Spacewatch	·	620 m	MPC · JPL
551931	2013 QF	—	August 8, 2013	Haleakala	Pan-STARRS 1	AGN	900 m	MPC · JPL
551932	2013 QC_{1}	—	November 26, 2005	Kitt Peak	Spacewatch	·	1.5 km	MPC · JPL
551933	2013 QE_{1}	—	January 25, 2003	La Silla	A. Boattini, Hainaut, O.	·	1.8 km	MPC · JPL
551934	2013 QF_{1}	—	October 22, 2003	Kitt Peak	Spacewatch	·	2.0 km	MPC · JPL
551935	2013 QL_{4}	—	September 23, 2003	Palomar	NEAT	·	590 m	MPC · JPL
551936	2013 QO_{6}	—	July 8, 2013	Siding Spring	SSS	H	560 m	MPC · JPL
551937	2013 QK_{7}	—	October 20, 2003	Kitt Peak	Spacewatch	TEL	1.5 km	MPC · JPL
551938	2013 QP_{8}	—	August 12, 2013	Kitt Peak	Spacewatch	·	1.7 km	MPC · JPL
551939	2013 QH_{9}	—	September 18, 2003	Kitt Peak	Spacewatch	·	1.4 km	MPC · JPL
551940	2013 QJ_{9}	—	September 4, 2008	Kitt Peak	Spacewatch	·	1.9 km	MPC · JPL
551941	2013 QA_{11}	—	September 4, 2010	Kitt Peak	Spacewatch	·	600 m	MPC · JPL
551942	2013 QX_{11}	—	August 26, 2013	Haleakala	Pan-STARRS 1	·	2.1 km	MPC · JPL
551943	2013 QY_{11}	—	October 13, 1999	Apache Point	SDSS Collaboration	V	480 m	MPC · JPL
551944	2013 QE_{14}	—	August 27, 2006	Anderson Mesa	LONEOS	(2076)	790 m	MPC · JPL
551945	2013 QQ_{20}	—	February 4, 2006	Kitt Peak	Spacewatch	KOR	1.5 km	MPC · JPL
551946	2013 QR_{20}	—	March 6, 2011	Mount Lemmon	Mount Lemmon Survey	·	2.0 km	MPC · JPL
551947	2013 QT_{21}	—	April 2, 2011	Kitt Peak	Spacewatch	·	2.4 km	MPC · JPL
551948	2013 QV_{21}	—	December 28, 2005	Kitt Peak	Spacewatch	·	1.7 km	MPC · JPL
551949	2013 QF_{22}	—	September 6, 2008	Mount Lemmon	Mount Lemmon Survey	·	2.4 km	MPC · JPL
551950	2013 QS_{23}	—	February 23, 2007	Mount Lemmon	Mount Lemmon Survey	·	2.7 km	MPC · JPL
551951	2013 QM_{25}	—	January 8, 2006	Mount Lemmon	Mount Lemmon Survey	KOR	1.4 km	MPC · JPL
551952	2013 QS_{25}	—	December 3, 2005	Kitt Peak	Spacewatch	·	1.6 km	MPC · JPL
551953	2013 QX_{26}	—	August 21, 2004	Siding Spring	SSS	·	1.9 km	MPC · JPL
551954	2013 QY_{30}	—	April 24, 2012	Haleakala	Pan-STARRS 1	·	1.9 km	MPC · JPL
551955	2013 QB_{31}	—	October 31, 2010	Kitt Peak	Spacewatch	·	590 m	MPC · JPL
551956	2013 QO_{36}	—	August 9, 2013	Kitt Peak	Spacewatch	·	1.6 km	MPC · JPL
551957	2013 QW_{36}	—	August 26, 2013	Haleakala	Pan-STARRS 1	BRA	1.2 km	MPC · JPL
551958	2013 QM_{44}	—	August 15, 2013	Haleakala	Pan-STARRS 1	·	860 m	MPC · JPL
551959	2013 QY_{44}	—	January 28, 2007	Mount Lemmon	Mount Lemmon Survey	·	1.3 km	MPC · JPL
551960	2013 QM_{50}	—	October 16, 2002	Palomar	NEAT	TIR	2.7 km	MPC · JPL
551961	2013 QP_{50}	—	February 25, 2011	Kitt Peak	Spacewatch	EOS	1.8 km	MPC · JPL
551962	2013 QL_{52}	—	November 6, 2008	Mount Lemmon	Mount Lemmon Survey	·	2.7 km	MPC · JPL
551963	2013 QU_{52}	—	January 30, 2011	Haleakala	Pan-STARRS 1	·	1.4 km	MPC · JPL
551964	2013 QO_{57}	—	August 14, 2013	Haleakala	Pan-STARRS 1	·	2.0 km	MPC · JPL
551965	2013 QZ_{58}	—	August 26, 2013	Haleakala	Pan-STARRS 1	·	1.5 km	MPC · JPL
551966	2013 QO_{59}	—	August 9, 2013	Kitt Peak	Spacewatch	·	1.5 km	MPC · JPL
551967	2013 QH_{62}	—	April 1, 2003	Apache Point	SDSS Collaboration	·	1.8 km	MPC · JPL
551968	2013 QT_{62}	—	August 29, 2002	Palomar	NEAT	·	3.2 km	MPC · JPL
551969	2013 QW_{62}	—	October 14, 2009	Mount Lemmon	Mount Lemmon Survey	·	1.5 km	MPC · JPL
551970	2013 QA_{63}	—	August 9, 2013	Haleakala	Pan-STARRS 1	·	1.9 km	MPC · JPL
551971	2013 QO_{68}	—	August 4, 2003	Kitt Peak	Spacewatch	·	2.1 km	MPC · JPL
551972	2013 QQ_{68}	—	August 8, 2013	Kitt Peak	Spacewatch	·	3.3 km	MPC · JPL
551973	2013 QO_{69}	—	September 3, 2002	Palomar	NEAT	T_{j} (2.96)	2.6 km	MPC · JPL
551974	2013 QS_{69}	—	June 20, 2013	Mount Lemmon	Mount Lemmon Survey	·	570 m	MPC · JPL
551975	2013 QZ_{73}	—	August 26, 2013	Haleakala	Pan-STARRS 1	·	910 m	MPC · JPL
551976	2013 QA_{75}	—	September 22, 2003	Kitt Peak	Spacewatch	·	600 m	MPC · JPL
551977	2013 QO_{75}	—	December 1, 2005	Kitt Peak	Wasserman, L. H., Millis, R. L.	·	2.4 km	MPC · JPL
551978	2013 QB_{77}	—	January 13, 2011	Mount Lemmon	Mount Lemmon Survey	BRA	1.4 km	MPC · JPL
551979	2013 QN_{83}	—	October 23, 2006	Catalina	CSS	·	920 m	MPC · JPL
551980	2013 RY_{9}	—	February 14, 2010	Mount Lemmon	Mount Lemmon Survey	EOS	1.9 km	MPC · JPL
551981	2013 RB_{11}	—	August 9, 2013	Kitt Peak	Spacewatch	·	670 m	MPC · JPL
551982	2013 RV_{13}	—	March 7, 2003	Socorro	LINEAR	·	1.6 km	MPC · JPL
551983	2013 RP_{18}	—	September 12, 2002	Palomar	NEAT	·	3.7 km	MPC · JPL
551984	2013 RD_{19}	—	August 12, 2013	Kitt Peak	Spacewatch	·	760 m	MPC · JPL
551985	2013 RM_{19}	—	August 3, 2008	Charleston	R. Holmes	·	2.3 km	MPC · JPL
551986	2013 RQ_{21}	—	May 4, 2000	Apache Point	SDSS	EUP	3.2 km	MPC · JPL
551987	2013 RS_{21}	—	August 16, 2002	Palomar	NEAT	V	600 m	MPC · JPL
551988	2013 RQ_{22}	—	September 2, 2013	Mount Lemmon	Mount Lemmon Survey	·	2.4 km	MPC · JPL
551989	2013 RA_{23}	—	September 3, 2013	Haleakala	Pan-STARRS 1	V	390 m	MPC · JPL
551990	2013 RS_{23}	—	October 15, 2006	Kitt Peak	Spacewatch	·	790 m	MPC · JPL
551991	2013 RY_{24}	—	March 3, 2005	Kitt Peak	Spacewatch	·	890 m	MPC · JPL
551992	2013 RX_{26}	—	September 18, 2003	Kitt Peak	Spacewatch	KOR	1.0 km	MPC · JPL
551993	2013 RT_{30}	—	September 7, 2004	Palomar	NEAT	·	1.8 km	MPC · JPL
551994	2013 RK_{32}	—	March 15, 2007	San Marcello	San Marcello	H	560 m	MPC · JPL
551995	2013 RD_{42}	—	November 1, 1999	Kitt Peak	Spacewatch	615	1.3 km	MPC · JPL
551996	2013 RC_{44}	—	January 17, 2005	Kitt Peak	Spacewatch	·	3.3 km	MPC · JPL
551997	2013 RX_{44}	—	April 28, 2003	Anderson Mesa	LONEOS	·	2.7 km	MPC · JPL
551998	2013 RL_{45}	—	September 9, 2013	Haleakala	Pan-STARRS 1	EOS	1.6 km	MPC · JPL
551999	2013 RV_{47}	—	September 22, 2008	Kitt Peak	Spacewatch	·	1.9 km	MPC · JPL
552000	2013 RX_{49}	—	October 8, 2008	Mount Lemmon	Mount Lemmon Survey	EOS	1.5 km	MPC · JPL

back to top

== Meaning of names ==
As minor planet discoveries are confirmed, they are given a permanent number by the IAU's Minor Planet Center (MPC), and the discoverers can then submit names for them, following the IAU's naming conventions. The list below concerns those minor planets in the specified number-range that have received names, and explains the meanings of those names.

Official naming citations of newly named small Solar System bodies are approved and published in a bulletin by IAU's Working Group for Small Bodies Nomenclature (WGSBN). Before May 2021, citations were published in MPC's Minor Planet Circulars for many decades. Recent citations can also be found on the JPL Small-Body Database (SBDB). Until his death in 2016, German astronomer Lutz D. Schmadel compiled these citations into the Dictionary of Minor Planet Names (DMP) and regularly updated the collection.

Based on Paul Herget's The Names of the Minor Planets, Schmadel also researched the unclear origin of numerous asteroids, most of which had been named prior to World War II. This article incorporates text from this source, which is in the public domain: SBDB New namings may only be added to this list below after official publication as the preannouncement of names is condemned. The WGSBN publishes a comprehensive guideline for the naming rules of non-cometary small Solar System bodies.

Named minor planet	Provisional	This minor planet was named for...	Ref · Catalog
551014 Gorman	2012 UU_{185}	Alice Gorman (born 1964) is an Australian archaeologist, a pioneer in the field of space archaeology.	IAU · 551014
551082 Tsiongtiong	2012 VD_{78}	Tsiong-Tiong, Taiwanese abbreviation for Changhua Senior High School.	IAU · 551082
551091 Flórferenc	2012 VZ_{98}	Ferenc Flór (1809–1871) was a doctor and medical writer, as well as a corresponding member of the Hungarian Academy of Sciences. He was one of the founders of public health in Hungary and he called for the construction of a clean water supply network in Budapest.	IAU · 551091
551212 Mathieuudriot	2012 YL_{6}	Mathieu Udriot, Swiss engineer specializing in space technologies.	IAU · 551212
551231 Żywiec	2013 AT_{24}	Żywiec is a town in southern Poland.	IAU · 551231
551233 Miguelanton	2013 AN_{27}	Miguel Anton (1950–2021) was a Spanish chemist, mathematician and programmer, and a friend of astronomer Rafael Ferrando, who co-discovered this minor planet.	IAU · 551233
551390 Thomaskeßler	2013 CK_{50}	Tax consultant Thomas Keßler (b. 1953) is an amateur astronomer and a good friend of the discoverer. He was the treasurer of the Vereinigung der Sternfreunde, the largest German amateur astronomer organization, from 1997 to 2017. His main interests in observing are asteroids.	IAU · 551390
551510 Mariuszkukava	2013 EG_{53}	Mariusz Kukava (1964–2022), involved in the International Asteroid Search Collaboration from 2008.	IAU · 551510
551601 Antonijové	2013 GN_{34}	Antoni Jové Reina (born 1978) is an electromechanic expert. He built the Santa Maria de Montmagastrell Remote Observatory in 2017 according to the discoverer's design. Jové later built four more remote observatories, using his own electronics design and self-written software.	IAU · 551601
551878 Stoeger	2013 PF_{2}	William R. Stoeger (1943–2014), an American Jesuit priest at the Vatican Observatory. he co-edited a series of academic conference proceedings on science and theology.	IAU · 551878
551900 Laneways	2013 PJ_{40}	Laneways, which are narrow streets and pedestrian paths, are the heart of the street culture in Melbourne, Australia.	IAU · 551900
