= Nancey Murphy =

American philosopher and theologian (born 1951)

- Born: June 12, 1951 (age 75)
- Education: Creighton University; University of California, Berkeley; Graduate Theological Union
- Occupations: Philosopher and theologian
- Employer: Fuller Theological Seminary

Nancey Murphy (born 12 June 1951) is an American philosopher and theologian who is Professor of Christian Philosophy at Fuller Theological Seminary in Pasadena, California.

== Education ==
Murphy received a B.A. degree from Creighton University (philosophy and psychology) in 1973, a Ph.D. from University of California, Berkeley (philosophy of science) in 1980, and a Th.D. from the Graduate Theological Union (theology) in 1987.

== Career ==
Murphy's research interests focus on the role of modern and postmodern philosophy in shaping Christian theology; on relations between theology and science; and most recently on philosophy of mind and neuroscience. Her first book, Theology in the Age of Scientific Reasoning (Cornell, 1990) won the American Academy of Religion award for excellence. She is author of nine other books, including Anglo-American Postmodernity: Philosophical Perspectives on Science, Religion, and Ethics (Westview, 1997); and On the Moral Nature of the Universe: Theology, Cosmology, and Ethics (with G. F. R. Ellis, Fortress, 1996), the later of which was awarded the Templeton Prize for Progress in Religion. Her most recent books are Bodies and Souls, or Spirited Bodies? (Cambridge, 2006); and (co-authored with Warren Brown) Did My Neurons Make Me Do It? Philosophical and Neurobiological Perspectives on Moral Responsibility and Free Will (Oxford, 2007).

Murphy has co-edited eleven volumes, including (with L. Schultz and R. J. Russell, Brill 2009) Philosophy, Science, and Divine Action; (with G. F. R. Ellis and T. O'Connor, Springer, 2009) Downward Causation and the Neurobiology of Free Will, Springer; and (with W. R. Stoeger, Oxford, 2007) Evolution and Emergence: Systems, Organisms, Persons.

== Professional affiliations ==
Murphy is a member of the board of directors of the Center for Theology and the Natural Sciences (and former chair of the board); the American Philosophical Association; and the Society of Christian Philosophers. She has served as an advisor to the American Association for the Advancement of Science's program on dialogue between science, ethics, and religion, and serves on long-term planning committees for a series of conferences on science and divine action and on the problem of natural evil sponsored by the Vatican Observatory.

In 1998, Murphy was Creighton University's alumnus of the year, and in 2006, GTU Alumnus of the year. She was the 1999 J.K Russell Fellow at the Center for Theology and the Natural Sciences. She was elected to the International Society for Science and Religion and serves on its steering committee. In 2007, she was included in the Los Angeles Magazine 100 most influential people. She is an ordained minister in the Church of the Brethren. '

== Books ==
- 1990. Theology in the Age of Scientific Reasoning, Cornell University Press. ISBN 0-8014-8114-7
- 1994. Reasoning and Rhetoric in Religion, Trinity Press International. ISBN 1-57910-772-9
- 1996. Beyond Liberalism and Fundamentalism: How Modern and Postmodern Philosophy Set the Theological Agenda, Trinity Press International. ISBN 1-56338-176-1
- 1996. (with George F. R. Ellis) On the Moral Nature of the Universe: Theology, Cosmology, and Ethics, Fortress Press. ISBN 0800629833
- 1997. Anglo-American Postmodernity: Philosophical Perspectives on Science, Religion, and Ethics, Westview Press. ISBN 0-8133-2869-1
- 1997. Reconciling Theology and Science: A Radical Reformation Perspective, Pandora Press. ISBN 0969876246
- 2002. Religion and Science: God, Evolution, and the Soul (ed. Carl S. Helrich), Pandora Press.
- 2006. Bodies and Souls, or Spirited Bodies? Cambridge University Press. ISBN 0-521-67676-2
- 2007. (with W. S. Brown) Did My Neurons Make Me Do It?: Philosophical and Neurobiological Perspectives on Moral Responsibility and Free Will, Oxford University Press. ISBN 0-19-956823-5
- 2018. A Philosophy of the Christian Religion for the Twenty-First Century, SPCK. ISBN 978-0-281-06692-6

== Edited volumes ==
- 1993. (with R. J. Russell and C. J. Isham, eds) Quantum Cosmology and the Laws of Nature: Divine Action in Scientific Perspective, Vatican Observatory Press.
- 1994. (with S. Hauerwas and M. Nation, eds) Theology without Foundations: Religious Practice and the Future of Theological Truth, Abingdon Press.
- 1995. (with R. J. Russell and A. R. Peacocke, eds) Chaos and Complexity: Scientific Perspectives on Divine Action, Vatican Observatory Press.
- 1997. (with B. J. Kallenberg and M. Nation, eds.) Virtues and Practices in the Christian Tradition:Christian Ethics after MacIntyre, Trinity Press International.
- 1998. (with W. S. Brown and H. N. Malony, eds.) Whatever Happened to the Soul?: Scientific and Theological Portraits of Human Nature, Fortress Press.
- 1999. (with R. J. Russell, T. C. Meyering, and M. A. Arbib, eds) Neuroscience and the Person: Scientific Perspectives on Divine Action, Vatican Observatory Press.
- 2007. (with R. J. Russell and W. R. Stoeger, eds) Physics and Cosmology: Scientific Perspectives on Suffering in Nature, Vatican Observatory Press.
- 2007. (with W. R. Stoeger, ed.) Evolution and Emergence: Systems, Organism, Persons, Oxford University Press.
- 2008. (with R. J. Russell and W. R. Stoeger, eds) Scientific Perspectives on Divine Action: Twenty Years of Problems and Progress, Vatican Observatory Press.
- 2009. (with G. F. R. Ellis and T. W. O'Connor, eds.) Downward Causation and the Neurobiology of Free Will, Springer.
- 2009. (with F. L. Shults and R.J. Russell, eds) Philosophy, Science, and Divine Action, Brill.
- 2010. (with C. C. Knight, ed.) Human Identity at the Intersection of Science, Technology, and Religion, Ashgate.

== Contributions to scholarly texts ==
- 2007. "Science, Divine Action, and the Intelligent Design Movement: A Defense of Theistic Evolution", in R. B. Stewart, ed., Intelligent Design: William A. Dembski and Michael Ruse in Dialogue, Fortress Press.
- 2008. "MacIntyre, Tradition-Dependent Rationality and the End of Philosophy of Religion", in D. Cheetham and R. King, eds, Contemporary Method and Practice in the Philosophy of Religion: New Essays, Continuum Press.
- 2008. "Neuroscience, Determinism, and Downward Causation: Defusing the Free-Will Problem", in F. Watts, ed., Creation: Law and Probability, Ashgate.
- 2008. (with J. Schloss) "Biology and Religion", in M. Ruse, ed., Oxford Handbook of Biology, Oxford University Press.
- 2008. (with V. Ignatkof) "Atheism", and "Epistemology", in W. Dyrness and V-M. Karkkainen, eds, Global Dictionary of Theology, IVP.
- 2009. "Adolf Grünbaum on Religion, Cosmology, and Morals", in A Jokic, ed., Philosophy, Religion, Physics, and Psychology: Essays in Honor of Adolf Grünbaum, Promethius Books.
- 2009. "Agape and Nonviolence", in Craig Boyd, ed., Visions of Agape, Ashgate.
- 2009. "Non-reductive Physicalism and Free Will", in E. Weislogal, ed., Transdisciplinarity in Science and Religion, Curtea Veche Publishing House.
- 2009. "Reduction and Emergence: A Critical Perspective", in W. Van Huyysteen et al., eds, Understanding Humans in a Scientific Age, Ashgate.
- 2009. "The Cognitive Science of Religion: A Theological Appropriation", in J. Schloss, and M. J. Murray, eds, The Spiritual Primate: Scientific, Philosophical and Theological Perspectives on the Origin of Religion, Oxford University Press.
- 2009. "The Role of Philosophy in the Science/Religion Dialogue," and "Supervenience" in H. A. Campbell and H. Looy, eds, A Science and Religion Primer, Baker.
- 2010. "Divine Action, Emergence, and Scientific Explanation", in Peter Harrison, ed., Cambridge Companion to Science and Religion.
- 2010. "Nonreductive Physicalism", in A. Runehov, ed., Encyclopedia of Sciences and Religions, Springer.
- 2010. "Reduction and Emergence: A Critical Perspective", in N. Murphy and C. Knight, eds, Human Identity at the Intersection of Science, Technology, and Religion, Ashgate.
- 2010. "Theology and Science in a Postmodern Context"; "Science and Divine Action"; and "Theology, Science and Human Nature", in M. Stewart, ed., Science and Religion in Dialogue, vol. 2, Wiley-Blackwell (also published in Chinese).

== Selected journal articles ==
- 2002. "Divine Creation and Cosmology", Acta Philosophia: Rivista Internazionale de Filosofia.
- 2002. "The Problem of Mental Causation: How Does Reason Get Its Grip on the Brain?", Science and Christian Belief, October.
- 2003. "On the Role of Philosophy in Theology-Science Dialogue", Theology and Science, 1,1.
- 2003. "Whatever Happened to the Soul?: Theological Perspectives on Neuroscience and the Self", in J. LeDoux et al., eds, The Self: From Soul to Brain, vol. 1001 of Annals of the New York Academy of Science.
- 2006. "Scientific Perspectives on Christian Anthropology", Reflections: Center of Theological Inquiry, spring.
- 2008. "Miks Teadus Vajab Teologiat?" (Estonian translation of "Why Science Needs Theology") Usuteaduslik Ajakiri 57, 1.
- 2008. "On the Role of Philosophy in Theology-Science Dialogue", in J. J. Vila-Cha, ed., Filosofia e Ciencia: Science in Philosophy, Revista Portuguesa de Filosofia.
- 2009. "How to Keep the 'Non' in Nonreductive Physicalism", Journal of European Baptist Studies, 9, 2.
- 2010. "Christianity and Modern Science in the West: An Overview", Omega: Indian Journal of Science and Religion.
- 2010. "Cosmopolis: How Astronomy Affects Philosophies of Human Nature and Religion", in Analecta Husserliana.

== Selected public appearances ==
- 2008. "Is 'Nonreductive Physicalism' an Oxymoron?", American Philosophical Association, Philadelphia.
- 2009. "Anglo-American Postmodern Philosophy—Really?" and "Why Christians Should Be Physicalists", Jellema Lectures, Calvin College.
- 2009. "Bodies and Souls, or Spirited Bodies?", presented at International Conference of Life Education, National Taiwan University.
- 2009. "Bodies and Souls, or Spirited Bodies?", Witherspoon Lecture, Queen's University.
- 2009. "Cosmopolis: How Astronomy Shapes Religion and Philosophies of Human Nature", Astronomy and Civilization Conference, Budapest.
- 2010. "Do Christians Need Souls?: Current Debates on Neuroscience and Human Nature"; and "Moral Responsibility and Free Will: Neurobiological Perspectives", presented at Southern Oregon University.
- 2010. "Some Reflections on Physicalism", presented at the Evangelical Theological Society meeting, Tacoma, WA.
