= William R. Stoeger =

American astronomer and theologian

William R. Stoeger SJ (October 5, 1943 – March 24, 2014) was an American astronomer and theologian.

== Biography ==
William Stoeger was born on October 5, 1943, at Torrance Memorial Hospital in Torrance, California. His father was named Richard Q. Stoeger. William went to high school at Bishop Montgomery High School in Torrance, California and received a bachelor's degree in philosophy at Spring Hill College in Mobile Alabama and a master's in physics at UCLA.

Before studying at Cambridge, he studied theology at the Jesuit School of Theology in Berkeley. He was a staff scientist for the Vatican Observatory Research Group Vatican Observatory in Tucson, specializing in theoretical cosmology, high-energy astrophysics, and interdisciplinary studies relating to science, philosophy and theology.

Fr. Stoeger was ordained a Jesuit priest in 1972. He and his brother, John D. were ordained together. Fr Stoeger earned his Ph.D. in astrophysics in 1976 at Cambridge University, where he was a student of the Astronomer Royal, Baron Martin Rees, and a classmate of Stephen Hawking. He worked on staff at the Vatican Observatory in Tucson from 1979 until his death on March 24, 2014.

The asteroid 551878 Stoeger is named after him.

== Selected works ==
- Physics and Cosmology: Scientific Perspectives on the Problem of Natural Evil co-edited with Nancey Murphy and Robert John Russell, Libreria Editrice Vaticana, 2008, ISBN 88-209-7959-4, 400 pages
- Evolution and Emergence: Systems, Organisms, Persons, co-edited with Nancey Murphy, Oxford University Press, 2007, ISBN 0-19-920471-3, 360 pages
- John Paul II on Science and Religion: Reflections on the New View from Rome co-edited with Robert J. Russell, George V. Coyne, and Pope John Paul II, Vatican Observatory Publications, 1990, ISBN 0-268-01209-1, 122 pages
- Physics, Philosophy, and Theology: A Common Quest for Understanding co-edited with Robert J. Russell and G. V. Coyne, Vatican Observatory, 1988, ISBN 0-268-01576-7, 419 pages
- The Laws of Nature, the Range of Human Knowledge and Divine Action, William R. Stoeger, Biblos, 1996, ISBN 83-85380-94-9, 116 pages
- An Investigation of Crossed-calcite Plate Measures in Cygnus II co-authored with Patrick J. Treanor, Specola vaticana, 1976, 7 pages

== See also ==
- List of Jesuit scientists
- List of Roman Catholic scientist-clerics
