= Closer to Truth =

American TV series

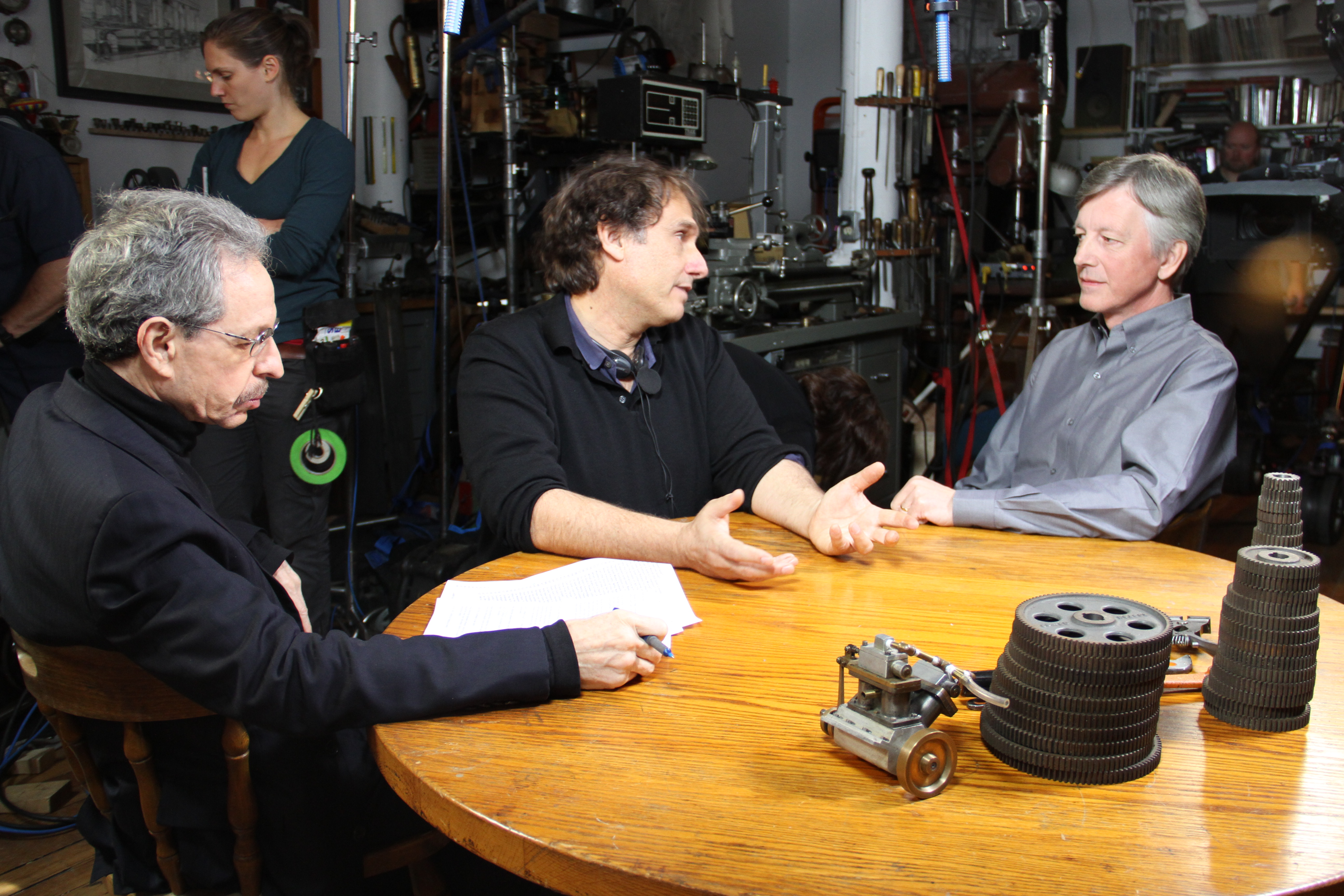
- Robert Lawrence Kuhn, Peter Getzels and J. L. Schellenberg on the set of Closer to Truth
- Also known as: Closer to Truth: Cosmos. Consciousness. Meaning.
- Created by: Robert Lawrence Kuhn
- Written by: Robert Lawrence Kuhn
- Directed by: Peter Getzels
- Presented by: Robert Lawrence Kuhn
- Theme music composer: Joseph Schwantner
- Country of origin: United States
- Original language: English
- No. of seasons: 22
- No. of episodes: 280 (list of episodes)

Production
- Executive producer: Robert Lawrence Kuhn
- Producer: Peter Getzels
- Production companies: The Kuhn Foundation, in association with Getzels Gordon Productions

Original release
- Network: Syndication, PBS
- Release: 2000 – 2024

Closer to Truth is a television series on public television originally created, produced, and hosted by Robert Lawrence Kuhn. The original series aired in 2000 for two seasons, followed by a second series aired in 2003 for a single season. The third series of the program, Closer to Truth: Cosmos. Life. Mind. Meaning., launched in 2008, with 33 seasons to date. Closer to Truth airs on over 200 PBS and public television stations and has had over 200,000 station broadcasts.

The show is centered on on-camera conversations with leading scientists, philosophers, theologians, and scholars, covering a diverse range of topics or questions, from the cause, size and nature of the universe (or multiverse), to the mystery of consciousness and the notion of free will, to the existence and essence of God, to the mystery of existence (i.e., why there is anything at all).

Robert Lawrence Kuhn is the creator, executive producer, writer, and presenter of the series. Peter Getzels is the co-creator, producer, and director.

== Episode list ==
The third series of the program, Closer to Truth: Cosmos. Life. Mind. Meaning. launched in 2008, with 33 full seasons to date. Kuhn is the creator, executive producer, writer and presenter of the series. Peter Getzels is the co-creator and producer / director.

The show is centered on on-camera conversations with leading scientists, philosophers, theologians, and scholars, covering a diverse range of topics or questions from the size and nature of the universe (or multiverse), to the existence and essence of God, to the mystery of consciousness and the notion of free will.

=== Season 22 (2023) ===
No. in Series	No. in Season	Episode Title	Featured Guest / Contributor
271	1	"Why is Mathematics True & Beautiful?"	Robbert Dijkgraaf, Edward Witten, Max Tegmark, Sabine Hossenfelder, Jim Holt
272	2	"Is Mathematical Truth & Beauty Intrinsic or Imposed?"	Paul Davies, Gregory Chaitin, David Chalmers, Michio Kaku, Licia Verde, David Wallace, Leonard Mlodinow
273	3	"Why the 'Unreasonable Effectiveness' of Mathematics?"	Robbert Dijkgraaf, Edward Witten, Sabine Hossenfelder, Leonard Mlodinow, Max Tegmark
274	4	"What does the 'Unreasonable Effectiveness' of Mathematics Mean?"	Michio Kaku, David Wallace, Michael Hopkins, Stuart Kauffman, Jim Holt, Paul Davies
275	5	"What are Breakthroughs in Mathematics?"	Karen Uhlenbeck, Edward Witten, Michael Hopkins, Ivan Corwin, Gregory Chaitin, Paul Davies
276	6	"What's the Deep Meaning of Probability?"	Ivan Corwin, Licia Verde, Sabine Hossenfelder, David Wallace, Aaron Clauset
277	7	"Why do Power Laws Work so Widely?"	Geoffrey West, Stuart Kauffman, Aaron Clauset
278	8	"Can Mathematics Explain Biology?"	Leon Glass, Martin Nowak, Geoffrey West, Paul Davies, Robbert Dijkgraaf
279	9	"Can Mathematics Elucidate Evolution?"	Paul Davies, Aaron Clauset, Martin Nowak, Stuart Kauffman
280	10	"Roger Penrose: Math, Black Holes, Consciousness"	Roger Penrose, Stuart Hameroff

=== Season 21 (2022) ===
No. in Series	No. in Season	Episode Title	Featured Guest / Contributor
258	1	"Freeman Dyson, Part I: From Physics to the Far Future"	Freeman Dyson
259	2	"Freeman Dyson, Part II: Mind, God, Religion"	Freeman Dyson
260	3	"What are Scientific Breakthroughs in Physics?"	Sabine Hossenfelder, Leonard Mlodinow, Edward Witten, Karen Uhlenbeck, Robbert Dijkgraaf
261	4	"What are Scientific Breakthroughs in Biology?"	Geoffrey West, Michio Kaku, Stuart Kauffman, Antonio Damasio, V. S. Ramachandran
262	5	"What is Philosophy of Scientific Breakthroughs?"	Paul Davies, David Chalmers, David Wallace, Jim Holt, John Horgan
263	6	"How do Breakthroughs Happen in Physics?"	Robbert Dijkgraaf, Karen Uhlenbeck, Edward Witten, Gregory Chaitin
264	7	"What is Philosophy of the Breakthrough Process?"	Jim Holt, John Horgan, Michio Kaku, David Wallace, David Chalmers
265	8	"How Do Breakthroughs Happen in Biology?"	Paul Davies, V. S. Ramachandran, Antonio Damasio, Leon Glass, Daniel Chamovitz
266	9	"How to Decipher Deception in Evolution?"	Robert Trivers, Max Tegmark, Jennifer Mather, Daniel Chamovitz
267	10	"How Does Deception Affect Human Behavior?"	Joshua Greene, V. S. Ramachandran, Max Tegmark, Robert Trivers
268	11	"How Do Human Brains Experience Music?"	John Iversen, Mark Tramo, Elizabeth Margulis, Diana Deutsch
269	12	"Can Music Probe Human Mentality?"	Diana Deutsch, Suzanne Hanser, John Iversen, Elizabeth Margulis
270	13	"What Would Transhuman Brains Mean?"	Michio Kaku, Leonard Mlodinow, David Chalmers, Antonio Damasio, V. S. Ramachandran

=== Season 20 (2020) ===
No. in Series	No. in Season	Episode Title	Featured Guest / Contributor
248	1	"Art Seeking Understanding I: Foundations"	Justin Barrett, Christopher R. Brewer, David Brown, Anjan Chatterjee, Matthew Milliner, Simone Schnall, W. Christopher Stewart
249	2	"What is Philosophy of Art?"	Gordon Graham, Nicholas Wolterstorff, E. Thomas Lawson, Jean-Luc Jucker, Anjan Chatterjee, Stephan van Erp, Nathan A. Jacobs
250	3	"Can the Brain Explain Art?"	Anjan Chatterjee, Semir Zeki, V.S. Ramachandran, Raymond Tallis, Antonio Damasio
251	4	"Can Art Clarify the Mind-Body Problem?"	Rebecca Newberger Goldstein, W. Christopher Stewart, Gordon Graham, Nathan A. Jacobs, Anjan Chatterjee, Raymond Tallis
252	5	"Can Art Engage Philosophy of Religion?"	W. Christopher Stewart, Nicholas Wolterstorff, E. Thomas Lawson, Nathan A. Jacobs, Stephan van Erp, David Brown
253	6	"Can Art Reveal God's Traits?"	Nicholas Wolterstorff, Gordon Graham, Matthew Milliner, Jonathan Anderson, David Brown
254	7	"Can Art and Knowledge Enhance Each Other?"	Gordon Graham, David Brown, Jonathan Anderson, Nicholas Wolterstorff, Nathan A. Jacobs
255	8	"Did Art and Religion Co-Evolve?"	Justin Barrett, Pascal Boyer, Simone Schnall], E. Thomas Lawson
256	9	"Can Art Probe Creativity?"	Aaron Rosen, Antonius Roberts, Alfonse Borysewicz, Murray Watts, Carl Plantinga
257	10	"Art Seeking Understanding II: Meaning"	Christopher R. Brewer, Justin Barrett, Jonathan Anderson, Judith Wolfe, David Brown, W. Christopher Stewart

=== Season 19 (2019) ===
No. in Series	No. in Season	Episode Title	Featured Guest / Contributor
235	1	"What is Philosophy of Cosmology?"	Barry Loewer, Mario Livio, George Ellis, David Albert
236	2	"What is Fine Tuning in Cosmology?"	Geraint Lewis, Luke Barnes, Avi Loeb, Fred Adams, Joseph Silk
237	3	"What is Fine-Tuning in Physics?"	Bernard Carr, Luke Barnes, Avi Loeb, George Ellis
238	4	"Is the Anthropic Principle Significant?"	Bernard Carr, Pedro Ferreira, Avi Loeb, John Peacock, Luke Barnes
239	5	"What is Strong Emergence?"	George Ellis, David Albert, Barry Loewer, Tim Maudlin
240	6	"What Exists II?"	Barry Loewer, David Albert, Luke Barnes, Raymond Tallis, George Ellis
241	7	"Why Anything At All II?"	Tim Maudlin, Mario Livio, George Ellis, David Bentley Hart
242	8	"Epistemology: How Can We Know God?"	Robert Audi, Meghan Sullivan, David Bentley Hart, Menachem Fisch, Bas C. van Fraassen
243	9	"Jesus as God: A Philosophical Inquiry"	Sarah Coakley, N.T. Wright, Oliver Crisp, Eleonore Stump, C. Stephen Evans, Ian McFarland
244	10	"What is the Trinity: A Philosophical Inquiry"	Peter van Inwagen, Oliver Crisp, Michael Rea, Brian Leftow, Richard Swinburne
245	11	"What is the Incarnation: A Philosophical Inquiry"	Richard Swinburne, Ian McFarland. Timothy Pawl, N.T. Wright, John Hick
246	12	"What is the Atonement: A Philosophical Inquiry"	Eleonore Stump, Alan Torrance, Oliver Crisp, Richard Swinburne, N.T. Wright
247	13	"What is Salvation: A Philosophical Inquiry"	Oliver Crisp, Eleonore Stump, Alan Torrance, N.T. Wright

=== Season 18 (2017–2018) ===
No. in Series	No. in Season	Episode Title	Featured Guest / Contributor
222	1	"The Multiverse: What's Real?"	Max Tegmark, Laura Mersini-Houghton, Paul Davies, Andreas Albrecht, Alan H. Guth, Anthony Aguirre, Carlo Rovelli
223	2	"Critical Realism in Science and Religion"	Ernan McMullin, Bas C. van Fraassen, Paul Allen, Michael Ruse, Francisco J. Ayala, J. Matthew Ashley
224	3	"Why Consonance in Science and Religion?"	Andrew Pinsent, Francisco J. Ayala, Menachem Fisch, Tom McLeish, Michael Ruse
225	4	"Does Consciousness Require a Radical Explanation?"	Giulio Tononi, David Chalmers, Sean Carroll, Max Tegmark, David Wallace, Bernard Carr, Paul Davies
226	5	"Cosmology and Creation"	Stephen Barr, David Bentley Hart, Nancey Murphy, Tom McLeish, Andrew Pinsent
227	6	"What is Philosophy of Biology?"	Michael Ruse, Francisco J. Ayala, Celia Deane-Drummond, Louis Caruana
228	7	"Epistemology: How Do I Know?"	Robert Audi, Meghan Sullivan, Bas C. van Fraassen, Louis Caruana, David Bentley Hart
229	8	"What is Analytic Theology?"	Oliver Crisp, Sarah Coakley, Michael Rea
230	9	"Being in the World: A Tribute to Hubert Dreyfus"	Hubert L. Dreyfus
231	10	"If God, What's Evolution?"	Michael Ruse, Nancey Murphy, Celia Deane-Drummond, Francisco J. Ayala, Michael Murray
232	11	"What is Extended Mind?"	David Chalmers, Andy Clark, Raymond Tallis
233	12	"God's Sovereignty: A Tribute to Hugh McCann"	Hugh McCann
234	13	"Challenges of Analytic Theology"	Alan Torrance, N.T. Wright, Eleonore Stump, Michael Murray

=== Season 17 (2017) ===
No. in Series	No. in Season	Episode Title	Featured Guest / Contributor
209	1	"Death Disrupted?"	Julian Baggini, Max More, Sam Parnia, J. L. Schellenberg
210	2	"How Does Faith Work?"	Alister McGrath, Gregory Ganselle, J. L. Schellenberg, Edward Wierenga
211	3	"How the Subconscious Affects Us"	David Eagleman, Elizabeth Loftus, Nicholas Humphrey, Patrick McNamara, Julia Mossbridge
212	4	"Can Metaphysics Discern God I?"	Brian Leftow, John Hawthorne, Robert Spitzer, John Cottingham, Timothy O'Connor
213	5	"Can Metaphysics Discern God II?"	Richard Swinburne, Yujin Nagasawa, Michael Almeida, J. L. Schellenberg, Peter Van Inwagen
214	6	"What Is God's Own Being?"	Richard Swinburne, Robert Spitzer, Varadaraja V. Raman, Neil Gillman
215	7	"Huston Smith: Tribute to a Religious Visionary"	Huston Smith
216	8	"Observing Quanta, Observing Nature?"	Max Tegmark, Anthony Aguirre, David Wallace, Sean M. Carroll, Seth Lloyd, David Chalmers, Paul Davies, Alan Guth, Bernard Carr
217	9	"Why Philosophy of Physics & Cosmology?"	David Wallace, Sean M. Carroll, James Hartle, Carlo Rovelli
218	10	"What Exists?"	Sean M. Carroll, David Wallace, David Chalmers, Don Page
219	11	"To Seek Cosmic Origins"	Alan Guth, Andreas Albrecht, Laura Mersini-Houghton, Don Page, James Hartle
220	12	"Is the Universe Theologically Ambiguous?"	Andrew Briggs, Carlo Rovelli, Don Page, Paul Davies
221	13	"Science and the Future of Humanity"	Max Tegmark, Seth Lloyd, Anthony Aguirre, Paul Davies

=== Season 16 (2016) ===
No. in Series	No. in Season	Episode Title	Featured Guest / Contributor
196	1	"When Brains Go Bad?"	Barry Smith, Donald D. Hoffman, Susan Greenfield, Christopher Evans, Deirdre Barrett
197	2	"What Is the Doomsday Argument?"	John Leslie, J. Richard Gott III, Nick Bostrom, Martin Rees
198	3	"How Could God Make Miracles?"	Paul Fiddes, Hugh McCann, William A. Dembski, Rodney Holder, Keith Ward
199	4	"How Do Consciousness and Language Relate?"	John Searle, Rebecca Newberger Goldstein, Ned Block, Barry Smith, Colin Blakemore
200	5	"Can God and Science Mix?"	Willem B. Drees, J. Richard Gott III, David Finkelstein, Rodolfo Llinás, Don Page
201	6	"Religious Faith: Rational or Rationalization?"	John Cottingham, John Bishop, Julian Baggini, Jeff Schloss
202	7	"Can Brain Alone Explain Consciousness?"	John Searle, David Chalmers
203	8	"Can Enlarged Materialism Explain Consciousness?"	Colin McGinn, Dean Radin, Anirban Bandyopadhyay, Ken Mogi
204	9	"Does Consciousness Defeat Materialism"	Ned Block, Rodney Brooks, Marilyn Schlitz, William A. Dembski, Eric Schwitzgebel
205	10	"Fallacies in Arguing for God?"	Francis S. Collins, Francisco J. Ayala, Richard Swinburne, J. L. Schellenberg, Michael Shermer
206	11	"What Is Philosophy of Science?"	Simon Blackburn, John Hawthorne, Rebecca Newberger Goldstein, John Searle, Daniel Dennett
207	12	"Does Philosophy Help Science?"	Steven Weinberg, Paul Davies, Colin Blakemore, Scott Aaronson
208	13	"A Tribute to Marvin Minsky"	Marvin Minsky

=== Season 15 (2015) ===
No. in Series	No. in Season	Episode Title	Featured Guest / Contributor
183	1	“Does the Cosmos have a Reason?"	Michio Kaku, Alan Guth, Jill Tarter, Douglas Vakoch, Russell Stannard, Frank Wilczek
184	2	“Can the Cosmos have a Reason?"	Alexander Vilenkin, John Polkinghorne, Michael Shermer, Stephen Wolfram, Stuart Kauffman
185	3	“Implications of Cosmology"	Alan Guth, Andrei Linde, George F. Smoot III, Robert Spitzer, Jill Tarter, Douglas Vakoch
186	4	“What Is It About God?"	Peter Van Inwagen, Timothy O'Connor, Keith Ward, John Polkinghorne, Hugh McCann, John Leslie, Robin LePoidevin, Christopher Knight, Robert John Russell
187	5	“Speculating About God?"	Peter Forrest, Hubert L. Dreyfus, Neil N. Gillman, Subhash Kak, J. L. Schellenberg, Michael Tooley
188	6	“How Could God Intervene in the Universe?"	Niels Henrik Gregerson, Dirk Evers, Christopher Southgate, David Shatz, Andrei Buckareff, Edward Wierenga
189	7	“What Could ESP Mean?"	Charles T. Tart, Dean Radin, Bruce Hood, John Hick, Susan Blackmore
190	8	“How Could ESP Work?"	Brian Josephson, Lawrence M. Krauss, Michael Shermer, Charles T. Tart, Dean Radin
191	9	“How to Argue for God?"	Alister McGrath, Russell Stannard, Mahmoud M. Ayoub, Timothy O'Connor, Steven Weinberg
192	10	“Does God Know Everything?"	Edward Wierenga, Peter van Inwagen, Brian Leftow, David Hunt, Yujin Nagasawa
193	11	“What is Causation?"	Simon Blackburn, Richard Swinburne, Robin Le Poidevin, Huw Price, Walter Sinnott-Armstrong
194	12	“Does Dualism Explain Consciousness?"	Yujin Nagasawa, Richard Swinburne, Jaron Lanier, Bede Rundle, Peter Forrest
195	13	"Is Consciousness Ultimate Reality?"	Deepak Chopra, Donald Hoffman, Neil Theise, Fred Alan Wolf, Frank J. Tipler, Charles T. Tart

=== Season 14 (2015) ===
No. in Series	No. in Season	Episode Title	Featured Guest / Contributor
170	1	“Can the Mind Heal the Body?"	Deepak Chopra, Rudolph Tanzil, Elissa Epel, Gino Yu, P. Murali Doraiswamy
171	2	“Is God Responsible for Evil"	Dean Zimmerman, Holmes Rolston III, Jesse Couenhoven, John Bishop, Keith Ward
172	3	“What is Information"	Max Tegmark, Paul Davies, Seth Lloyd, Giulio Tononi, Scott Aaronson
173	4	“Can Design Point to God?"	Owen Gingerich, Ernan McMullin, Colin McGinn, Paul Davies
174	5	“What is Truth?"	Simon Blackburn, Raymond Tallis, John Hawthorne, John Hick, Michael Shermer
175	6	“Does Information Create the Cosmos?"	Seth Lloyd, Sean Carroll, Raphael Bousso, Alan Guth, Christof Koch
176	7	“Why Body in a Resurrection?"	Eleonore Stump, Dean Zimmerman, Peter Van Inwagen, Eric Steinhart
177	8	“Must Multiple Universes Exist?"	Alexander Vilenkin, Alan Guth, Raphael Bousso, Max Tegmark, Don Page, Paul Davies
178	9	“Toward a Science of Consciousness?"	Stuart Hameroff, David Chalmers, John Searle, Daniel Dennett, Deepak Chopra, Susan Blackmore, Rebecca Newberger Goldstein
179	10	“Big Questions in Free Will Part 1"	Alfred Mele, Galen Strawson, John Searle, Peter Van Inwagen, Christof Koch, Uri Maoz, Walter Sinnott-Armstrong, Thalia Wheatley, Peter Tse
180	11	“Big Questions in Free Will Part 2"	Bertram Malle, Eddy Nahmias, Roy Baumeister, Patrick Haggard, Adina Roskies, Walter Sinnott-Armstrong, Alfred Mele
181	12	“Can Free Will Survive God's Foreknowledge?"	Dean Zimmerman, David Hunt, Katherin Rogers, Jesse Couenhoven
182	13	"How Can God Not Be Free?"	Michael Almeida, Hugh McCann, Matthews Grant, David Hunt

=== Season 13 (2014) ===
No. in Series	No. in Season	Episode Title	Featured Guest / Contributor
157	1	“What is Ultimate Reality?"	Yujin Nagasawa, David Deutsch, Christof Koch, Julian Baggini, Stephen Law
158	2	“What is Consciousness?"	Simon Blackburn, Susan Greenfield, Christof Koch, Bruce Hood, Roy Baumeister
159	3	“Is This God?"	Seyyed Hossein Nasr, Brian Leftow, John Cottingham, Paul Fiddes, Alister McGrath
160	4	“Will the Universe Ever End?"	Michio Kaku, Max Tegmark, Saul Perlmutter, Alan Guth, Ken Olum
161	5	“Can the Divine Be a Person?"	Oliver D. Crisp, John Behr, J. L. Schellenberg, Deepak Chopra, Edward Wierenga
162	6	“Is Death Final?"	Greg Boyd, John Hick, Deepak Chopra, Warren S. Brown, Eric Steinhart
163	7	“What Causes Religious Belief?"	Colin Blakemore, Thalia Wheatley, Justin L. Barrett, Bruce Hood, Elizabeth Loftus, Warren S. Brown, Jared Diamond, J. L. Schellenberg, Stuart Kauffman
164	8	“What Things Are Real?"	John Hawthorne, Chris Isham, Galen Strawson, George Ellis
165	9	“Free Will for Moral Responsibility?"	Alfred Mele, Thalia Wheatley, Patrick Haggard, Roy Baumeister, Walter Sinnott-Armstrong
166	10	“What Can We Learn From Alternative Gods?"	Willem B. Drees, Yujin Nagasawa, Eric Steinhart, John Bishop, J. L. Schellenberg
167	11	“Why God, Not Nothing?"	John Leslie, John Polkinghorne, Peter van Inwagen, Robin Le Poidevin, Robert Spitzer, Menas Kafatos, Deepak Chopra
168	12	“Does God's Knowledge Ruin Free Will?"	Peter van Inwagen, Brian Leftow, Hugh McCann
169	13	"Is God Totally Free?” "What Limits God's Freedom?"	Brian Leftow, Peter van Inwagen, Dean Zimmerman

=== Season 12 (2013) ===
No. in Series	No. in Season	Episode Title	Featured Guest / Contributor
144	1	"Did the Universe have a Beginning?"	Anthony Aguirre, Andreas Albrecht, Rodney Holder, Dirk Evers, Leonard Mlodinow
145	2	"How Humans Differ from (Other) Animals"	Colin Blakemore, Barry Smith, Nicholas Humphrey, Jared Diamond, Justin L. Barrett
146	3	"What would it Feel Like to be God?"	Brian Leftow, Keith Ward, John Polkinghorne, Gregory Ganselle, Peter Forrest
147	4	"What's the New Atheism?"	Michael Shermer, Alister McGrath, Lawrence Krauss, Keith Ward, A. C. Grayling
148	5	"How does Personal Identity Persist through Time?"	Simon Blackburn, Stephen Law, Richard Swinburne, Joseph LeDoux, Bob Bilder, Roger Walsh
149	6	"Can Philosophy of Religion Find God?"	Alvin Plantinga, Eleonore Stump, Seyyed Hossein Nasr, David Shatz, Michael Tooley
150	7	"Why Do We Sleep?"	Robert Stickgold, Patrick McNamara, Deirdre Barrett, Nicholas Humphrey
151	8	"Does Fine-Tuning Demand Explanation?"	Bernard Carr, David Deutsch, Richard Swinburne, Rodney Holder, Chris Isham
152	9	"Why Obsess about Free Will?"	Patrick Haggard, Peter Tse, Walter Sinnott-Armstrong, Alison Gopnik
153	10	"Why Seek an Alternative God?"	Robin Le Poidevin, Andrei Buckareff, Peter Forrest, Sarah Coakley
154	11	"Panentheism: Is the World in God?"	Philip Clayton, Marcel Sarot, Michael Levin (biologist), Yujin Nagasawa, Sarah Coakley, Alister McGrath
155	12	"What is Nothing?"	Richard Swinburne, Simon Blackburn, Peter van Inwagen, Steven Weinberg, John Leslie, Timothy O'Connor, Robert Spitzer, Victor Stenger, John Hawthorne
156	13	"Why Anything at All?"	John Leslie, Bede Rundle, Max Tegmark, Simon Blackburn, Quentin Smith, Victor Stenger, Peter Forrest, John Leslie, Peter van Inwagen, John Polkinghorne, Richard Swinburne, Paul Davies

=== Season 11 (2013) ===
No. in Series	No. in Season	Episode Title	Featured Guest / Contributor
131	1	"Time at Sea"	Max Tegmark, Huw Price, Dean Rickies, Fotini Markopoulou, Andreas Albrecht, Garrett Lisi, Raphael Bousso, Scott Aaronson, Craig Callender, David Eagleman, David Albert, Julian Barbour, Sean Carroll
132	2	"What is Time?"	Huw Price, Julian Barbour, David Albert, Jeff Tollaksen, John Polkinghorne
133	3	"Why Believe in God?"	Sarah Coakley, A. C. Grayling, Chris Isham, Michael Shermer
134	4	"Alternative Concepts of God"	Yujin Nagasawa, Marcel Sarot, Willem B. Drees, John Bishop, Eric Steinhart, Brian Leftow
135	5	"Pantheism: Is the World God?"	Michael Levin (biologist), Peter Forrest, John Leslie, J. L. Schellenberg, Richard Swinburne
136	6	"How Do Brains Work?"	Christopher Evans, Kelsey Martin, Bob Bilder, Jared Diamond, Rodney Brooks
137	7	"What Would an Infinite Cosmos Mean?"	Martin Rees, Anthony Aguirre, Raphael Bousso, Sean Carroll, Joshua Knobe
138	8	"What is God's Eternity?"	Paul Davies, Eleonore Stump, Gregory Ganssle, William Lane Craig, Robert Spitzer, Robert John Russell
139	9	"Why is Free Will a Big Question?"	Alfred Mele, Eddy Nahmias, Tim Bayne, Bertram Malle, Joshua Knobe, Roy Baumeister
140	10	"Is Free Will an Illusion?"	Daniel Dennett, Alfred Mele, Patrick Haggard, Thalia Wheatley, Timothy O'Connor, Peter van Inwagen
141	11	"What's in a Resurrection?"	Edward Wierenga, Sarah Coakley, John Behr, Arthur Hyman, Timothy O'Connor
142	12	"Does Hell Reveal God?"	Edward Wierenga, Richard Swinburne, Paul Fiddes, John Behr, Eleonore Stump
143	13	"Confronting Consciousness"	Christof Koch, David Eagleman, Keith Ward, Warren S. Brown, Tim Bayne, Raymond Tallis

=== Season 10 (2012) ===
No. in Series	No. in Season	Episode Title	Featured Guest / Contributor
118	1	"Is the Universe Religiously Ambiguous?"	Sean Carroll, Bernard Carr, Martin Rees, Chris Isham, J. L. Schellenberg
119	2	"Is Consciousness an Illusion?"	Nicholas Humphrey, Julian Baggini, Rebecca Goldstein, Galen Strawson, A. C. Grayling, Raymond Tallis
120	3	"What is God?"	John Polkinghorne, John Behr, John Hick, J. L. Schellenberg, Timothy O'Connor
121	4	"Do General Principles Govern All Science?"	Geoffrey West, Martin Rees, Stuart Kauffman, Holmes Rolston, David Deutsch
122	5	"Are Brain and Mind the Same Thing?"	David Eagleman, Nicholas Humphrey, Richard Swinburne, Raymond Tallis, Robert Stickgold
123	6	"Current Arguments for God"	Rebecca Goldstein, Julian Barbour, John Polkinghorne, Robin Collins, A. C. Grayling, Yujin Nagasawa, Alvin Plantinga
124	7	"Why Science and Religion Think Differently"	Neils Gregerson, Holmes Rolston, Chris Southgate, Celia Deane-Drummond, A. C. Grayling
125	8	"What are Dreams About?"	Robert Stickgold, Deirdre Barrett, Chris Isham, Patrick McNamara
126	9	"Can God Face Up Evil?"	John Hick, Stephen Law, Paul Fiddes, A. C. Grayling, Robert John Russell
127	10	"How Belief Systems Work"	Julian Baggini, Stephen Law, Patrick McNamara, Gregory Ganssle, Rebecca Goldstein, Michael Shermer
128	11	"Do Religions Complement or Contradict?"	John Hick, Yujin Nagasawa, John Behr, Sarah Coakley, Mahmoud Ayoub
129	12	"Why is Free Will a Mystery?"	John Searle, Richard Swinburne, Ned Block, Walter Sinnott-Armstrong, Alfred Mele, Thalia Wheatley, Jenann Ismael, Adina Roskies, Tim Bayne, David Hunt, Alvin Plantinga
130	13	"Does Brain Science Abolish Free Will?"	Galen Strawson, Alfred Mele, Christof Koch, Uri Maoz, Richard Swinburne, Colin McGinn

=== Season 9 (2012) ===
No. in Series	No. in Season	Episode Title	Featured Guest / Contributor
105	1	"Fallacies in Proving God Exists"	Peter Atkins, Victor Stenger, Michael Tooley, Walter Sinnott-Armstrong, Denis Alexander
106	2	"Is Life and Mind Inevitable in the Universe?"	J. Richard Gott, Frank Wilczek, Robert Laughlin, Ray Kurzweil, Robert John Russell, Peter van Inwagen
107	3	"Arguing God with Analytic Philosophy"	Richard Swinburne, Philip Clayton, Bede Rundle, Richard Swinburne
108	4	"What Would Alien Intelligences Mean?"	Martin Rees, Frank Drake, Lawrence Krauss, Greg Benford, Jaron Lanier
109	5	"What God the Creator Means / How Does a Creator God Work?"	Alister McGrath, Keith Ward, William Dembski, Varadaraja V. Raman, William Lane Craig, James Tabor
110	6	"Mysteries of Cosmic Inflation"	Alexander Vilenkin, Alan Guth, Paul Steinhardt, Andrei Linde, Saul Perlmutter
111	7	"How is God All Powerful?"	Brian Leftow, Bede Rundle, John Leslie, Thomas Flint, Greg Boyd
112	8	"Does Metaphysics Reveal Reality?"	John Searle, Hubert Dreyfus, Bas van Fraassen, Steven Weinberg, Daniel Dennett, Ned Block
113	9	"Complexity from Simplicity?"	Stephen Wolfram, Seth Lloyd, Lee Smolin, Francis Collins, Frank Wilczek
114	10	"Do Humans have Free Will?"	Ned Block, David Gross, Stephen Wolfram, Nancey Murphy, JP Moreland, Jaron Lanier
115	11	"What's God About?"	Robert John Russell, Philip Clayton, Ian Barbour, John Leslie, Keith Ward
116	12	"Does Consciousness lead to God?"	Keith Ward, Susan Blackmore, Varadaraja V. Raman, Paul Davies, John Leslie
117	13	"The Mystery of Existence"	Michio Kaku, Bede Rundle, John Leslie, Hubert Dreyfus

=== Season 8 (2011) ===
No. in Series	No. in Season	Episode Title	Featured Guest / Contributor
92	1	"Is Evil Necessary in God's World?"	Walter Sinnott-Armstrong, Richard Swinburn, Robin Collins, David Shatz, Robert John Russell
93	2	"What's Beyond Physics?"	Lawrence Krauss, Michio Kaku, Rupert Sheldrake, Paul Davies, David Chalmers
94	3	"Can ESP Reveal a New Reality?"	Marilyn Schlitz, Dean Radin, Fred Alan Wolf, Michael Tooley, Alan Leshner
95	4	"Arguing God from Consciousness"	JP Moreland, Bede Rundle, Richard Swinburne, Quentin Smith, Colin McGinn
96	5	"Does the Cosmos Provide Meaning?"	Saul Perlmutter, Roger Penrose, Paul Steinhardt, Martin Rees, Frank Drake
97	6	"What Maintains Personal Identity?"	John Searle, Christof Koch, Rodolfo Llinas, Stephen Braude, Michael Tooley
98	7	"Arguing God from Being"	Peter van Inwagen, Alister McGrath, Seyyed Hossein Nasr, Michael Tooley, Alvin Plantinga
99	8	"Can Science and Theology Find Deep Reality?"	Ernan McMullin, Frank Wilczek, Francis Collins, Paul Davies, Bruce Murray
100	9	"What's Wrong with Immortal Souls?"	Keith Ward, Neil Gillman, Ananda Guruge, Dean Zimmerman, Philip Clayton
101	10	"Does God Have a Nature?"	Brian Leftow, Keith Ward, Bede Rundle, David Shatz, Alvin Plantinga
102	11	"Are There Things Not Material?"	Colin McGinn, JP Moreland, Ananda Guruge, Marvin Minsky, David Chalmers
103	12	"How Free is God?"	Richard Swinburne, Brian Leftow, Peter van Inwagen, Alvin Plantinga, William Lane Craig
104	13	"Immortality and Eternal Life"	Russell Stannard, Neil Gillman, Thomas Flint, Robin Collins, Ananda Guruge

=== Season 7 (2011) ===
No. in Series	No. in Season	Episode Title	Featured Guest / Contributor
79	1	"How To Think About God's Existence"	Philip Clayton, Victor Stenger, Robert John Russell, Michael Shermer, David Shatz, Peter van Inwagen
80	2	"Why is the Universe Breathtaking?"	Frank Wilczek, Steven Weinberg, David Finkelstein, Seth Lloyd, Freeman Dyson, Saul Perlmutter
81	3	"What is the Meaning of Consciousness?"	Ned Block, Marvin Minsky, Alva Noe, Jaron Lanier, Colin McGinn
82	4	"Arguing God from Miracles & Revelations"	William Lane Craig, Walter Sinnott-Armstrong, Richard Swinburne, Bede Rundle, Francis Collins
83	5	"Marvels of Space-Time"	Max Tegmark, J. Richard Gott, Juan Maldacena, Fotini Markopoulou, John Leslie
84	6	"What Makes Brains Conscious?"	Arnold Scheibel, John Mazziotta, Christof Koch, Joseph LeDoux, Stephen Chorover
85	7	"Is God Perfect?"	Brian Leftow, Richard Swinburne, JP Moreland, Walter Sinnott-Armstrong, Keith Ward, Philip Clayton
86	8	"What are the Scope and Limits of Science?"	Frank Wilczek, J. Richard Gott, Stephen Wolfram, Bas van Fraassen, Owen Gingerich
87	9	"Is Human Consciousness Special?"	Marvin Minsky, Roger Walsh, Marilyn Schlitz, Colin McGinn, J. Wentzel van Huyssteen
88	10	"If God Knows the Future, What is Free Will?"	Alvin Plantinga, Thomas Flint, Peter van Inwagen, Dean Zimmerman
89	11	"Can Science Talk God?"	David Gross, William Dembski, Victor Stenger, Gregory Chaitin, George Smoot
90	12	"Do Persons Survive Death?"	Charles Tart, Richard Swinburne, Robert Park, James Tabor, Keith Ward
91	13	"Is Theism Coherent?"	Richard Swinburne, Walter Sinnott-Armstrong, Quentin Smith

=== Season 6 (2010) ===
No. in Series	No. in Season	Episode Title	Featured Guest / Contributor
66	1	"Arguing God from Natural Theology?"	John Polkinghorne, Victor Stenger, William Dembski, J. Wentzel van Huyssteen, Owen Gingerich
67	2	"What is the Large-Scale Structure of the Universe?"	J. Richard Gott, Abraham Loeb, George Smoot, Saul Perlmutter
68	3	"Does ESP Reveal Spirit Existence?"	Stephen Braude, Marilyn Schlitz, Dean Radin, Robert Park, Charles Tart
69	4	"Is God All Knowing?"	William Lane Craig, John Leslie, Thomas Flint, Robert John Russell
70	5	"Why is the Quantum So Strange?"	Wojciech Zurek, Nima Arkani-Hamed, Lee Smolin, Seth Lloyd
71	6	"Can Metaphysics Discover Surprises?"	Colin McGinn, Peter van Inwagen, Philip Clayton, George Lakoff, Dean Zimmerman
72	7	"Is God Necessary?"	Alvin Plantinga, Peter van Inwagen, Richard Swinburne, Bede Rundle, David Shatz
73	8	"Would Multiple Universes Undermine God?"	Victor Stenger, Richard Swinburne, Robin Collins, Russell Stannard
74	9	"Do Human Brains Have Free Will?"	John Searle, Rodolfo Llinas, Christof Koch, Eran Zaidel, Roger Walsh, Michael Merzenich, Henry Stapp, Colin McGinn
75	10	"Arguing for Agnosticism?"	Mark Vernon, Nick Bostrom, Denis Alexander, Leonard Susskind, John Searle
76	11	"Are Science & Religion at War?"	Philip Clayton, William Dembski, Bas van Fraassen, Robert John Russell
77	12	"Why Explore Consciousness and Cosmos?"	David Chalmers, Alexander Vilenkin, David Brin, Colin McGinn, Paul Davies
78	13	"A New Heaven & A New Earth?"	Nancey Murphy, Arthur Hyman, Robin Collins, John Polkinghorne, Robert John Russell

=== Season 5 (2010) ===
No. in Series	No. in Season	Episode Title	Featured Guest / Contributor
53	1	"How Do Human Brains Think and Feel?"	Rodolfo Llinas, John Mazziotta, Joseph LeDoux, Michael Merzenich, Eran Zaidel
54	2	"Does a Fine-Tuned Universe Lead to God?"	Robin Collins, Victor Stenger, Ernan McMullin, Michio Kaku
55	3	"Wondering About God"	Keith Ward, Mahmoud Ayoub, Neil Gillman, Ananda Guruge, John Leslie, William Grassie, J. Wentzel van Huyssteen, Paul Davies, Alvin Plantinga
56	4	"What is the Far Far Future of the Universe?"	Martin Rees, Wendy Freedman, Abraham Loeb, Alexander Vilenkin, Robert John Russell
57	5	"Solutions to the Mind-Body Problem?"	Ned Block, Dean Zimmerman, Colin McGinn, Charles Tart, Henry Stapp
58	6	"How is God the Creator?"	William Lane Craig, John Polkinghorne, Brian Leftow
59	7	"What would Multiple Universes Mean?"	Max Tegmark, Anthony Aguirre, Alan Guth, Andrei Linde, Renata Kallosh, Paul Davies
60	8	"What Things are Conscious?"	John Searle, Ray Kurzweil, JP Moreland, Marilyn Schlitz, Rupert Sheldrake
61	9	"Can Religion be Explained Without God?"	Daniel Dennett, J. Wentzel van Huyssteen, Susan Blackmore, Denis Alexander, Michael Shermer
62	10	"What's Real About Time?"	Greg Benford, Kip Thorne, Nima Arkani-Hamed, Lee Smolin
63	11	"How do Persons Maintain Their Identity?"	Colin McGinn, Susan Blackmore, Ray Kurzweil, John Polkinghorne, Peter van Inwagen
64	12	"Is God a "Person"?"	Thomas Flint, JP Moreland, Neil Gillman, Varadaraja V. Raman, Philip Clayton
65	13	"Asking Ultimate Questions"	Lawrence Krauss, John Leslie, Max Tegmark, Paul Davies

=== Season 4 (2009) ===
No. in Series	No. in Season	Episode Title	Featured Guest / Contributor
40	1	"Why is Consciousness Baffling?"	Charles Tart, Roger Walsh, Ray Kurzweil, Hubert Dreyfus, Alva Noe, Henry Stapp, George Lakoff
41	2	"What is God Like?"	Alvin Plantinga, Peter van Inwagen, Neil Gillman, Richard Swinburne, Huston Smith
42	3	"What does an Expanding Universe Mean?"	Alan Guth, Paul Steinhardt, Saul Perlmutter, George F. R. Ellis, Andrei Linde
43	4	"Is the Person All Material?"	Daniel Dennett, Alvin Plantinga, Peter van Inwagen, John Searle, David Chalmers
44	5	"Arguments Against God?"	Susan Blackmore, Peter Atkins, Alvin Plantinga, Steven Weinberg, Richard Swinburne, Michael Shermer
45	6	"Are there Extra Dimensions?"	Lawrence Krauss, Michio Kaku, David Gross, Nima Arkani-Hamed, Juan Maldacena, Roger Penrose
46	7	"Would Intelligent Aliens Undermine God?"	Steven J. Dick, Russell Stannard, Paul Davies, Robin Collins, Jill Tarter, Doug Vakoch
47	8	"Did God Create Evil?"	Nancey Murphy, Greg Boyd, Mahmoud Ayoub, Varadaraja V. Raman, Keith Ward
48	9	"Is Mathematics Invented or Discovered?"	Roger Penrose, Mark Balaguer, Gregory Chaitin, Stephen Wolfram, Frank Wilczek
49	10	"Do Angels and Demons Exist?"	JP Moreland, Thomas Flint, Dean Radin, Walter Sinnott-Armstrong, James Tabor
50	11	"Why the Laws of Nature?"	Martin Rees, Steven Weinberg, Freeman Dyson, Peter Atkins, Lee Smolin, Bas van Fraassen
51	12	"What is God's Judgment?"	John Polkinghorne, Seyyed Hossein Nasr, Varadaraja V. Raman, Ven. Yifa, Robert John Russell
52	13	"Why the Cosmos?"	Owen Gingerich, Ray Kurzweil, Max Tegmark, John Polkinghorne, Steven J. Dick, Paul Davies

=== Season 3 (2009) ===
No. in Series	No. in Season	Episode Title	Featured Guest / Contributor
27	1	"How Could God Know the Future?"	Russell Stannard, John Polkinghorne, Ernan McMullin, Greg Boyd, William Lane Craig
28	2	"Is the Universe Fine-Tuned for Life and Mind?"	Martin Rees, Leonard Susskind, Alexander Vilenkin, Russell Stannard, Roger Penrose
29	3	"How Does Beauty Color the Cosmos?"	Peter Atkins, Roger Penrose, Stephon Alexander, Fotini Markopoulou, Frank Wilczek, Freeman Dyson
30	4	"What Things Really Exist?"	Roger Penrose, Peter van Inwagen, John Searle, William Lane Craig, John Leslie
31	5	"Where are They, All Those Aliens?"	Jill Tarter, Doug Vakoch, Frank Drake, Ray Kurzweil, Francisco Ayala, Steven J. Dick, David Brin
32	6	"Why is There “Something” Rather than “Nothing”?"	John Leslie, Peter van Inwagen, Bede Rundle, Quentin Smith, Richard Swinburne, Steven Weinberg
33	7	"Can Many Religions All Be True?"	Alvin Plantinga, Richard Swinburne, Arthur Hyman, Seyyed Hossein Nasr, Ananda Guruge, Varadaraja V. Raman
34	8	"Is Consciousness Fundamental?"	David Chalmers, John Searle, Marilyn Schlitz, Varadaraja V. Raman, Paul Davies, Andrei Linde
35	9	"Is There A Final Theory of Everything?"	Steven Weinberg, David Gross, Robert Laughlin, Stephen Wolfram, Frank Wilczek
36	10	"How can Emergence Explain Reality?"	Robert Laughlin, Peter Atkins, Francisco Ayala, Stephen Wolfram, Philip Clayton
37	11	"Is This the End Time?"	James Tabor, Robert Saucy, Nancey Murphy, Arthur Hyman, Greg Boyd
38	12	"Eternal Life is Like What?"	Richard Swinburne, JP Moreland, Seyyed Hossein Nasr, Varadaraja V. Raman, Huston Smith
39	13	"Do Science & Religion Conflict?"	Daniel Dennett, Owen Gingerich, Marvin Minsky, Francisco Ayala, J. Wentzel van Huyssteen, Paul Davies

=== Season 2 (2008) ===
No. in Series	No. in Season	Episode Title	Featured Guest / Contributor
14	1	"Is There Life After Death?"	Stephen Braude, Michael Tooley, JP Moreland, Nancey Murphy, David Shatz, Master Hsing Yun
15	2	"Arguing God from Morality"	JP Moreland, Richard Swinburne, Francis Collins, Michael Tooley, Michael Shermer
16	3	"How Many Universes Exist?"	Andrei Linde, Alan Guth, Martin Rees, Leonard Susskind, Max Tegmark, Steven Weinberg
17	4	"Can Brain Explain Mind?"	Christof Koch, Rodolfo Llinas, Ray Kurzweil, John Searle, David Chalmers
18	5	"What is the Mind-Body Problem?"	John Searle, Ned Block, JP Moreland, Marvin Minsky, Colin McGinn
19	6	"Is Time Travel Possible?"	Michio Kaku, J. Richard Gott, Kip Thorne, Fred Alan Wolf, Seth Lloyd
20	7	"Did God Create Time?"	Brian Leftow, John Polkinghorne, Ernan McMullin, William Lane Craig, Varadaraja V. Raman, Robert John Russell
21	8	"Does Evil Disprove God?"	Peter van Inwagen, Quentin Smith, Alvin Plantinga, Michael Tooley, Richard Swinburne
22	9	"Why are Black Holes Astonishing?"	Kip Thorne, Leonard Susskind, Juan Maldacena, Nima Arkani-Hamed, Lee Smolin
23	10	"What is Free Will?"	Peter van Inwagen, John Searle, Daniel Dennett, Alan Leshner, Susan Blackmore, Christof Koch
24	11	"Arguments for Atheism"	Michael Tooley, Daniel Dennett, Richard Swinburne, Nancey Murphy, Walter Sinnott-Armstrong
25	12	"How Could God Interact with the World?"	Robert John Russell, John Polkinghorne, Paul Davies, Alvin Plantinga, Ernan McMullin
26	13	"What's the Far Future of Intelligence in the Universe?"	Freeman Dyson, Lawrence Krauss, Ray Kurzweil, Frank Tipler, Robin Collins, Paul Davies

=== Season 1 (2008) ===
No. in Series	No. in Season	Episode Title	Featured Guest / Contributor
1	1	"Does God Make Sense?"	Richard Swinburne, Alvin Plantinga, Daniel Dennett, Seyyed Hossein Nasr, Varadaraja V. Raman, Huston Smith, Michael Shermer
2	2	"How Vast is the Cosmos?"	Martin Rees, Martin Rees, Max Tegmark, Alan Guth, Andrei Linde, Paul Davies
3	3	"Why is Consciousness So Mysterious?"	Ven. Yifa, Susan Blackmore, Keith Ward, Daniel Dennett, David Chalmers, John Searle, Colin McGinn
4	4	"Did Our Universe Have a Beginning?"	Wendy Freedman, Alan Guth, George Smoot, Alexander Vilenkin, Martin Rees
5	5	"How are Brains Structured?"	Arnold Scheibel, Carmine Clemente, John Schlag, Christof Koch, Michael Merzenich, Rodolfo Llinas
6	6	"Arguing God's Existence"	Keith Ward, Owen Gingerich, William Lane Craig, Walter Sinnott-Armstrong, Alvin Plantinga, Steven Weinberg
7	7	"Why a Fine-Tuned Universe?"	John A. Leslie, Steven Weinberg, David Gross, John Polkinghorne, Robin Collins, Paul Davies
8	8	"Do Persons have Souls?"	JP Moreland, Nancey Murphy, Richard Swinburne, Daniel Dennett, Peter van Inwagen, Huston Smith
9	9	"Arguing God from Design"	Richard Swinburne, Bede Rundle, Steven Weinberg, William Dembski, Francisco Ayala, Michael Shermer, Freeman Dyson
10	10	"Could Our Universe Be a Fake?"	David Brin, Nick Bostrom, Ray Kurzweil, Marvin Minsky, Martin Rees
11	11	"Does ESP Reveal the Nonphysical?"	Marilyn Schlitz, Charles Tart, Susan Blackmore, Rupert Sheldrake, Dean Radin, Michael Shermer
12	12	"Arguing God from First Cause"	William Lane Craig, Quentin Smith, Alister McGrath, David Shatz, Charles Harper Jr., Peter van Inwagen
13	13	"Can Science Deal With God?"	Lawrence Krauss, Francis Collins, Robert John Russell, Ian Barbour, Freeman Dyson, Michio Kaku

=== Roundtables (2000–2003) ===
==== Season 3 (2003) ====
No. in Series	No. in Season	Episode Title	Featured Guest / Contributor
1	1	"Is Science Fiction Science?"	Michael Crichton, David Brin, Octavia Butler
2	2	"Can We Believe in Both Science and Religion?"	Nancey Murphy, Muzaffar Iqbal, Michael Shermer
3	3	"How Does the Autistic Brain Work?"	Eric Courchesne, Eric Shuman, Terry Sejnowski, Tito Mukhopadhyay, Soma Mukhopadhyay, Portia Iversen
4	4	"How Weird is the Cosmos?"	David Goodstein, Alan Guth, Neil deGrasse Tyson, Roger Blandford
5	5	"Microbes - Friend or Foe"	Agnes Day, Paul Ewald, Alice Huang, Lucy Shapiro
6	6	"How Does Order Arise in the Universe?"	Murray Gell-Mann, David Baltimore
7	7	"Why is Music So Significant?"	Jeanne Bamberger, Robert Freeman, Mark Jude Tramo
8	8	"Will Computers Take a Quantum Leap?"	David DiVincenzo, Seth Lloyd, Birgitta Whaley
9	9	"Does Psychiatry Have a Split Personality?"	Nancy Andreasen, Robert Epstein, Peter Loewenberg
10	10	"How Does Basic Science Defend America?"	Steven Koonin, Llewellyn “Doc” Dougherty, David Herrelko
11	11	"Who Gets to Validate Alternative Medicine?"	Hyla Cass, William Jarvis, Daniel Labriola, Wallace Sampson
12	12	"Is Consciousness Definable?"	Joseph Bogen, Christof Koch, Leslie Brothers, Stuart Hameroff
13	13	"Is the Universe Full of Life?"	Shri Kulkarni, Bruce Murray, Neil deGrasse Tyson
14	14	"Can Religion Withstand Technology?"	Donald Miller, Muzaffar Iqbal, Michael Shermer
15	15	"Testing New Drugs: Are People Guinea Pigs?"	Alexander Capron, Andrea Kovacs, Robert Temple

==== Season 2 (2000) ====
No. in Series	No. in Season	Episode Title	Featured Guest / Contributor
15	1	"Can We Imagine the Far Future—Year 3000?"	Edward de Bono, Bart Kosko, Graham T. T. Molitor, Bruce Murray
16	2	"How Do Breakthroughs Change Science?"	Neil deGrasse Tyson, Timothy Ferris, Francisco Ayala, Patricia Smith Churchland, Rochel Gelman
17	3	"How Does Creativity Work at Work?"	Stephen J. Cannell, Ray Kurzweil, Mihaly Csikszentmihalyi, Robert Freeman, John Kao
18	4	"Do Brains Make Minds?"	David Chalmers, John Searle, Marilyn Schlitz, Fred Alan Wolf, Barry Beyerstein
19	5	"Will Gene Therapy Change the Human Race?"	Francisco Ayala, French Anderson, Sherwin Nuland, Gregory Stock, Allan Tobin
20	6	"Why are Music and Art So Exhilarating?"	Ray Kurzweil, Rhoda Janzen, Todd Boyd, Todd Siler, Robert Freeman
21	7	"Why is Quantum Physics So Beautiful?"	Leon Lederman, Andrei Linde, Steve Koonin, Gregory Benford, Charles Buchanan
22	8	"How Did We Think in the Last Millennium?"	Edward de Bono, Graham T. T. Molitor, Bruce Murray, Edward Feigenbaum, Sherwin Nuland
23	9	"Who Needs Sex Therapy?"	Cliff Penner, Joyce Penner, Sherwin Nuland, Paul Abramson, Vern Bullough
24	10	"How Does Technology Transform Society?"	Francis Fukuyama, Marvin Minsky, George Kozmetsky, Gregory Benford, Gregory Stock
25	11	"Can You Learn to Be Creative?"	Mihaly Csikszentmihalyi, John Kao, Todd Siler, Rhoda Janzen
26	12	"What is Parapsychology?"	James Trefil, Dean Radin, Barry Beyerstein, Marilyn Schlitz, Charles Tart
27	13	"Will This Universe Ever End?"	Leon Lederman, Wendy Freedman, Andrei Linde, Nancey Murphy, Frank Tipler
28	14	"Will Intelligence Fill This Universe?"	Leon Lederman, Francisco Ayala, Bruce Murray, Frank Tipler, Gregory Benford

==== Season 1 (2000) ====
No. in Series	No. in Season	Episode Title	Featured Guest / Contributor
1	1	"What Are the Grand Questions of Science?"	Neil deGrasse Tyson, Timothy Ferris, Francisco Ayala, Patricia Smith Churchland, Steven Koonin
2	2	"Will the Internet Change Humanity?"	Francis Fukuyama, George Geis, Bart Kosko, Bruce Murray
3	3	"What's Creativity and Who's Creative?"	Stephen J. Cannell, Ray Kurzweil, Mihaly Csikszentmihalyi, Robert Freeman, John Kao
4	4	"New Communities for the New Millennium"	Neil deGrasse Tyson, Bruce Chapman, Barbara Marx Hubbard, Saru Jayaraman, John McWhorter
5	5	"How Did This Universe Begin?"	Leon Lederman, Andrei Linde, Wendy Freedman, Nancey Murphy, Frank Tipler
6	6	"Can We See the Near Future--Year 2025?"	Edward de Bono, Bart Kosko, Edward Feigenbaum, Graham T. T. Molitor, Bruce Murray
7	7	"What is Consciousness?"	James Trefil, David Chalmers, John Searle, Marilyn Schlitz, Fred Alan Wolf
8	8	"Can You Really Extend Your Life?"	French Anderson, Sherwin Nuland, Arthur De Vany, Gregory Stock, Roy Walford
9	9	"Can ESP Affect Your Life?"	James Trefil, Dean Radin, Barry Beyerstein, Marilyn Schlitz, Charles Tart
10	10	"Whatever Happened to Ethics and Civility?"	Bruce Chapman, Saru Jayaraman, John McWhorter, Barbara Marx Hubbard, Richard Mouw
11	11	"How Does Technology Transform Thinking?"	Francis Fukuyama, Marvin Minsky, Bart Kosko, Bruce Murray, George Kozmetsky
12	12	"Strange Physics of the Mind?"	Gregory Benford, James Trefil, David Chalmers, John Searle, Fred Alan Wolf
13	13	"Can Science Seek the Soul?"	Warren S. Brown, Dean Radin, Charles Tart, John Searle, Fred Alan Wolf
14	14	"Does Sex Have a Future?"	Cliff Penner, Joyce Penner, Paul Abramson, Vern Bullough, Gregory Stock
