= Roskies =

Roskies is a surname. Notable people with the surname include:

- Adina L. Roskies, American philosopher
- David G. Roskies (born 1948), Canadian literary scholar
