= Paul Abramson =

Paul Abramson may refer to:

- Paul Abramson (politician) (1889–1976), Estonian politician
- Paul R. Abramson (political scientist) (1937–2018), American political scientist
- Paul R. Abramson (psychologist) (born 1949), American psychologist
