= Philip Clayton =

Philip Clayton may refer to:

- Tubby Clayton (1885–1972), English Anglican clergyman and the founder of Toc H
- Philip Clayton (philosopher) (born 1956), American Christian philosopher
