= Poidevin =

Poidevin is a surname. Notable people with the surname include:

- Eugène Modeste Edmond Poidevin (1806-1870), French painter
- Les Poidevin (1876–1931), Australian tennis player
- Robin Le Poidevin (born 1962), British metaphysicist
- Sara Poidevin (born 1996), Canadian racing cyclist
- Simon Poidevin (born 1958), Australian rugby union player
