= Malcolm Jeeves =

Scottish psychologist

Malcolm Alexander Jeeves CBE FRSE FMedSci (born 16 November 1926) is emeritus Professor of Psychology at the University of St Andrews, and was formerly President of the Royal Society of Edinburgh. He established the Department of Psychology at St Andrews and his research interests centre on cognitive psychology and neuropsychology.

== Career ==
- Educated at Stamford School, Lincolnshire, and St John's College, Cambridge where he won an exhibition in Natural Sciences in 1945.
- 1945-1948 he served as an infantry officer in Germany with the Royal Lincolnshire Regiment and the Sherwood Foresters.
- Undergraduate study and postgraduate research at Cambridge where he was awarded a PhD,
- 1955 Advanced Fellowship at Harvard,
- 1956 appointed lecturer in psychology at the University of Leeds
- 1959 Foundation Professor of Psychology at the University of Adelaide.
- 1969 Foundation Professor of Psychology at St Andrews University
- 1980-1984 Vice-Principal
- 1992 Commander of the Order of the British Empire for his services to science and to psychology in Britain.
- 1996-1999 President of the Royal Society of Edinburgh
- 1998 Elected a Founder Fellow of the Academy of Medical Sciences

He has received honorary degrees from Edinburgh University, Stirling University, and St Andrews University.

Amongst his medals and prizes are the Kenneth Craik Prize in Experimental Psychology at Cambridge, the Abbie Medal in Anatomy at the University of Adelaide in Australia, and the Cairns Medal of the Society of Neurologists and Neurosurgeons of South Australia. He is a Fellow of the Academy of Medical Sciences of Britain, of the British Psychological Society, and of the Royal Society of Edinburgh. His main scientific research interests are in neuropsychology; he was editor-in-chief of the international scientific journal Neuropsychologia in the 1990s.

== Publications ==
=== Books ===
==== Psychology ====
- Thinking in Structures (with Z. P. Dienes) - translated into French, German, Italian, Hungarian, Spanish, Japanese
- Effects of Structural Relations upon Transfer (with Z. P. Dienes) - translated into French, German, Italian
- Experimental Psychology: an Introduction for Biologists - translated into French
- Analysis of Structural Learning (with G. B. Greer)
- Callosal Agenesis (with M. Lassonde)

==== Science and Christian belief ====
- The Scientific Enterprise and Christian Faith (1968)
- Psychology and Christianity: The View Both Ways (1976)
- Free to be Different (with R. J. Berry and D. Atkinson) (1984)
- Psychology through the Eyes of Faith (with D. Myers) (1987)
- Human Nature at the Millennium (1997)
- Science, Life and Christian Belief (with R. J. Berry) (1998)
- Psychology through the Eyes of Faith: revised and updated (with D. Myers) (2002)
- From Cells to Souls-and Beyond (2003)
- Neuroscience, Psychology, and Religion: Illusions, Delusions, and Realities about Human Nature (with Warren S. Brown) (2009)
- Minds, Brains, Souls and Gods: A Conversation on Faith, Psychology and Neuroscience (2013), IVP Academic, ISBN 978-0-8308-3998-8
- Psychological Science and Christian Faith: Insights and Enrichments from Constructive Dialogue (with Thomas Ludwig) (2019)
