= Robin Collins =

American philosopher

Robin Alan Collins

Education
- Education: Washington State University (BA, BS); University of Texas at Austin; University of Notre Dame (PhD)

Philosophical work
- School: Analytic Philosophy
- Main interests: Philosophy of Science; Philosophy of Religion; Natural Theology; Philosophical Theology; Christian Apologetics
- Website: https://www.messiah.edu/homepage/1662/robin_collins

Robin Alan Collins is an American philosopher. He serves as the Distinguished Professor of Philosophy and as the chair of the Department of Philosophy at Messiah University in Mechanicsburg, Pennsylvania. His main interests include philosophical issues related to the relationship between religion and science and philosophical theology.

== Education ==
Collins obtained two undergraduate degrees from Washington State University in 1984 with a triple major in mathematics, physics, and philosophy, graduating summa cum laude. Collins spent two years in a Ph.D. program in physics at the University of Texas at Austin before transferring to the University of Notre Dame, where he received a Ph.D. in philosophy in 1993. His dissertation was titled "Epistemological Issues in the Scientific Realism/Antirealism Debate: An Analysis and a Proposal."

He served as a post-doctoral fellow at Northwestern University's Program in History and Philosophy of Science before joining Messiah College.

== Career ==
Collins has taught philosophy at Messiah University since 1994 and is a leading advocate of the Fine-Tuning Argument. Collins was interviewed as a major contributor to The Case for a Creator by Lee Strobel. Using his background in both philosophy and physics, he has developed a Fine-Tuning for Discoverability Argument, in which he argues that many scientific constants are fine-tuned to optimize our ability to discover knowledge about the universe.
