= Patrick Haggard =

Patrick Neville Haggard, FBA, is a cognitive neuroscientist and academic. He is Professor of Cognitive Neuroscience at University College London.

== Biography ==
Haggard completed his undergraduate degree at Trinity Hall, Cambridge, and then spent a year (1987–88) as a Harkness Fellow at Yale University. He returned to Trinity Hall to complete his PhD, which was awarded in 1991. He then spent three years as a Wellcome Trust prize fellow at the University of Oxford and as a junior research fellow at Christ Church, Oxford. In 1995, he joined UCL as a lecturer, and was promoted to senior lecturer in 1998 and to a readership in 2002.

Haggard has published over 500 papers as of 2019. His research has focused on "the cognitive neuroscience of voluntary action" and "the representation of one's own body" by the brain.

In 2014, Haggard was elected a Fellow of the British Academy, the United Kingdom's national academy for the humanities and social sciences.

In 2016, Haggard was awarded the Jean Nicod Prize.
