= L. Gordon Graham =

British philosopher (born 1949)

Lawrence Gordon Graham
- Born: 1949 (age 76–77); Ireland

Education
- Education: University of Durham (PhD)
- Thesis: On the nature of ideological argument (1975)
- Doctoral advisor: David John Manning

Philosophical work
- Era: 21st-century philosophy
- Region: Western philosophy
- Main interests: Moral Philosophy
- Website: https://www.gordon-graham.net

Gordon Graham (born 1949) is chair of the Edinburgh Sacred Arts Foundation, director of the Edinburgh Festival of the Sacred Arts in the Fringe, emeritus professor of philosophy and the arts at Princeton Theological Seminary in the US, and a Fellow of the Royal Society of Edinburgh, Scotland's premier academy of science and letters.

== Education and career ==
Born in Ireland and educated in Ireland, Scotland and England, he taught philosophy in Scotland at the University of St Andrews (from 1975 to 1995). He was Regius Professor of Moral Philosophy at the University of Aberdeen (from 1996 to 2006) before taking up his post as Henry Luce III Professor of Philosophy and the Arts at Princeton Theological Seminary (2006–18). He has published extensively on a wide range of philosophical topics relating to art, education, ethics, politics, religion, and technology. He has a special interest in the Scottish philosophical tradition, and was founding editor of the Journal of Scottish Philosophy. From 2007 to 2018, he was director of the Center for the Study of Scottish Philosophy at Princeton, and on his retirement was honoured with the 'Life Time Achievement Award' of the Eighteenth Century Scottish Studies Society. From 2008 to 2015 he was director of The Abraham Kuyper Center for Public Theology.

An Anglican priest ordained in the Scottish Episcopal Church, he was licensed in the Episcopal Diocese of New Jersey from 2007 to 2018, and now holds a warrant in the Diocese of Edinburgh. In 1990 he was Sheffer Visiting Professor of Religion at The Colorado College, and in 2004 Stanton Lecturer in Philosophy and Religion at the University of Cambridge.

Gordon Graham was director of the St Andrews University Music Centre from 1991 to 1995, taught as an adjunct professor of Sacred Music at the Westminster Choir College in 2010–12, and since 2018 has directed the Edinburgh Festival of the Sacred Arts in the Fringe. He has written several texts for hymns and anthems. Two, set to music by the composer Paul Mealor – Lux benigna' and 'Anthem to St David' – have been published by Novello.

In 2019, the Institute for the Study of Scottish Philosophy announced the Gordon Graham Prize in Scottish Philosophy. The winner of the competition was Enrico Galvagni, whose paper was published in the Journal of Scottish Philosophy.

== Books ==
David Hume and the Aberdeen Philosophers (Edinburgh University Press, 2025)

The Hope of the Poor: philosophy, religion and economic development (Exeter: Imprint Academic, 2023)

Scottish Philosophy After the Enlightenment (Edinburgh University Press, 2022)

Philosophy, Art and Religion: understanding faith and creativity (Cambridge University Press, 2017)

Wittgenstein and Natural Religion (Oxford University Press, 2014)

The Re-enchantment of the World: art versus religion (Oxford University Press, 2007, pb 2010)

Theories of Ethics (New York: Routledge 2010)

Ethics and International Relations 2nd revised edition, (Malden MA and Oxford: Blackwell 2008)

Universities: the recovery of an idea 2nd revised edition (Exeter: Imprint Academic, 2008).

The Case Against the Democratic State Exeter: (Imprint Academic, 2002)

Genes: a philosophical inquiry, (London: Routledge 2002)Translations: Portuguese (2005)

Philosophy of the Arts 3rd revised edition, (London and New York: Routledge, 2004) 1st edition 1997, 2nd edition 2001 Translations: Portuguese (2001); Hungarian (2000); Serbian (2000) Russian (2001); Persian (2002)

The Internet: a philosophical inquiry, (London: Routledge 1999, reprinted 2000, 2001, 2002) Translations: Dutch (2001); Spanish (2001); Greek (2002); Korean (2003)

Evil and Christian Ethics (Cambridge University Press, 2001)

The Shape of the Past: a philosophical approach to history, (Oxford University Press, 1997)

Living the Good Life: an introduction to moral philosophy, (New York: Paragon Press 1990, reprinted 1991, 1994)

The Idea of Christian Charity: a critique of some contemporary conceptions (Indiana, Notre Dame University Press)

Contemporary Social Philosophy, (Oxford: Blackwell 1988, reprinted 1990, 1991, 1994) Translations: Italian (1991); Chinese (1995)

Politics in its Place: a study of six ideologies, (Oxford: Clarendon Press, 1986)

Historical Explanation Reconsidered, Scots Philosophical Monographs No.4 (Aberdeen: University Press, 1983)
