= Ernan McMullin =

Irish philosopher and physicist (1924–2011)

Ernan McMullin (October 13, 1924 – February 8, 2011) was an Irish philosopher who last served as the O’Hara Professor of Philosophy Emeritus at the University of Notre Dame. He was an internationally respected philosopher of science who has written and lectured extensively on subjects ranging from the relationship between cosmology and theology, to the role of values in understanding science, to the impact of Darwinism on Western religious thought. He is the only person to ever hold the presidency of four of the major US philosophical associations. He was an expert on the life of Galileo.

== Life ==
McMullin was born on October 13, 1924, in Ballybofey and died on February 8, 2011, in Letterkenny in his native County Donegal, Ireland.

== Career ==
- Educated at Maynooth College in Ireland, where he received a BSc in physics in 1945 and a bachelor of divinity degree in theology.
- 1949 ordained a Catholic priest.
- Studied theoretical physics on a fellowship at the Dublin Institute for Advanced Studies
- 1954 earned a Ph.D. in philosophy at the University of Leuven.
- 1954 Joined Notre Dame faculty as an assistant professor of philosophy,
- 1967 a full professor
- 1984 named to the John Cardinal O’Hara Chair.
- 1965–1972 chaired the Notre Dame department of philosophy.

He was a visiting professor at the University of Minnesota, the University of Cape Town, the University of California at Los Angeles, Princeton University, and Yale University. A former Phi Beta Kappa National Lecturer, he delivered the Cardinal Mercier Lecturer at the (Flemish) University of Leuven in 1995 and the Reynolds Lecture at Baylor University in 2005. He also served on numerous scholarly committees and congresses worldwide and is the only person ever to have been elected president of all the following professional organizations: the American Philosophical Association (1984), the Philosophy of Science Association, the Metaphysical Society of America (1974) and the American Catholic Philosophical Association. He served as the chair of the History and Philosophy of Science Section of the AAAS, as a member of the executive committees of the History of Science Society, the Council for Philosophical Studies, and the Society of Christian Philosophers, and as a member of numerous scholarly and scientific committees, congresses, and panels. A fellow of the American Academy of Arts and Sciences, the International Academy of the History of Science, and the AAAS, he was an honorary fellow of St. Edmund's College, Cambridge, and was awarded honorary degrees by the National University of Ireland at Maynooth, Loyola University (Chicago), Stonehill College, and University of Notre Dame.

Among other honors, he won the Aquinas Medal of the American Catholic Philosophical Association, the Centennial Medal of John Carroll University, the Founder’s Medal of the Metaphysical Society of America, and two Notre Dame faculty awards.

McMullin was influential on the thought of the eminent philosopher of biology Michael Ruse.

Father McMullin wrote and lectured widely on subjects ranging from the relationship between cosmology and theology, to the role of values in understanding science, to the impact of Darwinism on Western religious thought. He also was an unrivalled expert on the life of Galileo.

== Publications ==
McMullin served on the editorial boards of a dozen academic journals and encyclopedia. At the time of his death he was a member of the editorial boards of Perspectives on Science, International Studies in the Philosophy of Science, Studies in the History and Philosophy of Science, and International Philosophical Studies. The author of some 200 articles in scholarly and popular journals, Father McMullin also published 14 books including:

- Newton on Matter and Activity (1978)
- The Inference That Makes Science (1992).
- The Church and Galileo, a collection of essays he edited for the University of Notre Dame Press, was published in 2005 to widespread acclaim.

The author of numerous scholarly articles and the editor of a series of monographs on logic published in the mid-1960s by Prentice Hall, he also edited ten other books. Among his edited volumes:

- The Concept of Matter in Greek and Medieval Philosophy (Notre Dame, IN: Univ. of Notre Dame Press, 1965).
- The Concept of Matter in Modern Philosophy (1978 Rev. ed).
- Evolution and Creation (1985)

Just before his death, he was working on a study on rationality, realism, and the growth of knowledge.

- Harvard University philosophy professor Peter Godfrey-Smith discusses McMullin's views on Scientific realism in the book Theory and reality (University of Chicago Press, 2003, p. 178), citing McMullin's paper "A Case for Scientific Realism" in the book Scientific Realism, edited by Jarrett Leplin (University of California Press, 1984).
- "Science and the Catholic Tradition"—appears as a chapter in part I (Introduction) of Science and Religion: New Perspectives on the Dialogue (1968), pages 30–42, ed. Ian Barbour
