= Celia Deane-Drummond =

Institute director (born 1956)

- Born: 1956 (age 69–70)
- Education: University of Cambridge; University of Reading
- Known for: Teaches systematic theology in relation to biological science
- Scientific career
- Fields: Theology
- Workplaces: Campion Hall

Celia Deane-Drummond is director of the Laudato Si’ Research Institute and senior research fellow in Theology at Campion Hall, Oxford, and Professor of Contemporary Catholic Theology at the Faculty of Theology and Religion, University of Oxford. She teaches systematic theology in relation to biological science - especially evolution, ecology, and genetics; bioethics - especially sustainability, ecotheology, and public theology.

Deane-Drummond gained a BA from the Girton College, Cambridge in natural sciences, and received her PhD in plant physiology at the University of Reading in 1980. During the 1980s she was a lecturer in plant physiology at Durham University. She later took a BA in theology from Trinity College, Bristol, then moved to Manchester University to take a PhD in systematic theology.

In 2000 she was appointed to a professorship in theology and the biological sciences at the University of Chester which she held until 2011. She was professor of theology at the University of Notre Dame from 2011 to 2019. In 2018, she founded the Laudato Si' Research Institute at Campion Hall in Oxford, where she is the current director. She is also the editor of the international journal Philosophy, Theology and the Sciences.

Her books include:

- Creation Through Wisdom: Theology and the New Biology (2003)
- Genetics and Christian Ethics (2006)
- Ecotheology (2008)
- Christ and Evolution (2009)
- Religion and Ecology in the Public Sphere (joint ed.) (2011)
- The Wisdom of the Liminal: Evolution and Other Animals in Human Becoming (2014)
- A Primer in Ecotheology: Theology for a Fragile Earth (2017)
- Shadow Sophia: The Evolution of Wisdom, Volume II (2021)
- Morality's Future and the Transcendent: The Evolution of Wisdom, Volume III (2026)
