= Brian Leftow =

American philosopher

Academic background
- Education: Yale University

Academic work
- Discipline: Philosophy
- Sub-discipline: Metaphysics; philosophy of religion
- Institutions: University of Oxford; Rutgers University
- Doctoral students: Max Baker-Hytch

Brian Leftow (born 1956) is an American philosopher specializing in philosophy of religion, medieval philosophy, and metaphysics. He is the William P. Alston Professor for the Philosophy of Religion at Rutgers University. Previously, he held the Nolloth Chair of the Philosophy of the Christian Religion at Oriel College, Oxford, succeeding Richard Swinburne.

== Education and career ==
Leftow is a graduate of Grove City College, and earned his M.A and Ph.D. at Yale University. Before becoming Nolloth Professor of the Philosophy of the Christian Religion at the University of Oxford, Leftow taught at Fordham University. In fall 2018, he took up the William P. Alston Chair in Philosophy of Religion at Rutgers University.

== Philosophical Work ==
Leftow's research interests include metaphysics, medieval philosophy, and philosophical theology. He proposed the so-called "Latin Trinity", which examined the tradition of Latin theories involving the Trinity. He likened this to an individual performing three roles, three events, and three time streams that are distinct for such individual but they occur simultaneously for others. Leftow has focused on the works of Thomas Aquinas, drawing from his arguments to theorize on God's omnipresence. On this subject, he noted that there is widespread consensus that God is eternal but there are disagreements regarding what it means. Leftow is also credited for proposing an explanation about the constant change in God prior to creation - that "God can delay creating to enjoy anticipating a universe and/or desiring to create one."

== Selected publications ==
- God and Necessity (2012)
- Divine Ideas, Ithaca: Cornell University Press, forthcoming.
- Matter, Parts and Number: Aquinas' Philosophy of Mathematics. Oxford, forthcoming.
- "Anti Social Trinitarianism," in Steven Davis and Daniel Kendall, eds., The Trinity. New York: Oxford University Press, 1999.
- "The Eternal Now," in Gregory Ganssle and David Woodruff, eds., God and Time. Oxford: Oxford University Press, 2002.
- "Necessary Being", and "Concepts of God," in The Encyclopedia of Philosophy. London: Routledge Press, 1998.
- "Anselm on the Cost of Salvation," Medieval Philosophy and Theology. 1997.
- "Eternity," in The Cambridge Companion to Philosophy of Religion, ed. Philip Quinn and Charles Taliaferro. Cambridge: Cambridge University Press, 1997.
- "Divine Action and Embodiment," Proceedings of the American Catholic Philosophical Association, 1997.
- "Can Philosophy Argue God's Existence?" in The Rationality of Belief and The Plurality of Faith, ed. Tom Senor. Ithaca, NY: Cornell University Press, 1995.
- Time and Eternity. Ithaca, NY: Cornell University Press, 1991.
