= Barry C. Smith =

British philosopher

Barry C. Smith is a British philosopher and director of the Institute of Philosophy at the School of Advanced Study at University of London. He also co-directs the Centre for the Study of the Senses. He has previously been a visiting professor at the University of California at Berkeley and at the École Normale Supérieure, and was the writer and presenter of the BBC World Service radio series, The Mysteries of the Brain. He has also done several interviews with Philosophy Bites.

== Selected publications ==
- "Understanding Language", Proceedings of the Aristotelian Society, New Series, Vol. 92 (1992), pp. 109–141.
- Knowing Our Own Minds. Oxford University Press, Oxford, 2000. (Edited with Crispin Wright and Cynthia Macdonald) ISBN 9780199241408
- The Oxford Handbook of Philosophy of Language. Oxford University Press, Oxford, 2006. (Edited with Ernest Lepore) ISBN 9780199259410
- Realism and Anti-Realism: An Enquiry into meaning, truth and objectivity. Polity, 2007. ISBN 9780745616001
- Questions of Taste: The Philosophy of Wine. Oxford University Press, Oxford, 2009. (Edited)
