= Murali Doraiswamy =

Indian physician-scientist, psychiatrist

P. Murali Doraiswamy
- Education: University of Madras
- Known for: precision medicine, Artificial intelligence in healthcare, Molecular diagnostics, Alzheimer's research
- Notable work: The Alzheimer's Action Plan
- Awards: Fellow of the Royal College of Physicians (London)
- Scientific career
- Fields: precision medicine, neuroscience, mental health
- Workplaces: Duke University School of Medicine

P. Murali Doraiswamy is an Indian physician-scientist, professor in psychiatry, neurology and medicine at Duke University School of Medicine. His work focuses on the fields of precision medicine, healthy aging, and clinical applications of AI. Doraiswamy has contributed to the clinical development of drugs, devices and diagnostics that are in wide use in clinical medicine. He has authored over 400 publications and co-authored the book The Alzheimer's Action Plan.

== Early life and education ==
Doraiswamy earned his Bachelor of Medicine, Bachelor of Surgery (MBBS) degree from the University of Madras, India. After completing his medical education, he pursued residency training at Duke University, where he has continued his continued his career in neuroscience and clinical research.

== Career ==
Doraiswamy serves as a professor in the Departments of Psychiatry, Neurology, and Medicine at Duke University School of Medicine. He is the director of the Neurocognitive Disorders Program and holds affiliations with the Duke-UNC Alzheimer’s Disease Research Center, Duke Center for the Study of Aging, the Duke Center for Applied Genomics and Precision Medicine, and the Duke Institute for Brain Sciences, and the Duke Microbiome Center. Doraiswamy was a visiting professor at the MIT Media Lab with the Affective Computing Research Group.

Doraiswamy has also served as an advisor to institutions including the National Institutes of Health (NIH), the Food and Drug Administration (FDA), the World Health Organization (WHO), and the World Economic Forum (WEF). He has chaired panels on brain research and innovation in mental health care. He has given expert testimony on suicide prevention at the US Sentate Committee on Armed Forces.

Doraiswamy served on the Board of Directors of Baycrest Health System, including Baycrest Hospital and the Rotman Research Institute, and was Co-Chair of the Innovation Advisory Council for the Centre for Aging + Brain Health Innovation (CABHI). He serves on the Board of Trustees of the Live Love Laugh Foundation, a leading NGO focused on rural mental health.

== Research and publications ==
His research centers on neurocognitive disorders, brain health, and the role of artificial intelligence in medicine, human performance and wellbeing. At Duke University, he leads a clinical trials unit that has contributed to the development of diagnostic tests, digital biomarkers, and treatments for multiple neurological, psychiatric, and medical conditions. His work has had an impact on Alzheimer's disease care, mental health, and resilience in aging.

=== Selected works ===
- The Alzheimer's Action Plan (co-authored, 2008) – A comprehensive guide for patients and caregivers dealing with Alzheimer's disease.
- Empowering 8 Billion minds
- Deep learning-aided decision support for diagnosis of skin disease across skin tones | Nature Medicine
- Digital Health COVID-19 Impact Assessment: Lessons Learned and Compelling Needs - NAM
- Harnessing artificial intelligence to transform Alzheimer’s disease research | Nature Medicine
- Digital cognitive twins in mental health | Nature Mental Health
- AI Is Revolutionizing Health Care. But It Can’t Replace Your Doctor
- "Artificial Intelligence and the Future of Psychiatry: Insights from a Global Physician Survey" (2019) – A study on the integration of Artificial intelligence in mental health care.
- "Neuroimaging Assessment of Early and Late Neurobiological Sequelae of Traumatic brain injury" (2015) – Research on brain injury and its potential link to Chronic traumatic encephalopathy (CTE).
- Multiple peer-reviewed articles on cognitive disorders, neuroplasticity, and digital health interventions.

== Public engagement and media ==
Doraiswamy's research has been featured in major media outlets, including The New York Times, TIME Magazine, Scientific American, The Wall Street Journal, and BBC News. He has appeared on television programs such as CBS Evening News, NPR, and The Dr. Oz Show.

== Awards and honors ==
- Recipient of research awards for contributions to Psychiatry and neurodegenerative research

== See also ==
- Neurocognitive disorders
- Alzheimer's disease research
- Psychiatry
- Artificial intelligence in medicine
