= Peter Ulric Tse =

American neuroscientist

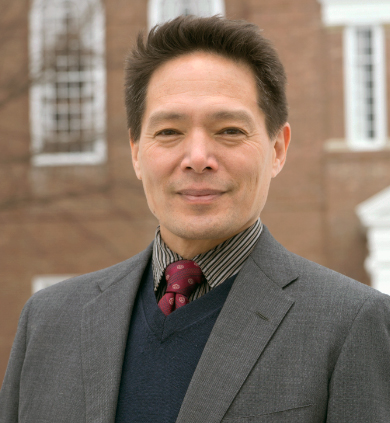
Peter Ulric Tse

Peter Ulric Tse (born Oct. 28, 1962) is an American cognitive neuroscientist in the Department of Psychological and Brain Sciences, Dartmouth College. He directs the NSF EPSCoR Attention Consortium. He was awarded a Guggenheim Fellowship in 2014.

== Early life and education ==
Tse, who has German and Chinese heritage, grew up in New York City. He graduated from Dartmouth College in 1984, studying physics and mathematics. After graduating from Dartmouth, he worked for the Peace Corps as a schoolteacher in Nepal but E.T.’d (left before his service was through), then studied philosophy of mind at the University of Konstanz, Germany, and worked for Kobe Steel Corporation in Japan. He began his studies at Harvard University in 1992, receiving his PhD in cognitive psychology under Patrick Cavanagh and Ken Nakayama in 1998. Tse served as a postdoctoral researcher with Nikos Logothetis at the Max Planck Institute for Biological Cybernetics in Tübingen, Germany. He joined Dartmouth's faculty in 2001.

== Cognitive neuroscience ==
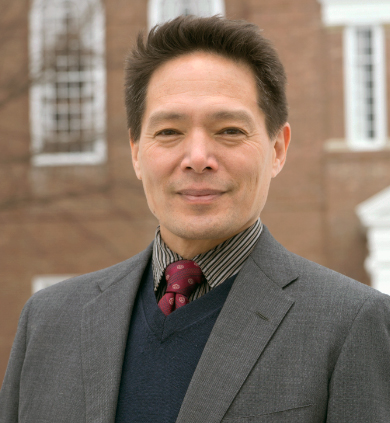
Peter Ulric Tse, Professor of Cognitive Neuroscience, Dartmouth College

The focus of Tse's work in cognitive neuroscience is mid- and high-level human vision. In the domain of mid-level vision his group has worked on deciphering the rapid form-motion computations that go into the construction of subsequent conscious visual experience. His group focuses on visual illusions because they are mistakes made by the visual system that can inform us about the nature of processing that goes into the construction of conscious experience.

In the field of high-level vision and attention, Tse's group has focused on two main directions: the influence of top-down volitional operations on visual experience, and the nature of volitional mental operations that go into the construction of internal virtual experience or imagination.

In his work on the neural basis of the human imagination, he has emphasized the importance of volitional and non-volitional verb-like mental operations over noun-like representations, such as imagined visual objects. Using fMRI, his group has argued that representations and operations can be decoded by creating classifiers in one part of the brain, and applying them to different parts of the brain. This supports the idea that the brain might not be as modular as previously thought, and that certain types of brain processing may happen in a fundamentally distributed manner. In particular, the model of working memory operations that emerges suggests that traditional models of working memory, such as Baddeley's, are too modular and hierarchical.

== Philosophy of neuroscience ==
In his 2013 book The Neural Basis of Free Will, Tse focused on the question of mental causation, in particular the proposition that mental events (and information in general, as in genetics) can be downwardly causal even though realized in, or supervenient upon, physical events.

Exclusion argument: He challenged the Exclusion Argument (EA) of Jaegwon Kim, according to which causal efficacy resides solely in the physical domain of the rootmost level of energy, by arguing that the EA does not hold if indeterminism is the case. This, he argues, provides an opening for information to be downwardly causal in the universe, whether high-level supervenient events such as conscious percepts or a concept, such as that of a 'home-run' in a baseball game, or 'voting' in a democracy. Information is downwardly causal, not as a force, he argues, but by filtering out possible paths that are open at the particle level which are not consistent with informational criteria. Under 'criterial causation' (see below) only physically causal paths which are also informational causal paths are permitted to occur in the nervous system and other information processing systems, such as underlie genetic inheritance, protein formation, membrane channel formation, or social interactions such as speaking or institutional interactions. Possible physical particle-level paths which do not meet high-level informational criteria are effectively filtered out by a criterial assessment. Thus information is causal, not as a force, or via attributes such as impact or force, but is causal as a filter on what possibilities can become real.

Criterial causation: Tse gets around the impossibility of self-causation (i.e. of informational events altering their own physical basis) by positing what he has variously called 'parameter-,' 'pattern-,' 'phase-' or 'criterial causation'. According to Tse, Science and Philosophy have overly focused on 'active' modes of causation, such as Newtonian energy transfer among billiard balls. He points out that manipulationist and interventionist conceptions of causation, such as those of Woodward, have largely neglected the 'passive' causal efficacy of manipulations of parameters for responses to subsequent inputs. For example, a neuron tuned to 'dog' at one moment can be reparameterized to respond optimally to 'cat' in subsequent input by altering the chains of synaptic weights that feed driving input into that neuron.

The neural code: Tse argues that thinking of the neural code as one where neural spikes trigger neural spikes, much like billiard balls triggering motion in other billiard balls, is misleading and incomplete. He argues that the neural code is in fact as much a synaptic reweighting (i.e. informational reparameterization) code as it is a code based on neural spikes or action potentials.

Tse argues that criterial causation offers a middle path between the extremes of determinism, where one's decisions and their consequences were 'set in stone' ages before one was even born, and informationally unconstrained indeterminism, where decisions happen randomly, for no reason at all. He argues that David Hume was wrong when he wrote "tis impossible to admit of any medium betwixt chance and an absolute necessity." The middle path between the two is afforded by criterial causation. For example, if commanded to think of a woman politician, people will name whichever one comes to mind first. But if the universe could be rewound to the moment of the command, they might have generated a different name, say 'Margaret Thatcher' this time instead of 'Angela Merkel'. This was not utterly random, since it had to meet the criteria of being a woman and a politician, but it was also not determined, and might have turned out otherwise.

Free will: Tse argues that discussants often argue past each other because they have different underlying definitions of the term 'free will'. If one has (1) a 'low-octane' definition according to which one's decisions and intentions can influence one's subsequent actions uncoerced by external forces or intentions, one can believe that free will is compatible with determinism, because nowhere in this definition is it required that events have the possibility of turning out otherwise. However, if one has a (2) 'mid-octane' definition, where this requirement must be met, then, by definition, one must hold that free will is incompatible with determinism, where there is only one possible unfolding of events. One must also be an incompatibilist under (3) a 'high-octane' definition of free will, which Tse also terms 'metafree will', according to which one must have the capacity not only to choose among possible courses of action as in (2), but to choose among possibilities that entail becoming a different kind of chooser in the future. Tse argues that the human brain realizes both types (3) and (2) free will, whereas other animals, such as a tiger, realize type (2) only. As such, Tse is an incompatibilist regarding definitions (2) and (3), and a compatibilist regarding definition (1). He believes indeterminism is the case, so falls in the camp of Free Will Libertarianism along with philosophers such as Robert Kane. For example, a tiger seeing a tapir in the Sumatran jungle can internally weigh various possible paths toward capturing the tapir given criteria such as path and effort minimization and stealth maximization. But no tiger thinks to itself, "next year I want to become a different kind of tiger, one that eats fewer tapirs and more pangolins." A human, in contrast, can envision future possible selves, weigh their merits, and then choose to become a desired self, and with effort realize such a self. For example, a person may desire to learn a foreign language, envision learning numerous possible foreign languages, deliberate among them, weighing various pros and cons, and then select, say, 'Swahili'. After a year of hard work, a person can have transformed their nervous system into a new type of nervous system and mind, namely, one that can now process Swahili inputs and produce Swahili outputs. As such, Tse views the human imagination to be the central engine of free will, when combined with the physical and motivational wherewithal to realize imagined futures.

In contrast, he has argued that the Libet experiments (where preceding brain activity can be used to decode picking this versus that option, such as turning left versus right, or the timing of an event, such as a finger motion, before a person becomes conscious of willing) are largely irrelevant to free will, because free will is rooted in imaginative deliberation and choosing, not picking among arbitrary and meaningless alternatives. Libet's picking paradigm also misses the fundamental importance of willpower in realizing envisioned future paths or future selves, where, for example, a person can envision numerous possible flying machines, but then must also have the determination and perseverance to build that machine, and thereby transform the world, as the Wright brothers did. Similarly, he has dismissed Wegner's claims that there is no free will with the statement, "Just as the existence of visual illusions does not prove that all vision is illusory, the existence of illusions of conscious agency does not prove that conscious operations cannot be causal of action in certain cases."
