= Bernard Carr =

British mathematics and astronomy professor

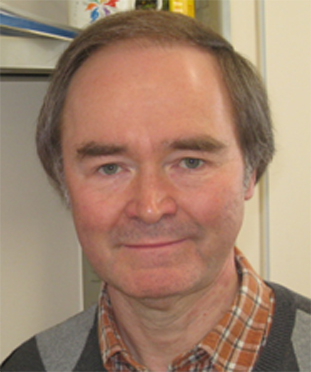
- Education: Trinity College, Cambridge (BA); Institute of Astronomy, Cambridge (PhD)
- Occupations: Professor of mathematics and astronomy

Bernard J. Carr is a British professor of mathematics and astronomy at Queen Mary University of London (QMUL).

His research interests include the early universe, dark matter, general relativity, primordial black holes, and the anthropic principle.

== Education ==
He completed his BA in mathematics in 1972 at Trinity College, Cambridge. For his doctorate, obtained in 1976, he studied relativity and cosmology under Stephen Hawking at the Institute of Astronomy in Cambridge. He was the president of the Cambridge University Buddhist Society and is friends with Therevada Buddhist monk and abbot Ajahn Brahm.

== Academic career ==
In 1976 he was elected to a Fellowship at Trinity and he also became an advanced SERC fellow at the Institute of Astronomy. In 1979 he was awarded a Lindemann Fellowship for post-doctoral research in America and spent a year working in various universities there. In 1980 he took up a senior research fellowship at the Institute of Astronomy in Cambridge. In 1985 he moved to the then Queen Mary College, University of London, where he is now professor of mathematics and astronomy.

He has held visiting professorships at Kyoto University, Tokyo University and the Fermi National Accelerator Laboratory, and is a frequent visitor to other institutes in America and Canada. He is the author of more than two hundred scientific papers and his monograph, Cosmological Gravitational Waves, won the 1985 Adams Essay Prize.

== Interests outside academia ==
He has interests outside physics, including psychic research. He has been a member of the Society for Psychical Research (SPR) for thirty years, serving as its education officer and the chairman of its research activities committee for various periods. He was president of the SPR from 2000 to 2004. He is currently president of Scientific and Medical Network (SMN) in the UK.

He has been the co-holder of a grant from the John Templeton Foundation for a project entitled Fundamental Physics and the Problem of our Existence. He is the editor of a book based on a series of conferences funded by the Foundation, entitled Universe or Multiverse? Bernard Carr also made an appearance in the documentary film The Trouble with Atheism, where he discussed these concepts, and also appeared in the science documentary film Target...Earth? (1980).
