= Alfred Mele =

American philosopher (born 1951)

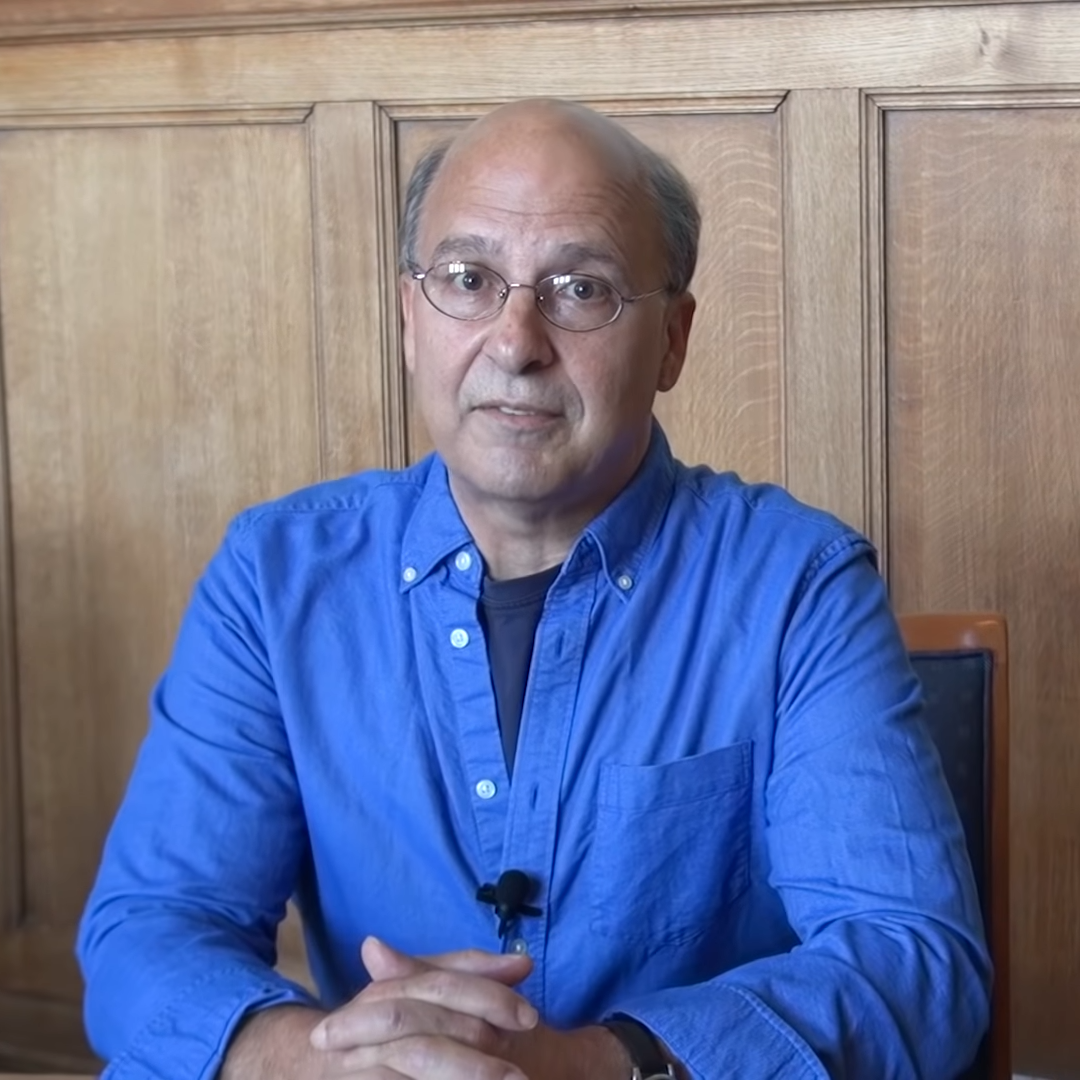
Mele in 2017

Alfred Remen Mele (born 1951) is an American philosopher and the William H. and Lucyle T. Werkmeister Professor of Philosophy at Florida State University. He is also the past Director of the Philosophy and Science of Self-Control Project (2014-2017) and the Big Questions in Free Will Project (2010-2013). Mele is the author of thirteen books and over 250 articles.

Mele attended Wayne State University and received his doctorate in philosophy from the University of Michigan in 1979. He taught at Davidson College from 1979 until 2000, when he took up his present position at Florida State University.

== Free will and other topics ==
Mele began his career writing about Aristotle and practical reason, but gradually moved into a focus on contemporary issues in the philosophy of mind and action. While not taking a stand on the question whether free will is or is not compatible with determinism, Mele develops positive conceptions of how free will may be implemented from both “compatibilist” and “incompatibilist” perspectives. He also has argued that claims that scientists have proved that free will is an illusion are not credible. Mele is also known for his development of a causal theory of how intentional actions are produced and for his deflationary view of self-deception.

== Bibliography (partial) ==
=== Books (as author) ===
- Free Will: An Opinionated Guide. Oxford University Press, 2022.
- Manipulated Agents: A Window to Moral Responsibility. Oxford University Press, 2019.
- Aspects of Agency: Decisions, Abilities, Explanations, and Free Will. Oxford University Press, 2017.
- Free: Why Science Hasn't Disproved Free Will. Oxford University Press, 2014.
- A Dialogue on Free Will and Science. Oxford University Press, 2014.
- Backsliding: Understanding Weakness of Will. Oxford University Press, 2012.
- Effective Intentions. Oxford University Press, 2009.
- Free Will and Luck. Oxford University Press, 2006.
- Motivation and Agency. Oxford University Press, 2003.
- Self-Deception Unmasked. Princeton University Press, 2001.
- Autonomous Agents: From Self-Control to Autonomy. Oxford University Press, 1995.
- Springs of Action: Understanding Intentional Behavior. Oxford University Press, 1992.
- Irrationality: An Essay on Akrasia, Self-Deception, and Self-Control. Oxford University Press, 1987.

=== Books (as editor) ===
- Surrounding Self-Control — (Oxford University Press, 2020)
- Surrounding Free Will — (Oxford University Press, 2015)
- Free Will and Consciousness: How Might They Work? — (Oxford University Press, 2010; R. Baumeister, A. Mele, and K. Vohs, eds.)
- Rationality and the Good — (Oxford University Press, 2007; M. Timmons, J. Greco, and A. Mele, eds.)
- The Oxford Handbook of Rationality — (Oxford University Press, 2004; A. Mele and P. Rawling, eds.)
- The Philosophy of Action — (Oxford University Press, Oxford Readings in Philosophy, 1997; A. Mele, ed.)
- Mental Causation — (Oxford: Clarendon Press, 1993; J. Heil and A. Mele, eds.)

== See also ==
- American philosophy
- List of American philosophers
