= Hugh McCann =

Scottish footballer and manager

Hugh McCann (born 6 May 1954) is a Scottish former football player and manager. McCann signed for Celtic aged 14, but a knee injury halted his progress there. He later played for Linlithgow Rose, Alloa Athletic, Berwick Rangers and East Stirlingshire. He then managed Alloa Athletic, Queen's Park and East Stirlingshire. He has run the youth development systems of Alloa Athletic and Raith Rovers. McCann has also worked in coaching roles for Hearts, Aberdeen, Kilmarnock and Dundee.

== Sources ==
- Hugh McCann at Post War English & Scottish Football League A–Z Player's Transfer Database
