= David Shatz =

American philosopher (born 1948)

- Born: 1948 (age 77–78)

Education
- Education: Columbia University (PhD)

Philosophical work
- Era: 21st-century philosophy
- Region: Western philosophy
- Institutions: Yeshiva University

David Shatz (born 1948) is an American philosopher and Ronald P. Stanton University Professor of Philosophy at Yeshiva University. He is known for his works on philosophy of religion and ethics.

== Books ==
- Peer Review: A Critical Inquiry (Rowman & Littlefield, 2004)
- Jewish Thought in Dialogue: Essays on Thinkers, Theologies, and Moral Theories, (Boston: Academic Studies Press, 2009)

=== Edited ===
- Contemporary Philosophy of Religion, Oxford University Press, 1982.
- Definitions and Definability: Philosophical Perspectives, Kluwer Publishing Co., 1991.
- Rabbi Abraham Isaac Kook and Jewish Spirituality, New York University Press, 1995.
- Tikkun Olam: Social Responsibility in Jewish Thought and Law, Jason Aronson Press, 1997.
- Family Redeemed: Essays on Family Relationships, by Rabbi Joseph B. Soloveitchik, Toras HoRav Foundation, 2000.
- Philosophy and Faith: A Philosophy of Religion Reader (McGraw-Hill, 2002)
- Questions About God (Oxford University Press, 2002)
- Out of the Whirlwind: Essays on Suffering and Mourning, by Rabbi Joseph B. Soloveitchik. (Ktav/Toras HoRav Foundation, 2003).
- Mind, Body and Judaism (Ktav/YU Press, 2004]
- Judaism, Science, and Moral Responsibility (Rowman & Littlefield, 2005).
- Rabbi Joseph B. Soloveitchik, Abraham’s Journey: Reflections on The Life of the Founding Patriarch (Toras HoRav Foundation/Ktav, 2007)
- Rabbi Joseph B. Soloveitchik, Vision and Leadership (Ktav: Toras HoRav Foundation, 2012; August 2012 release)
- Associate Editor for Theism section, Theism and Atheism (Cengage, 2019)
