= Joyce E. Penner =

Atmospheric scientist

Joyce Elaine Penner
- Education: Harvard University
- Scientific career
- Workplaces: University of Michigan
- Thesis: Photochemistry and transport processes for terrestrial atmospheric H_{2} and Venus exospheric H (1977)

Joyce Penner is an atmospheric scientist known for her research on climate change, especially on the impact of aerosols and clouds.

== Education and career ==
Penner has a B.A. in mathematics from the University of California Santa Barbara (1970), and an M.S. and a Ph.D. in applied mathematics from Harvard University (1972 and 1977, respectively). Penner moved to Lawrence Livermore National Laboratory in 1977 and remained there until 1996, serving as a group leader from 1987 until her departure for University of Michigan in 1996. At the University of Michigan, Penner was named the Ralph J. Cicerone Distinguished University Professor of Atmospheric Science in 2007.

Penner has contributed to multiple reports from the Intergovernmental Panel on Climate Change (IPCC), which was awarded the 2007 Nobel Peace Prize for its series of assessment reports. Penner was the coordinating lead author for chapter 5 on "Aerosols, their Direct and Indirect Effects" within the 2001 Assessment Report 3, Working Group 1 (AR3 WG1), and one of 18 lead authors for the technical summary of that same report. In 2007, she was one of 7 lead authors for chapter 9 on "Understanding and attributing climate change". In 2013, she served as a review editor for chapter 7 (Clouds and aerosols, and for the technical summary. She was also one of the contributing authors for the 1995 IPCC report.

Penner was the president of the Atmospheric Sciences Section of the American Geophysical Union from 2017 to 2018. Since 2019 she has been the president of the International Association of Meteorology and Atmospheric Sciences.

== Research ==
Penner's research interests focus on climate modeling, specifically the representation of aerosols in global climate models. Through her research, Penner has shown that the composition of aerosols impacts whether particles will increase or decrease global temperatures. For example, her investigation into how biomass burning produces aerosols concluded that smoke from burning tropical forests may cause cooling by an indirect effect because of the formation of droplets that reflect sunlight away from Earth's surface. Within her climate models, Penner has examined the role of nitrogen compounds and her research revealed that the nitric acid produced by supersonic aircraft (e.g., the Concorde) can lead to decreases in atmospheric ozone concentrations. She has also defined the uncertainties associated with modeling indirect aerosol forcing, including a consideration of differences across a suite of models. This indirect aerosol effect impacts the amount of radiation received at Earth's surface which is a function of how aerosol particles are formed.

=== Selected publications ===
- Penner, J. E.; Dickinson, R. E.; O'Neill, C. A. (1992-06-05). "Effects of Aerosol from Biomass Burning on the Global Radiation Budget". Science. 256 (5062): 1432–1434. Bibcode:1992Sci...256.1432P. doi:10.1126/science.256.5062.1432. ISSN 0036-8075. PMID 17791612. S2CID 44613556.
- Taylor, K. E.; Penner, J. E. (June 1994). "Response of the climate system to atmospheric aerosols and greenhouse gases". Nature. 369 (6483): 734–737. Bibcode:1994Natur.369..734T. doi:10.1038/369734a0. S2CID 4262188.
- Tegen, Ina; Hollrig, Peter; Chin, Mian; Fung, Inez; Jacob, Daniel; Penner, Joyce (1997). "Contribution of different aerosol species to the global aerosol extinction optical thickness: Estimates from model results". Journal of Geophysical Research: Atmospheres. 102 (D20): 23895–23915. Bibcode:1997JGR...10223895T. doi:10.1029/97JD01864.
- Penner, J.E.; Andreae, M.O.; Annegarn, H.; Barrie, L.; Feichter, J.; Hegg, D.; Jayaraman, A.; Leaitch, R.; Murphy, D.; Nganga, J.; Pitari, G. (2001). "Aerosols, their Direct and Indirect Effects". Climate Change 2001: The Scientific Basis. Contribution of Working Group I to the Third Assessment Report of the Intergovernmental Panel on Climate Change: 289–348. hdl:11858/00-001M-0000-0014-921E-5.

== Awards and honors ==
- Fellow, American Geophysical Union (1999)
- Fellow, American Association for the Advancement of Science (2009)
- Haagen-Smit Clean Air Award, California Air Resources Board (2016)
