= Anjan Chatterjee (neuroscientist) =

American neurologist (born 1958)

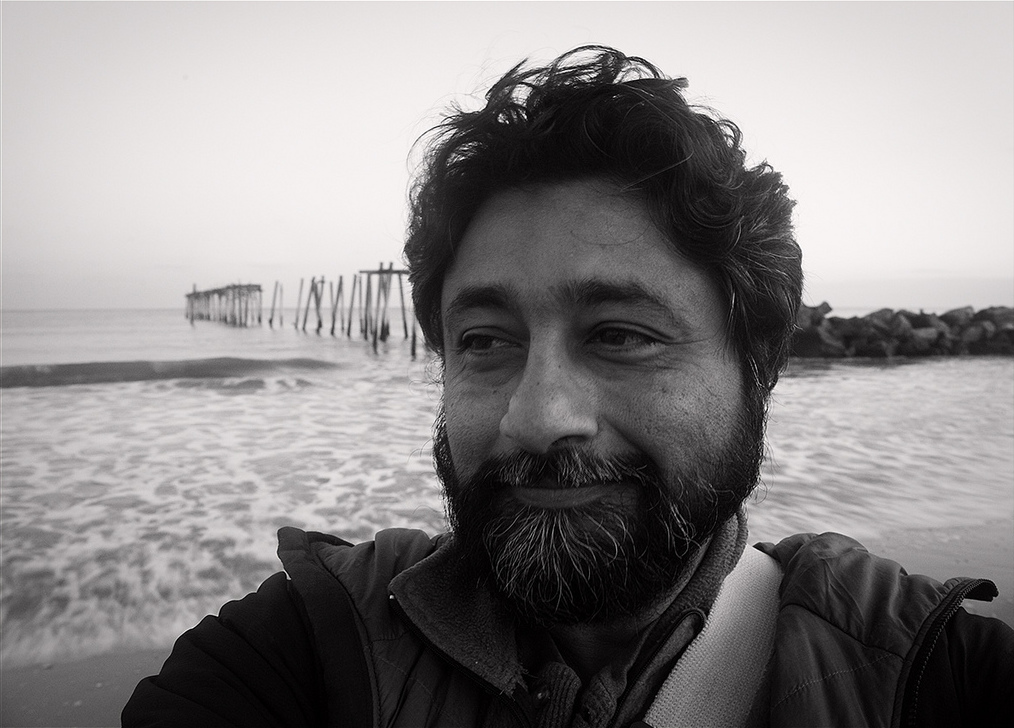
- Born: October 22, 1958 (age 68); Bhopal, India
- Education: Haverford College, The University of Pennsylvania
- Awards: The Norman Geschwind Prize in Behavioral Neurology (2002)
- Scientific career
- Fields: Cognitive neuroscience, Cognitive neurology, neuroesthetics, neuroethics
- Workplaces: The University of Pennsylvania
- Website: Penn Center for Neuroaesthetics (PCfN), ChatLab

Anjan Chatterjee (born October 22, 1958) is a professor of neurology at the Perelman School of Medicine at the University of Pennsylvania. He is director of the Penn Center for Neuroaesthetics (PCfN) and a member of the Center for Cognitive Neuroscience. His research focuses on spatial cognition and its relationship to language. He also conducts neuroaesthetics research and writes about the ethical use of neuroscience findings in society.

He is the past president of the International Association of Empirical Aesthetics and the past chair of the Society for Behavioral and Cognitive Neurology.

== Background ==
Chatterjee obtained his BA in philosophy from Haverford College in 1980 and his MD from the University of Pennsylvania in 1985. After his internship at the Medical College of Pennsylvania, he trained in neurology at The University of Chicago. He then completed two research fellowships, one at Case Western Reserve University with Peter Whitehouse] and a second at The University of Florida with Kenneth Heilman. He was a member of the neurology faculty at The University of Alabama at Birmingham before returning to the University of Pennsylvania. He is a Fellow of the American Academy of Neurology and a founding board member of the International Neuroethics Society. He is also a board member for Haverford College, the Associated Services for the Blind and Visually Impaired], and Universal Promise (a non-profit educational organization).

He is on the editorial boards of: The Journal of Cognitive Neuroscience, Cognitive and Behavioral Neurology, Behavioural Neurology, European Neurology, Neuropsychology, Empirical Studies of the Arts, and the American Journal of Bioethics: Neuroscience.

== Research interests ==
=== Spatial cognition, event representation and language ===
Chatterjee combines functional neuroimaging and studies with patients with neurological disease to probe cognitive systems. He has investigated the neural representations of actions, spatial, and causal relations. He is also interested in the relationship of perception and conception and language. Based on his research, he has been skeptical of strong views of embodied cognition.

=== Neuroaesthetics ===
Chatterjee has examined the paradoxical facilitation of artistic production. Some individuals' art changes and even improves after brain damage and tries to understand what such phenomena tell us about the nature of artistic practices. More generally, he has been instrumental in articulating the promise and limitations of neuroaesthetics.

=== Neuroethics ===
In 2004, Chatterjee coined the term "cosmetic neurology" to describe how advances in clinical neurosciences might be used to enhance the abilities of healthy people and the ethical issues that follow from this practice. He has argued that some form of enhancement is here to stay and that we should be mindful of the shape that these practices take. He has also written about the problems that arise when commercial and health care interests collide.

== Selected publications ==
- A. Chatterjee & M. J. Farah (eds.). (2013). Neuroethics in Practice. New York, NY: Oxford University Press.
