= John Kao =

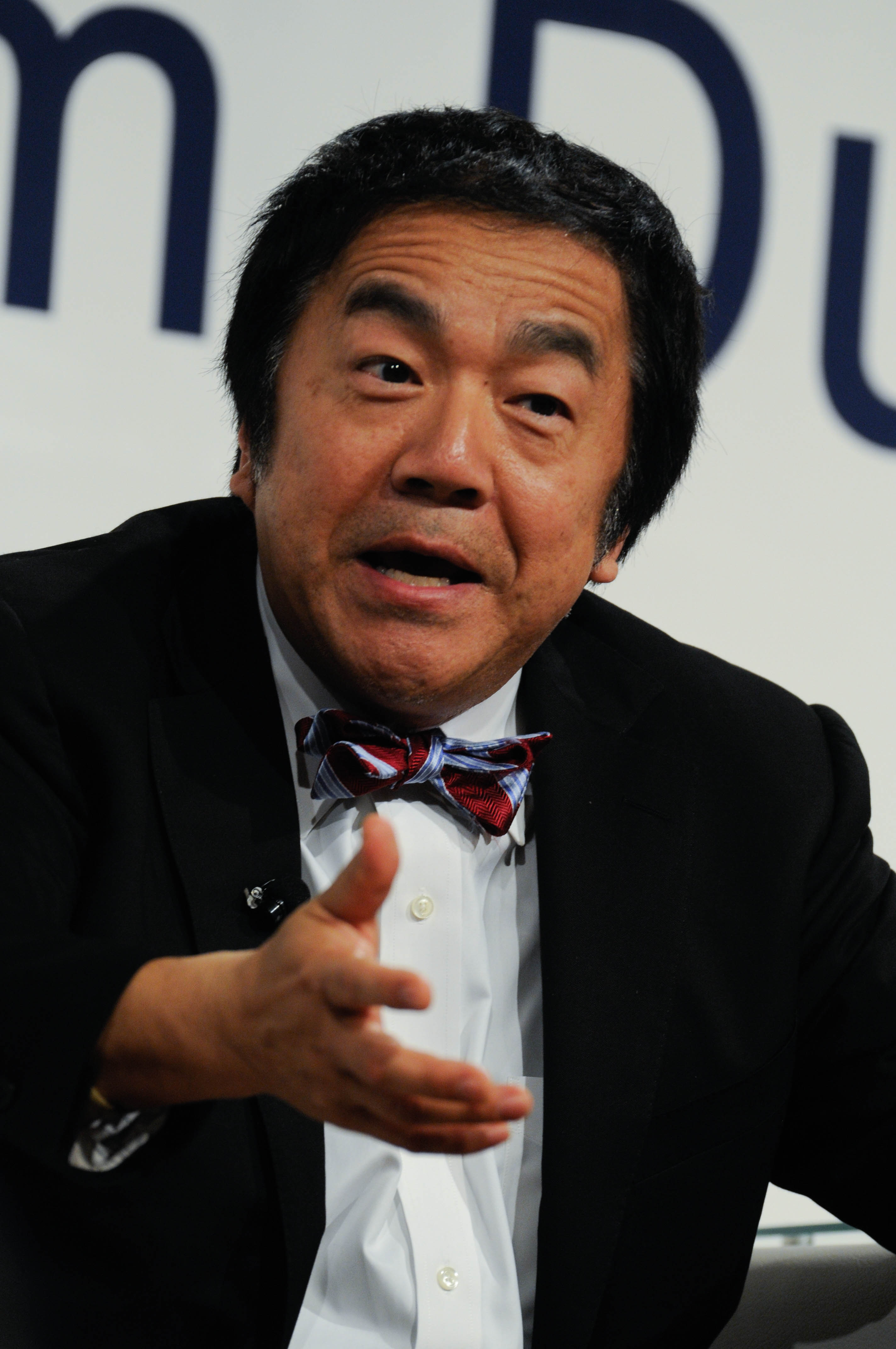
John Kao at the World Economic Forum Summit on the Global Agenda in 2010

John Kao (born 1950) is an author and strategic advisor based in Connecticut. His work concentrates on issues of innovation and organizational transformation.

== Life and career ==
Kao was born in 1950 to Chinese immigrant parents. An accomplished jazz pianist, he spent the summer of 1969 playing keyboards for Frank Zappa. Kao studied philosophy at Yale College, received an MD from Yale Medical School, and an MBA from Harvard Business School. He taught at Harvard Business School from 1982 to 1996, where he specialized in innovation and entrepreneurship. He has also held faculty appointments at the Massachusetts Institute of Technology Media Lab, Yale College, and the Naval Postgraduate School.

His advisory work for Senator Hillary Clinton, including his ideas on innovation and transformation, was described in The New York Times as "out of the box".

In 2000, Kao became CEO of Ealing Films. He also founded Kao Ventures, and San Francisco-based The Idea Factory, working with Internet-related startups. He also shared producer credits for Sex, Lies, and Videotape and Mr. Baseball.

== Publications ==
Key publications include:

- Kao, John (1996). Jamming: The Art and Discipline of Business Creativity. HarperCollins. ISBN 0-88730-864-3.
- Kao, John (2007). Innovation Nation: How America Is Losing Its Innovation Edge, Why It Matters, and What We Can Do to Get It Back. Free Press. ISBN 978-1-4165-3268-2.
