= Wentzel van Huyssteen =

South African professor and theologian (1942–2022)

J. Wentzel van Huyssteen (29 April 1942 – 18 February 2022) was a religious philosopher, author and university professor in South Africa and the United States.

He was born in Burgersdorp, South Africa, and was ordained as part of the Dutch Reformed Church in South Africa; he received his MA in philosophy from the Stellenbosch University in South Africa, and his PhD in philosophical theology from the Free University of Amsterdam. His areas of expertise were theology and science as well as religion and scientific epistemology.

He was the Head of the Department of Religion at the University of Port Elizabeth, South Africa, from 1972 to 1991.

He joined Princeton Theological Seminary in 1992 and was the first occupant of the James I. McCord Chair in Theology and Science.

He was on the editorial board for the American Journal of Theology and Philosophy, the Nederduits Gereformeerde Teologiese Tydskrif, and the Journal of Theology and Science, and was coeditor of the Science and Religion Series (Ashgate Press). In 2004 he was selected to deliver the esteemed Gifford Lectures, in which he presented his work titled “Alone in the World? Science and Theology on Human Uniqueness.” Van Huysteen also worked on cooperation with archaeologists, and published an article on the development of self in Çatalhöyük.

After retiring from Princeton Theological Seminary, he moved back to South Africa.

Two Festschrifts were published in his honour.

== Family ==
Van Huysteen was married with children.

== Major publications ==
- Theology and the Justification of Faith: Constructing Theories in Systematic Theology (1987)
- Essays in Postfoundationalist Theology (July 1997)
- Rethinking Theology and Science: Six Models for the Current Discussion (edited with Niels H. Gregersen; July 1998)
- Duet or Duel? Theology and Science in a Postmodern World (SCM/Trinity Press, 1998)
- The Shaping of Rationality: Toward Interdisciplinarity in Theology and Science (Wm. B. Eerdmans Publishing Company, 1999)
- The Encyclopedia of Science and Religion (Two volumes). Editor-in-chief (Macmillan Publishers, 2003)
- Alone in the World? Human Uniqueness in Science and Theology (Wm. B. Eerdmans Publishing Company, 2006)
- Ashgate Science and Religion Series: Anna Case-Winters, Reconstructing a Christian Theology of Nature: Down to Earth, coedited with Roger Trigg. Series Editors (Adlershot: Ashgate Press, 2007)
- In Search of Self: Interdisciplinary Perspectives on Personhood (2015)
- Also, Christopher Lilley and Daniel J. Pedersen (Eds.), Human Origins and the Image of God: Essays in honor of J. Wentzel van Huyssteen (Wm. B. Eerdmans Publishing Company, 2017)
