= Michael Tooley =

Canadian-born American philosopher (born 1941)

- Born: 1941 (age 84–85); Toronto, Canada

Education
- Education: University of Toronto, Princeton University

Philosophical work
- Era: Contemporary philosophy
- Region: Western philosophy
- School: Analytic philosophy
- Institutions: University of Colorado Boulder
- Main interests: Metaphysics, applied ethics, philosophy of science, philosophy of religion
- Notable ideas: Growing block universe

Michael Tooley (born 1941) is a Canadian-born American philosopher, now emeritus at the University of Colorado, Boulder, best known for his contributions to metaphysics.

== Education and career ==
He has a BA from the University of Toronto and earned his Ph.D. in philosophy at Princeton University in 1968. He taught at Stanford University and the Australian National University and since 1992 at the University of Colorado Boulder.

== Philosophical work ==
Tooley has worked on philosophy of science, philosophy of religion, causality and metaphysical naturalism, and has debated the existence of God with William Lane Craig. His early paper "Abortion and Infanticide", arguing that there is no moral difference between them and that both are permissible, has been controversial.

Tooley was elected a Corresponding Fellow of the Australian Academy of the Humanities in 1992.

== Works ==
- Causation: A Defense of a Non-Reductionist Approach (Oxford University Press, 2026)
- The Problem of Evil (Elements in the Philosophy of Religion) (Cambridge: Cambridge University Press, 2019)
- Abortion – Three Perspectives (Oxford: Oxford University Press, 2009)
- Knowledge of God (with Alvin Plantinga, Oxford: Blackwell Publishing, 2008)
- Metaphysics (New York: Garland Publishing, 1999). In five volumes: Volume 1 - Laws of Nature, Causation, and Supervenience; Volume 2 - The Nature of Time; Volume 3 - Properties; Volume 4 - Particulars, Actuality, and Identity; Volume 5 - Necessity and Possibility.
- Time, Tense, and Causation (Oxford: Oxford University Press, 1997)
- Causation (Oxford: Oxford University Press, Readings in Philosophy Series, 1993). Co-edited with Ernest Sosa.
- Causation: A Realist Approach (Oxford: Oxford University Press, 1987)
- Abortion and Infanticide (Oxford, 1985 [1983])
