= Warren S. Brown =

American psychologist

Warren Shelburne Brown
- Born: September 8, 1944 (age 81)
- Education: B.A. Psychology at Point Loma Nazarene University (1966, magna cum laude); M.A. Experimental Psychology at the University of Southern California (1968); Ph.D. Experimental Psychology at the University of Southern California (1971)
- Spouse: Janet Brown (deceased)
- Awards: § Awards and honors
- Scientific career
- Theses: Evoked Potential Correlates of Information Delivery and Uncertainty in Downs Syndrome and Normal Children (1968); Visual Evoked Potentials, Laterality of Eye Movements and the Asymmetry of Brain Functions (1971)
- Website: fuller.edu/faculty/warren-s-brown/

Warren S. Brown (born September 8, 1944) is a professor of psychology in the Graduate School of Psychology at Fuller Theological Seminary and the founding director of the Travis Research Institute. Brown received his doctorate in Experimental Physiological Psychology from the University of Southern California (1971). Prior to Fuller, Brown spent 11 years as a research scientist at the UCLA Brain Research Institute. He was a founding member of the National Organization for Disorders of the Corpus Callosum, the International Research Consortium on the Corpus Callosum and Cerebral Connectivity (IRC5), and the International Society for Science and Religion. The "Warren and Janet Brown Scholarship", given at Fuller to support students in neuropsychological research, was created to honor Brown and his late wife.

== Neuropsychological research ==
Warren Brown is involved in experimental neuropsychological research related to functions of the corpus callosum of the brain and its relationship to higher cognitive processes in humans. In particular, he has been studying the implications of agenesis of the corpus callosum (i.e., congenital absence of the corpus callosum, the pathway that connects the right and left hemispheres). Brown has been interested in the implications of this disorder for mental abilities and social awareness. Over the last 30+ years his lab has conducted one of the largest studies accomplished thus far (both in number of subjects and depth of testing) on cognitive and social disabilities of individuals with agenesis of the corpus callosum. He has authored or coauthored over 100 scholarly articles in peer-reviewed scientific journals; 60 other articles and chapters in edited scholarly books; and over 200 presentations at scientific meetings. Over the last several years, Brown and his students have also studied of the cognitive and psychosocial abilities of adults who had a hemispherectomy in childhood.

== Selected publications ==
=== Books ===
- Warren Brown, Nancey Murphy and H. Newton Maloney (eds.) Whatever Happened to the Soul? Scientific and Theological Portraits of Human Nature. Minneapolis: Fortress Press, 1998. Won the "Outstanding Books in Theology and the Natural Sciences Prize", awarded by the Center for Theology and the Natural Sciences in 1999.
- Nancey Murphy and Warren Brown. Did My Neurons Make Me Do It? : Philosophical and Neurobiological Perspectives on Moral Responsibility and Free Will. Oxford, U.K., Oxford University Press, 2007.
- Malcolm Jeeves and Warren Brown. Neuroscience, Psychology and Religion: Illusions, Delusions, and Realities about Human Nature. Radnor, Penn: Templeton Press, 2009.
- Strawn, B.D. and Brown, W.S. Enhancing Christian Life: How Extended Cognition Augments Religious Community. Intervarsity Press, 2020.
- Brown, W.S. and Strawn, B.D. The Physical Nature of Christian Life: Neuroscience, Psychology and the Church. Cambridge, UK: Cambridge University Press, 2021.

=== Research articles ===
- Brown, W.S., Anderson, L., Symington, M. F. & Paul, L.K. (2021) "Decision-Making in Agenesis of the Corpus Callosum: Expectancy-Valence in the Iowa Gambling Task" Archives of Clinical Neuropsychology. 27(5): 532-544.
- Brown, W.S., Burnett, K., Vaillancourt, A., & Paul, L.K. (2021) “Appreciation of Social Norms in Agenesis of the Corpus Callosum.” Archives of Clinical Neuropsychology. doi:10.1093/arclin/acab003
- Renteria-Vazquez, T., Brown, W.S., Kang, C., Graves, M., Castelli, F., & Paul, L.K. (2021) “Social Inferences from Animations in Agenesis of the Corpus Callosum and Autism: Semantic Analysis and Topic Modeling” Journal of Autism and Developmental Disorders.
- Brown, W.S., Panos, A. and Paul, L.K. (2020) “Attention, Impulsivity, and Vigilance in Agenesis of the Corpus Callosum” Neuropsychology. doi: 10.1037/neu0000685.
- Brown, W.S. and Paul, L.K. (2019) “The Neuropsychological Syndrome of Agenesis of the Corpus Callosum” Journal of the International Neuropsychological Society. 25:324-330. doi:10.1017/S135561771800111X
- Young C. M., Folsom, R. C., Paul, L.K., Su, Judy, Mangum, R. and Brown, W.S. (2019) “Social Cognition in Agenesis of the Corpus Callosum: Computational Linguistic Analysis of the Awareness of Consequences Scale”, Neuropsychology. Vol 33:2 doi:10.1037/neu0000512

== Awards and honors ==
Awards

- C. Davis Weyerhaeuser Teaching Excellence Award by The Stewardship Foundation (1992)
- Point Loma Nazarene University Outstanding Alumnus Award (1988)
- National Science Foundation U.S.-Industrialized Countries Exchange of Scientists and Engineers (1986)
- Research Scientist Development Award, Type I by the NIMH (1975–1980)

Honors

- Fellow (Note: "Fellow status is an honor bestowed upon APA members who have shown evidence of unusual and outstanding contributions or performance in the field of psychology.") of Division 40 and Division 6 of the American Psychological Association
