= Philip Clayton (philosopher) =

American Christian philosopher

Philip Clayton (born 1956) is an American philosopher of religion and philosopher of science. His work focuses on the intersection of science, ethics, and society. He currently holds the Ingraham Chair at Claremont School of Theology and serves as an affiliated faculty member at Claremont Graduate University. Clayton specializes in the philosophy of science, philosophy of biology, and philosophy of religion, as well as in comparative theology.

== Career ==
As an administrator in higher education, Clayton served as Dean of the Claremont School of Theology, and as Provost and Senior Vice President of Claremont Lincoln University, which at that time was an interreligious university. He was Principal Investigator for the Science and the Spiritual Quest project from 1999 to 2003.

Within the natural sciences, Clayton's research has focused on emergent dynamics in biology and on the neural correlates of consciousness in neuroscience. He has co-authored or edited a number of publications with physicists, chemists, and biologists, analyzing emerging natural systems and exploring their significance for the study of religion. He works in particular on the philosophical and religious implications of emergence theory. In this field his books include Mind and Emergence: From Quantum to Consciousness and In Quest of Freedom:The Emergence of Spirit in the Natural World. He was also editor of The Reemergence of Emergence. He has also published extensively in the field of science and religion, and served as the co-editor for The Oxford Handbook of Religion and Science.

Clayton received a joint PhD from Yale University in the philosophy of science and the philosophy of religion. He has also held a variety of invited guest professorships at other universities, including LMU Munich, the University of Cambridge, and Harvard University. As Fulbright Senior Fellow and Humboldt Professor, he studied with Wolfhart Pannenberg in Theology and in Philosophy with Dieter Henrich and Lorenz Puntel. He later co-edited the English Festschrift for Pannenberg and translated Pannenberg's work into English.

Philip Clayton has taught at Haverford College, Williams College, and Sonoma State University. His international lectureships include India, Great Britain, France, and China. He speaks and writes extensively on issues at the intersection of science, religion, ethics, and politics.

== Authored works ==
- Explanation from Physics to Theology, New Haven: Yale University Press, 1989.
- God and Contemporary Science, Grand Rapids: Wm. B. Eerdman's, 1998.
- The Problem of God in Modern Thought, Grand Rapids: Wm. B. Eerdman's, 2000.
- Mind and Emergence: From Quantum to Consciousness, Oxford University Press, 2004.
- In Quest of Freedom: The Emergence of Spirit in the Natural World, Göttingen: Vandenhoeck and Ruprecht, 2007 (English edition 2009).
- Adventures in the Spirit: God, World, and Divine Action, Minneapolis: Fortress Press, 2008.
- Transforming Christian Theology: For Church and Society, Minneapolis: Fortress Press, 2009.
- The Predicament of Belief: Science, Philosophy, and Christian Minimalism, Oxford University Press, 2011.

== Selected edited works ==
- Science and the Spiritual Quest: New Essays by Leading Scientists, London and New York: Routledge, 2002.
- In Whom We Live and Move and Have our Being: Panentheistic Reflections on God's Presence in a Scientific World (with Arthur Peacocke), Eerdman's, 2004.
- Evolution and Ethics (with Jeff Schloss), Eerdman's 2004.
- The Re-Emergence of Emergence: The Emergentist Hypothesis from Science to Religion (with Paul Davies), Oxford University Press, 2006.
- The Oxford Handbook of Religion and Science (with Zachary Simpson), Oxford University Press, 2006.
- Practicing Science, Living Faith: Interviews with Twelve Leading Scientists (with Jim Schaal), New York: Columbia University Press, 2007.
- Panentheism across the World's Traditions (with Loriliai Biernacki), Oxford University Press, 2014.
