= Adina L. Roskies =

American philosopher

Education
- Education: Yale University (BA, MSL); University of California, San Diego (MA, MS, PhD); Massachusetts Institute of Technology (PhD)

Philosophical work
- Era: 21st-century philosophy
- Region: Western philosophy
- Institutions: Dartmouth College
- Main interests: neuroethics

Adina L. Roskies is an American philosopher. In 1995, she graduated from the University of California, San Diego, it was at UCSD that she earned a Ph.D in Neuroscience and cognitive science. She became a Professor of Philosophy at the University of California, Santa Barbara in January 2024; Previously she had taught at Dartmouth College beginning in 2004, serving as the Helman Family Distinguished Professor from 2017 to 2023. She is known for her works on neuroethics, neuroscience of free will and epiphenomenalism. Roskies was Senior Editor of the journal Neuron.

== Books ==
- A Primer on Criminal Law and Neuroscience, edited with Stephen J. Morse, Oxford University Press 2013

== Awards ==
- William James Prize, awarded by the Society of Philosophy and Psychology
- Stanton Prize, awarded by the Society of Philosophy and Psychology
- Neuroethics Prize, awarded by the Italian Society of Neuroethics
