= Robin Le Poidevin =

Emeritus Professor of Metaphysics (born 1962)

Robin Le Poidevin (born 1962) is a British philosopher who is Emeritus Professor of Metaphysics at the University of Leeds, whose special interests include agnosticism, philosophy of religion, metaphysics, and philosophy of space and time.

== Biography ==
Le Poidevin was educated at Repton School and Oriel College Oxford, where he graduated with a B.A. (1984, converted to M.A., 1988) in Psychology and Philosophy. He took a Ph.D. in Philosophy at Emmanuel College, Cambridge (1989) supervised by Hugh Mellor. He was Gifford Research Fellow in Logic and Metaphysics at the University of St Andrews, 1988-89. He was appointed to a lectureship in Philosophy at the University of Leeds in 1989, where he taught until 2022. He was the 2007 Stanton Lecturer in Philosophy of Religion at the University of Cambridge and the 2012 Alan Richardson Fellow in Theology at the University of Durham. From 2010 to 2015 he was Editor of Religious Studies, and is a past President of the British Society for the Philosophy of Religion.

Le Poidevin has defended both agnosticism and religious fictionalism in his writings on religion, and the B-theory of time (which denies the reality of temporal passage) in his writings on metaphysics.

In 2025 he was approved for award of the degree of Doctor of Letters (Litt.D.) by the University of Cambridge.

== Publications ==
=== Books ===
- Change, Cause and Contradiction: A Defence of the Tenseless Theory of Time, London: Macmillan, 1991. ISBN 978-0333542866
- Arguing for Atheism: An Introduction to the Philosophy of Religion, London: Routledge, 1996. ISBN 978-0415093385
- Travels in Four Dimensions: The Enigmas of Space and Time, Oxford: Oxford University Press, 2003. ISBN 978-0198752554
- The Images of Time: An Essay on Temporal Representation, Oxford: Oxford University Press, 2007. ISBN 978-0199575510
- Agnosticism: A Very Short Introduction, Oxford: Oxford University Press, 2010. ISBN 978-0199575268
- Religious Fictionalism, Cambridge: Cambridge University Press, 2019. ISBN 978-1108558198
- And Was Made Man: Mind, Metaphysics and Incarnation, Oxford: Oxford University Press, 2023. ISBN 978-0199676576

=== Edited volumes ===
- The Philosophy of Time (co-edited with Murray MacBeath), Oxford: Oxford University Press, 1993. ISBN 9780198239994
- Questions of Time and Tense, Oxford: Oxford University Press, 1998. ISBN 9780199250462
- Being: Developments in Contemporary Metaphysics, Cambridge: Cambridge University Press, 2006. ISBN 9780521735445
- The Routledge Companion to Metaphysics (co-edited with Peter Simons, Ross Cameron and Andrew McGonigal, London: Routledge, 2009. ISBN 9780415396318

=== Essays (selected) ===
- The Experience and Perception of Time (Stanford Encyclopedia of Philosophy)
- ‘Why I am Agnostic’, in Mark Lamport, ed, The Rowman and Littlefield Handbook of Philosophy and Religion, Lanham: Rowman and Littlefield, 2022.
- For a fuller list, see:
  - Robin Le Poidevin (University of Leeds) - PhilPeople
  - Robin Le Poidevin - Google Scholar
