= Paul R. Abramson (psychologist) =

American psychologist

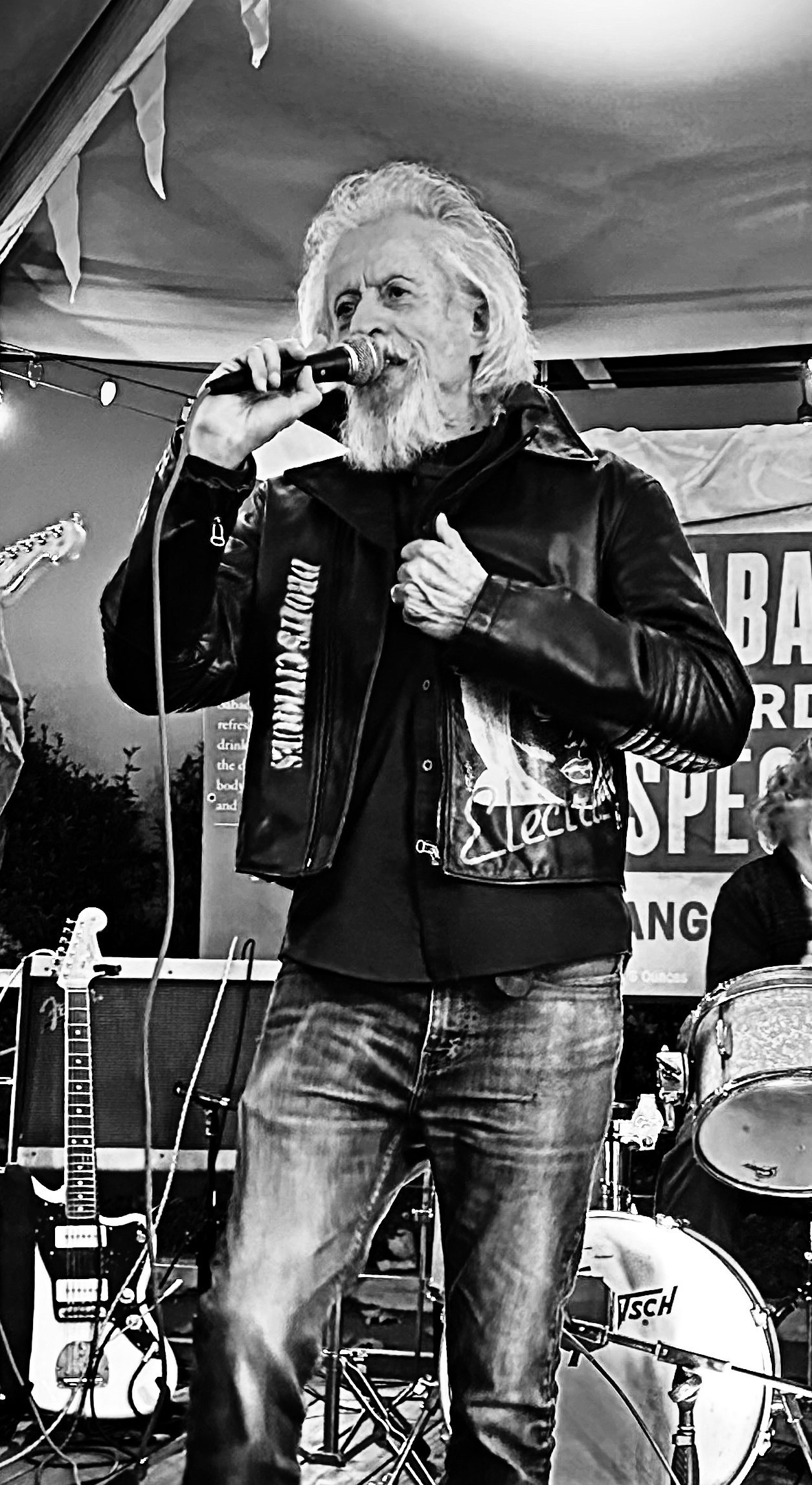
- Abramson performing with his band, Crying 4 Kafka (2026)
- Born: December 24, 1949 (age 76); Norwalk, Connecticut, US
- Spouse: Tania L. Abramson
- Children: 2

Academic background
- Education: University of Miami (BA); Connecticut College (MA); University of Connecticut (PhD)
- Doctoral advisor: Donald L. Mosher

Academic work
- Discipline: Psychology
- Sub-discipline: Human sexuality
- Institutions: UCLA (1976-present)

Paul Richard Abramson (born December 24, 1949 in Norwalk, Connecticut) is an American researcher in human sexuality whose work has covered topics such as the origins of pleasure, as well as the connection between psychological variables, such as guilt, and human sexual functioning. The constitutional foundation of sexual rights has also been a centerpiece of his writing about civil liberties in the United States. He often works at the intersection of human sexuality and psychological trauma, such as in extreme cases of child sexual abuse. However, he has occasionally participated in cases involving other forms of major trauma, such as the 2008 Chatsworth train collision.

== Biography ==
Abramson was born in Norwalk, Connecticut in 1949, the oldest son of Leonard Abramson and Ethel Esther Sakowitz. He received a bachelor's degree in psychology in 1971 from the University of Miami, a master's degree in psychology in 1973 from Connecticut College, and a PhD in psychology in 1976 from the University of Connecticut. His doctoral advisor was Donald L. Mosher.

Abramson employs methods such as mathematical models, narrative depictions, constitutional scholarship, archival research, epidemiology, psychological interviews, ethnography, and the philosophy of aesthetics to conduct his research. In the 1990s, he and his colleagues developed various mathematical models of HIV infection and harm reduction, stressing the importance of condoms, particularly due to the series of challenges to the funding priorities underlying the HIV vaccine. He later served as a Technical Advisor to the World Health Organization's Global Program on AIDS. His 1984 book Sarah: A Sexual Biography was one of the first in-depth psychological portrayals of the lasting effects of childhood sexual abuse on its victims. In 2000, he and his student Steven Pinkerton published A House Divided: Suspicions of mother-daughter incest, which deals with similar subject matter. In 2021, Abramson and his daughter Sienna co-wrote a paper in the Wrongful Conviction Law Review about the lasting psychological effects of wrongful imprisonment, specifically in the case of Maurice Caldwell, who was imprisoned at New Folsom for 21 years.

In his research, he has also examined the Ninth Amendment to the United States Constitution. His 2003 book Sexual Rights in America: The ninth amendment and the pursuit of happiness argues that the freedom to choose how, when and with whom to express sexuality is a quintessential right protected by the Ninth Amendment. In 2022, he published the article "It’s all about the Jimmy Hats: Rethinking the constitutional defense of reproductive rights after Dobbs via the Ninth Amendment" in Reason.

Abramson has been a professor of psychology at UCLA since July 1, 1976 and has taught courses including Introduction to Psychology, Personality, Personality Assessment, Sex and the Law, and Human Sexuality. He has co-taught the courses Art & Trauma and Feminism, Art & the Metaphors of Trauma since 2018. In 2023, he was the recipient of the university's Eugen Weber Honors Collegium Teaching Award. In addition to his teaching duties, he has also supervised several doctoral dissertations and undergraduate honors projects.

== Personal life ==
Abramson is also a musician and graphic artist. His artwork appears in the "Queen of Hearts in a Cage" music video by his band, Crying 4 Kafka, as well as in the book The Sanctity of Rhyme: The metaphysics of Crying 4 Kafka in prose and verse by Erika Blair. He wrote the musical The Saint of Fucked Up Karma, which opened in 2013 at Santa Barbara's Center Stage Theater. Abramson composed the music with Robin Finck of Nine Inch Nails.

Abramson is married to the multidisciplinary artist Tania L. Abramson, a lecturer at both UCLA and UCSB. He has two children, one of whom is Sienna Bland-Abramson, co-author of several of Abramson's psychology papers.

== Selected publications ==
=== Books ===
- 1980: Personality: The Heuristic Perspective. New York: Holt, Rinehart & Winston.
- 1983: Bias in Psychotherapy. New York: Praeger. With J. Murray (eds.). ISBN 978-0030632266
- 1984: Sarah: A Sexual Biography. Albany, N.Y.: State University of New York Press. With S. D. Pinkerton. ISBN 978-0873958639
- 1991: A Case for Case Studies: An Immigrant's Journal. California: Sage Publications, Inc. ISBN 978-0803936959
- 1995: Sexual Nature/Sexual Culture. Chicago: University of Chicago Press. With S. D. Pinkerton (eds.). ISBN 978-0226001821
- 1995: With Pleasure: Thoughts on the Nature of Human Sexuality. New York: Oxford University Press. With S. D. Pinkerton. ISBN 978-0195146097
- 2000. A House Divided: Suspicions of Mother-Daughter Incest. New York: W.W. Norton. With S. D. Pinkerton. ISBN 978-0393976359
- 2003: Sexual Rights in America: The Ninth Amendment and the Pursuit of Happiness. New York: NYU Press. With S. D. Pinkerton and M. Huppin. ISBN 978-0814706923
- 2007: Romance in the Ivory Tower: The Rights and Liberties of Conscience. Cambridge, MA: MIT Press. ISBN 978-0262012379
- 2010: Sex Appeal: Six Ethical Principles for the 21st Century. New York: Oxford University Press. ISBN 978-0199742080
- 2017: Screwing Around with Sex: Essays, Indictments, Anecdotes, and Asides. Joshua Tree, CA.: Asylum 4 Renegades Press. ISBN 978-0199742080

=== Peer-reviewed articles ===
- 1981: "Negative attitudes toward masturbation and pelvic vasocongestion: A thermographic analysis" in Journal of Research in Personality, 15(4):497-509. With L. B. Perry, A. Rothblatt, T. Talbot Seeley, and D. M. Seeley. doi:10.1016/0092-6566(81)90046-5
- 1997: "Effectiveness of condoms in preventing HIV transmission" in Social Science & Medicine, 44(9):1303–1312. With S. D. Pinkerton. doi:10.1016/s0277-9536(96)00258-4
- 2019: "David Wojnarowicz and the surge of nuances: Modifying aesthetic judgement with the influx of knowledge" in Aesthetic Investigations, 3(1):146-157. With T. L. Abramson. doi:10.58519/aesthinv.v3i1.11959.
- 2021: "Hiding under the color of authority" in Journal of Child Sexual Abuse, 31(3): pp. 353–372. With S. Bland-Abramson. doi:10.1080/10538712.2021.2014613.
- 2021: "Racial animus, police corruption, and a wrongful conviction of murder" in The Wrongful Conviction Law Review, 2(2). With S. Bland-Abramson. doi:10.29173/wclawr55.

=== News articles ===
- 2003, June 18: "No More Amour With UC Faculty?", LA Times.
- 2007, September 30: "The Right to Romance", The Boston Globe.
- 2011, January 27: "Give Sodomy A Chance". With L. J. Williamson. LA Weekly.
- 2012, February 9: "Condoms Suck." With L. J. Williamson. LA Weekly.
- 2012, March 15: "Condoms Still Suck, No Matter What Joycelyn Elders Thinks (She's on Trojan's Payroll)." With L. J. Williamson. LA Weekly.
- 2012, April 19: "Blackjack With Pedophiles: Why Gambling on Our Ability to Stop Sex Offenders Isn't the Way to Go." With L. J. Williamson. LA Weekly.
- 2014, November 23: "Op-Ed: Waiting Until College to Teach About Affirmative Consent is Too Late." With L. Dautch. LA Times.
