= Society for the Study of Theology =

The Society for the Study of Theology (SST) is the leading British organization for theologians in academy, church, and society, which held its first conference in 1952.

== Mission ==
The Society is the leading scholarly society for the study of theology in the UK. The Society for the Study of Theology promotes excellence in the study of Christian Theology by facilitating and shaping theological thought, conversation, and community. In particular, the Society's object is to identify and discuss important themes, questions and dialogues which call for theological engagement.

== Conference ==
The Society holds an annual conference. Its first was held in Cambridge in 1952 on the theme of "eschatology".

== Presidents ==
- Very Revd Dr John Baillie (1952–54)
- Very Revd W.R. Matthews (1955–56)
- Prof J.H.S. Burleigh (1957–58)
- Revd Principal F. Greeves (1959–60)
- Prof Alan Richardson (1961–62)
- Very Revd Mgr H. Francis Davis (1963–64)
- Prof H.D. Lewis (1965–66)
- Revd Prof T.F. Torrance (1967–68)
- Rt Revd Dr I.T. Ramsey (1969–70)
- Revd Prof H. Cunliffe Jones (1971–72)
- Revd Canon Prof M.F. Wiles (1973–74)
- Revd Prof John Hick (1975–76)
- Revd Prof Allan Galloway (1977–78)
- Revd Prof James Atkinson (1979–80)
- Prof D.M. MacKinnon (1981–82)
- Revd Principal James Whyte (1983–84)
- Prof Stewart R. Sutherland (1985–86)
- Revd Canon Prof Daniel Hardy (1987–88)
- Canon Brian Hebblethwaite (1989–90)
- Prof Duncan Forrester (1991–92)
- Prof Colin Gunton (1993–94)
- Prof Vincent Brümmer (1995–96)
- Prof David Ford (1997–98)
- Prof Anthony Thiselton (1999–2000)
- Revd Prof David Fergusson (2001–2)
- Rt Revd Peter Selby (2003–4)
- Prof Ann Loades (2005–6)
- Prof Oliver Davies (2007–8)
- Dr Janet Soskice (2009–10)
- Prof Graham Ward (2011–12)
- Revd Prof George Newlands (2013–14)
- Revd Prof David Brown (2015–16)
- Prof Karen Kilby (2017–18)
- Prof Rachel Muers (2019–20)
- Prof Mike Higton (2020–22)
- Prof David Clough (2022–24)
- Prof Robert Beckford (2024–26)
- Prof Susanna Cornwall (2026–28)
