= Is There a God? =

1996 book by Richard Swinburne

- First edition cover 1996 (Jacket)
- Author: Richard Swinburne
- Language: English
- Subject: the existence of God, philosophy of religion, theology, rational theism
- Genre: treatise
- Publisher: Oxford University Press
- Publication place: United Kingdom
- English publication date: First edition: 1996; Revised edition: 7 January 2010
- Pages: 129
- ISBN: 978-0-19-958043-9

Is There a God? is a 1996 book by British philosopher of religion Richard Swinburne, claiming the existence of the Abrahamic God. The argument rests on an updated version of natural theology with biological evolution and Big Bang theory using scientific inference. In 2010, a revised version of the original book was released under the same title.

The extensive use of probability theory, such as Bayes' theorem, and of inductive logic, as in Swinburne's more elaborate book The Existence of God, is omitted in Is There a God?, but a discussion of the concepts of the multiple universes and cosmological inflation is added to the 2010 edition. Swinburne concludes that it is probable that a God exists. His arguments are the existence, orderliness and fine-tuning of the universe, the existence of conscious higher vertebrate animals, and humans with their skills, the historical evidence of miracles, especially the resurrection of Jesus, and the religious experience of millions.

== Synopsis ==
=== Introduction to the revised edition ===
Swinburne discusses objections by theologians to his concept of God compared to the traditional Christian God, whether God is supposed to be totally incomprehensible or not. The Trinity is explained elsewhere. Swinburne compares the wave–particle duality of electrons in physics to the interpretation of God either as a person or as an impersonal power.

=== Chapter 1: God ===
Swinburne defines theism as the claim that there is a God, as generally understood by "Western religion" (Christianity, Judaism, and Islam). It entails that this God is a personal being, an individual who can act intentionally and has purposes and beliefs. He possesses the essential properties of being everlastingly omnipotent, omniscient and perfectly free. However, God cannot do what is logically impossible and so cannot know what a human will freely do in the future. This is a departure from the standard Jewish, Christian or Islamic view. Swinburne assumes that humans have some limited free will by a choice of God, and are not fully determined by their brain states or by God. From the properties of omnipotence, omniscience and perfect freedom it follows that God is independent of matter and therefore bodiless. Furthermore, he is omnipresent and the creator and sustainer of the universe, perfectly good, and a source of moral obligation. According to theism, God is responsible for the properties of inanimate things. Swinburne posits that there are moral truths independent of God's will and sides here with Thomas Aquinas and Duns Scotus.

There exist two kinds of good actions: duties and supererogatory good actions, the latter are beyond obligation. Swinburne posits, that it is logically impossible for the omnipotent God to do all possible good acts. Theism maintains that God is the ultimate brute fact which explains everything else, except the existence of God itself.

=== Chapter 2: How We Explain Things ===
Swinburne defines a substance as an individual thing, with properties and relations with other things or substances. Events are phenomena caused by substances. Events have two kinds of explanations, inanimate and intentional personal explanations. Science provides inanimate explanations, generalized in laws of nature or scientific laws.

Laws of nature are human summaries, not substances by themselves. Swinburne cites the quantitative explanation of the orbit and the position of the planet Jupiter by Newton's laws for motion and gravitation and "Einstein's laws", by which he means General relativity. If a natural law provides a full explanation, an event must occur deterministically, but a law can also give a partial explanation, in terms of probabilities, such as for radioactive decay processes.

According to Swinburne, laws of nature are justified by four criteria, namely 1. a law leads us to accurately expect many and varied events we do in fact observe, 2. is simple, 3. fits in with background knowledge, and 4. does not have a rival law which works better or just as good. Criterion 2 is related to the principle of Occam's razor. Falsifiability is not mentioned. Swinburne claims that just as we may need to postulate "unobservable" planets, such as Neptune by Le Verrier in 1846, and atoms to explain phenomena, we may need to postulate non-embodied persons, such as a God, to better explain the phenomena applying the four criteria above.

=== Chapter 3: The Simplicity of God ===
Three possible kinds of ultimate explanations are listed: 1. Materialism means that all factors in personal explanation have a complete inanimate explanation. The personal and the mental are fully caused by the physical. Everything harks back to a first beginningless state. 2. Mixed theories such as humanism. Here factors in both personal and inanimate explanation do not all have an ultimate inanimate explanation, as in materialism. 3. Theories in which factors in inanimate explanation are themselves explained in personal terms, including God. So theism is a theory of this kind. Swinburne claims that God provides a complete explanation of the universe and everything that happens in it, except in so far as he permits humans to make free choices. God is then the ultimate explanation of the universe.

According to Swinburne, materialism fails to explain many phenomena and humanism is an even less simple hypothesis. He believes that theism provides the simplest and therefore the best explanation: everything is caused and kept in existence by one substance, God. Simplicity of a theory requires that the assumed properties are null or infinite. God is the latter, claims Swinburne.

=== Chapter 4: How the Existence of God Explains the World and its Order ===
It is assumed that the most natural state of the universe would be nothing, so there also would be no God. Swinburne thinks it is extraordinary that there should exist anything at all. According to him, science cannot explain the orderly world we experience. Furthermore, Swinburne assumes that a world containing humans is a good thing. It is stated that the consciousness of higher animals and humans, and the beauty in the order of the universe were reasons for God to create this universe out of his goodness.

Swinburne agrees with the book Natural Theology (1809) by William Paley but also subscribes to the theory of Darwinian evolution as expounded by Richard Dawkins and fine-tuning of the constants in the equations for the four fundamental forces in physics, as discussed by Paul Davies. According to Swinburne, the assumption of a God is far simpler than that of a multiverse, and explains the very success of science.

=== Chapter 5: How the Existence of God Explains the Existence of Humans ===
It is stated that humans and the higher animals are conscious beings, with immaterial souls that were connected to their bodies at some time in evolutionary history. The explanation is beyond science, but Swinburne believes that God can provide a probable explanation. God is an immaterial substance which is partly working through natural laws such as evolution.

=== Chapter 6: Why God Allows Evil ===
This chapter sets out to explain that God cannot give us goods in full measure without allowing much evil on the way, such as natural disasters and accidents, but also moral evils. According to Swinburne's theodicy, the free will and the heroic choice between good and evil that God allows humans, is the cause of moral evils. For a human, being allowed to suffer to make possible a great good is a privilege, so that others have the opportunity to react in the right way. Likewise for animals suffering gives their lives value and involves good intentional actions such as rescuing. A perfectly good God would be justified in bringing about evils for the sake of the good they make possible.

=== Chapter 7: How the Existence of God Explains Miracles and Religious Experience ===
Swinburne states that if God intervened regularly in the natural order, humans would lose control. But like loving parents, God may break rules sometimes. If a perfectly good God exists, then He might, for instance, answer prayers to cure cancer, but this would remove the incentive for humans to look for solutions. Divine intervention might occur using natural laws, or by miracles, when natural laws are temporarily suspended or violated.

Historical reports of miracles should be judged by applying our historical and scientific knowledge, to determine whether God may have had a reason to intervene. Two principles are stated: 1. The principle of credulity - we ought to believe things we experience for what they seem to us in an epistemic sense until there is contrary evidence - and 2. The principle of testimony - we ought to believe something unless there likewise is contrary evidence. There are three types of mistaken evidence: 1. the conditions of the observation were unreliable, 2. background knowledge precludes the probability of the event, and 3. the cause of the event could be a different one than assumed.

However, Swinburne states that God sustains all religious experiences and that such claims can only be defeated by a strong balance of evidence that there is no God. Swinburne considers the Christian founding miracle of the resurrection of Jesus to be evidence for the existence of God, provided that the historical evidence and some plausibility of the Christian teachings are accepted.

=== Epilogue: So What? ===
Swinburne muses over possible objections to his arguments, and states that discussions and experiments always continue, for instance in science to test quantum theory. As life is short, we have to act on the basis of available probable evidence, according to Swinburne. He concludes that the significant balance of probability indicates there is a God.

== Reception ==
David Hall reviewed this book in 1996 for the magazine Philosophy Now. He noted that since his 1977 book The Coherence of Theism Swinburne's attempt of proving God did not change tack, despite criticism by J.L. Mackie (The Miracle of Theism, 1982), A. O’Hear (Experience, Explanation and Faith, 1984), K.M. Parsons (God and the Burden of Proof, 1989) and M. Martin (Atheism: A Philosophical Justification, 1990). Hall attacks the book on philosophical, theological and moral grounds, and concludes "This book is further evidence that intelligence and academic ability are no guarantee of sound judgement in religion, as the number of fundamentalists with degrees in the sciences well illustrates. The reasons people give for their beliefs are always after the fact of belief itself, which comes upon them in ways they hardly know."

In 1998 Laura L. Garcia, a philosopher at Rutger's University, summarised Swinburne's argument in the journal on religion First Things as a revival of natural theology. She found it "refreshing to find a philosopher of Swinburne’s ability and erudition writing such a robust apologetic with no apologies."

Philosopher Keith Burgess-Jackson (University of Texas at Arlington) discussed Swinburne's hypothesis in 1999 in the journal Metaphilosophy. He finds fault with Swinburne for his assumption that science could accept supernatural explanations. Furthermore, Swinburne is criticized for his emphasis on simplicity, postulating that an infinite being (God) should be more simple than a finite one, and then appealing to Occam's Razor. Anyway, at best Swinburne could have proven the existence of at least one very powerful (and not necessarily good) superhuman, still a far cry from the Christian god. "Swinburne greedily [insists] (in Dennett's sense) ... that it is irrational for a scientist - someone committed to the scientific method - to be an atheist. This is not just false, and not just contrary to Swinburne's own advice from another context, it is, as I said at the outset, unfriendly."

Dutch philosopher Herman Philipse (Utrecht University) debated Swinburne in front of an academic audience at Amsterdam in 2017. He praised Swinburne for attempting a scientific approach to the probability of God's existence, at variance with Dutch theologians who refused rational arguments. A large number of points were raised, for instance Philipse claimed that a religious explanation for the universe presupposes a finite history. A class of cyclical "bouncing universe" theories, which could be tested, features an infinite history of the universe. According to Philipse's 2012 book God in the Age of Science? attributing mental properties to a being requires observing its bodily behaviour, so God could not be bodiless. Swinburne replied that universe itself can be viewed as God's body. According to Philipse, a hypothesis is tested scientifically not only for simplicity, but also for accordance with extensive background knowledge. Furthermore, Bayesian statistics cannot be applied if God is unfathomable.

Biblical scholar Josaphat C. Tam (Evangel Seminary, Hong Kong, with a PhD from the University of Edinburgh) concluded in The Expository Times in 2013 that Swinburne had made a good case for the existence of God with exceptional clarity.
