= The Existence of God (book) =

1979 book by Richard Swinburne

- Second edition cover 2004 (Hardcover)
- Author: Richard Swinburne
- Language: English
- Subject: the existence of God, philosophy of religion, theology, rational theism
- Genre: treatise
- Publisher: first edition Oxford University Press, second edition Clarendon Press
- Publication place: United Kingdom
- English publication date: First edition: 1979; Reissued with appendices: 1991; Second edition: 2004
- Pages: viii + 363
- ISBN: 0-19-927167-4

The Existence of God is a 1979 book by British philosopher of religion Richard Swinburne, arguing for the existence of the Abrahamic God on rational grounds. The argument rests on an updated version of natural theology with biological evolution using scientific inference, mathematical probability theory, such as Bayes' theorem, and of inductive logic. In 2004, a second edition was released under the same title.

Swinburne discusses the intrinsic probability of theism, with an everlastingly omnipotent, omniscient and perfectly free (Note: Swinburne defines God as perfectly "free" because his actions are claimed to be determined only by his uncaused choice at the moment of choice. No object, event or state—including his own previous states—causally influences what God does, according to Swinburne.) God. He states various reasons for the existence of God, such as cosmological and teleological arguments, arguments from the consciousness of the higher vertebrates including humans, morality, providence, history, miracles and religious experience. Swinburne claims that the occurrence of evil does not diminish the probability of God, and that the hiddenness of God can be explained by his allowing free choice to humans. He concludes that on balance it is more probable than not that God exists, with a probability larger than 0.5, on a scale of 0.0 (impossible) to 1.0 (absolutely sure).

Swinburne summarised the same argument in his later and shorter book Is There a God?, omitting the use of Bayes' theorem and inductive logic, but including a discussion of multiple universes and cosmological inflation in the 2010 edition.

== Arguments in inductive logic ==
Central to the argument of Swinburne is the use of inductive logic. He defines a correct C-inductive argument as an argument where the premisses merely add to the probability of the conclusion, and a stronger correct P-inductive argument when the premisses make the conclusion probable with a probability larger than 1/2.

== Probability of God according to theism using Bayes' theorem ==
Swinburne applies mathematical conditional probability logic to various hypotheses related to the existence of God and defines

$e$ as the available evidence,
$h$ as the hypothesis to be tested, and
$k$ as the so-called "tautological" background knowledge.

The notation $P(e|k)$ is used for the conditional probability of an event $e$ occurring given that another event $k$ occurred previously. This is also termed the posterior probability of $e$ given $k$.

The probability of the present evidence $e$ given background knowledge $k$ can be written as the sum of the evidence with God existing ($e \& h$, e and h) and the evidence without God ($e \& \sim h$, e and not h):

$P(e|k) = P(e \& h|k) + P(e \& \sim h|k)$, with $P(e \& h|k) = P(h|k) P(e|h \& k)$, and $P(e \& \sim h|k) = P(e| \sim h\&k) P(\sim h|k)$.

Application of Bayes' theorem to $P(h|e \& k)$, the probability of the God hypothesis $h$ given evidence $e$ and background knowledge $k$, results in

$$P(h|e \& k) = \frac{ P(e|h \& k) P(h|k) }{ P(e|h \& k)P(h|k) + P(e|\sim h \& k) P(\sim h|k) }\cdot$$

The probability of a universe of our kind, as evidenced by $e$ without a single omnipotent god ($\sim h$) $P(e| \sim h \& k) P(\sim h|k)$ can be written as the sum of the probabilities of several optional hypotheses $h_i$ without a god, i = 1, 2, 3:

- $h_1$: There exist many gods or limited, non-omnipotent gods
- $h_2$: There are no gods but there is an initial or everlasting state of a kind to bring the present state of the universe about
- $h_3$: There is no explanation at all needed, with the universe always being as it is now.

The sum of probabilities becomes $P(e| \sim h \& k) P(\sim h|k) = P(e| h1 \& k) P(h_1|k) + .. + P(e|h_3 \& k) P(h_3|k)$

Swinburne then claims to refute these three hypotheses:

- $h_1$ because theism should be simpler than many gods or gods of limited power. So theism has a much larger probability: $P(e|h \& k) P(h|k) >> P(e|h_1 \& k) P(h_1|k)$
- $h_2$ fails, because Swinburne believes an unextended physical point or any other starting points of universe, or an everlasting state are unlikely to produce the features of the universe. Theism is more probable, so either $P(e|h_2 \& k) < P(e|h \& k)$ or $P(h_2|k) < P(h|k).$
- $h_3$ is refuted as well, because according to Swinburne, there is the "...overwhelming fact that each particle of matter throughout vast volumes of space should behave in exactly the same way as every other particle codified in laws of nature without there being some explanation of this is beyond belief."

Admittedly this hypothesis $h_3$ can explain the present state of affairs in the universe - the evidence $e$ - without the need of a God, that means the probability is 1.0: $P(e|h_3 \& k) = 1$.

However, Swinburne estimates that the probability $P(h_3|k)$ given the background knowledge is infinitesimally low.

Then the sum of probabilities of the various hypotheses without God

$P(e|h_1 \& k) P(h_1|k) + .. + P(e|h_3 \& k) P(h_3|k) = P(e| \sim h \& k) P(\sim h|k)$ will not exceed
$$P(e|h \& k)P(h|k)$$.

So $P(h|e \& k)$, the posterior probability of theism or God $h$ on the evidence $e$ considered with background knowledge $k$, will be 1/2 or more, by a "correct P-inductive argument". Swinburne states that it is impossible to give exact numerical values for the probabilities used.

Swinburne concludes that deductive proofs of God fail, but claims that on the basis of the above P-inductive argument, theism is probably true. He notes that in his calculation the evidence from religious experience and historical evidence of life, death and resurrection of Jesus were ignored: its addition would be sufficient to make theism overall probable with a probability larger than 1/2.

== Reception ==
In 2005 Joshua Golding reviewed The Existence of God and noted that the lack of justification for the afterlife leads to skepticism about whether God exists due to the problem of evil. The principle of credulity cannot be relied on without caution. Golding would prefer a priori proof that God exists, a better inductive argument for God's existence, or an argument assuming for practical purposes, that God exists.

In 2009 Jeremy Gwiazda, a philosopher at The City University of New York argued that Swinburne did not prove his starting point that God is simple and thus likely to exist. The arguments from mathematical simplicity and scientists' preferences both fail.

Gabe Czobel analysed Swinburne's arguments including his use of Bayesian statistics and pointed out errors in reasoning. Even if Swinburne's logic were right, a theist could not derive much consolation from it.

Dutch philosopher Herman Philipse (Utrecht University) debated Swinburne in front of an academic audience at Amsterdam in 2017. He praised Swinburne for attempting a scientific approach to the probability of God's existence, at variance with Dutch theologians who refused rational arguments. A large number of points were raised, for instance Philipse claimed that a religious explanation for the universe presupposes a finite history. A class of cyclical "bouncing universe" theories, which could be tested, features an infinite history of the universe. According to Philipse's 2012 book God in the Age of Science? attributing mental properties to a being requires observing its bodily behaviour, so God could not be bodiless. Swinburne replied that universe itself can be viewed as God's body. According to Philipse, a hypothesis is tested scientifically not only for simplicity, but also for accordance with extensive background knowledge. Furthermore, Bayesian statistics cannot be applied if God is unfathomable.
