= David Clough =

David Clough may refer to:

- David Marston Clough (1846–1924), American politician
- David L. Clough (born 1968), British author and academic
