= David L. Clough =

English author and academic (born 1968)

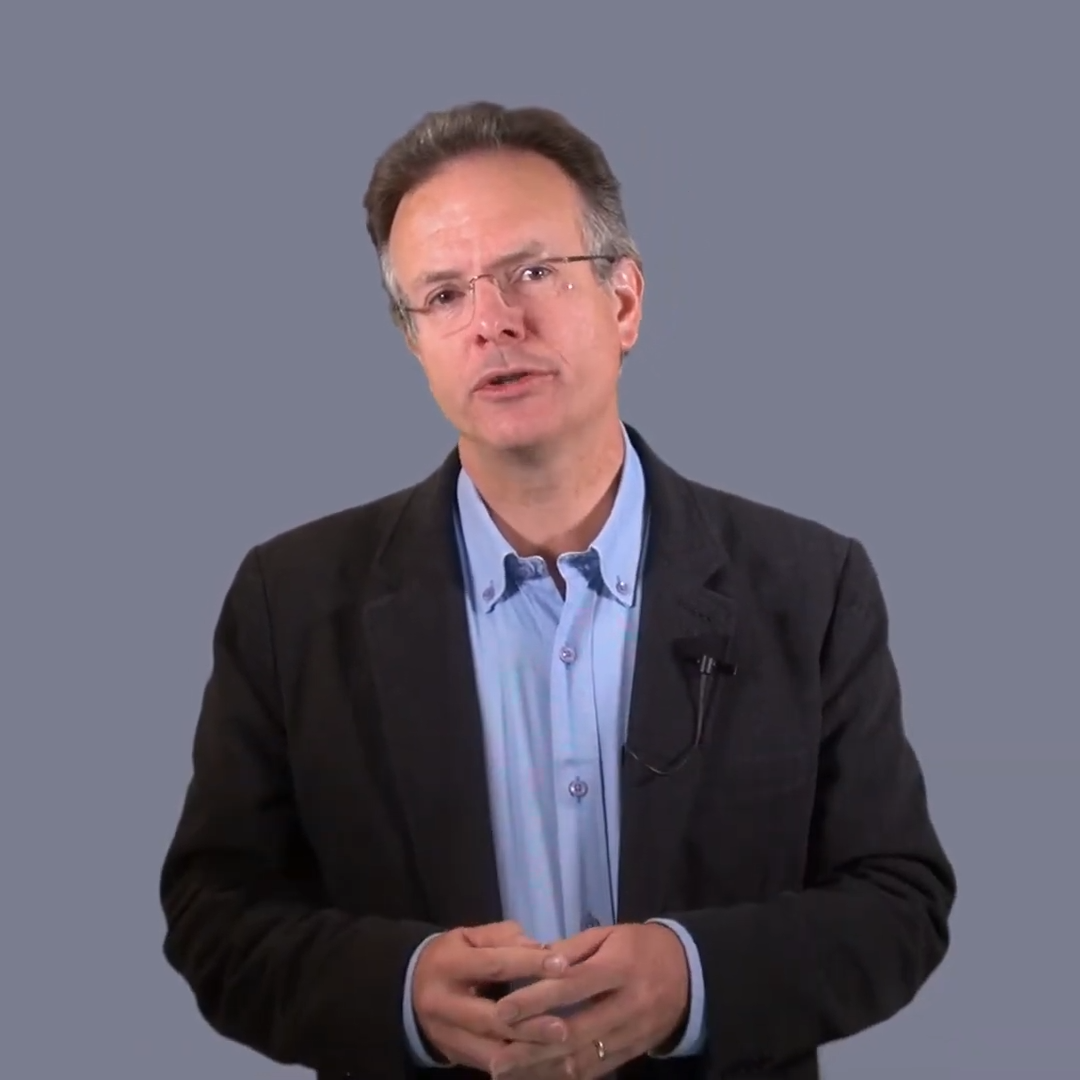
- Clough in 2017
- Born: David Lennard Clough; 6 June 1968 (age 58); England

Education
- Education: Natural Sciences, Theology, Philosophy, Ethics (BA, MA, Ph.D.)
- Alma mater: Yale University; St. Cross College, Oxford

Philosophical work
- Era: Contemporary philosophy
- Region: Western philosophy
- School: Christian Ethics
- Institutions: St. Cross College, Oxford; Yale University; St Chad's College, Durham; St John's College, Durham; Chester University; University of Aberdeen
- Main interests: Applied ethics · Bioethics · Christian vegetarianism

David Lennard Clough (born 6 June 1968) is a British author and academic with a focus on the Christian vegetarian and Christian vegan movements. He is Professor in Theology and Applied Sciences at the University of Aberdeen and a Methodist preacher. He is also the founder and a co-director of the CreatureKind project which focuses on the welfare of farmed animals as a faith issue.

He is the author of a number of books on animal rights and in particular the use of animals for food including his two-volume monograph entitled On Animals Volume 1, Systematic Theology (2011) and On Animals Volume 2, Systematic Theology (2018). He was also co-editor of the collection of essays Creaturely Theology: on God, Humans and other animals (2009). He has written articles on the ethics of the use of animals for food, including Consuming Animal Creatures: The Christian Ethics of Eating Animals (2016) published in Studies in Christian Ethics.

Clough has given a number of keynote speeches, including at the Sarx Creature Conference in March 2017 and has been a participant in many public debates including a debate with Peter Singer on the theology and ethics of the treatment of non-human animals. In 2019 Clough delivered the May Macleod Lecture at the United Theological College in Sydney Australia.

== Education ==
Clough earned a Bachelor of Arts degree and a Master of Arts degree from Cambridge University in natural sciences and theology in 1989. In 1993, Clough earned an M.St. from St. Cross College at Oxford University. In 2000 he completed his Ph.D. at Yale University on the work of Karl Barth.

== Career ==
Clough completed his doctoral studies at Yale University. Following this he was F.D. Maurice Postdoctoral Fellow in Christian Ethics at St Chad's College, Durham. Clough then went on to teach ethics and systematic theology at St. John's College. He was President of the Society for the Study of Christian Ethics from 2014 through to 2018, convened the Theological Ethics seminar at the Society for the Study of Theology, Co-Chaired the Animals and Religion Group of the American Academy of Religion, and was a visiting professor at the Centre for Animal Welfare at the University of Winchester. Between 2007 and 2021, he was Professor of Theological Ethics in the Department of Theology and Religious Studies at the University of Chester. He is currently Professor in Theology and Applied Sciences at the University of Aberdeen.

Previous to his work on animal ethics Clough worked on the ethics of Karl Barth and Christian pacifism, church responses to poverty, the theological ethics of investment, and the theological and ethical implications of modern technological developments including the ethics of the Internet (for example in his book Unweaving the Web (2002)).

His most recent work has been on the approaches taken to the place of animals by Christian theology and ethics. From 2018 to 2020 he was Principal Investigator on an AHRC-funded three-year project on the Christian Ethics of Farmed Animal Welfare. This included working with 13 partners including major UK churches.

== Selected works ==
Author

- Unweaving the Web (Grove Books, 2002)
- Ethics in Crisis: Interpreting Barth's Ethics (Routledge, 2005)
- with Brian Stiltner. Faith and Force: A Christian Debate about War (Georgetown University Press, 2007)
- with Richard Higginson. The Ethics of Executive Pay (Grove Books, 2010)
- On Animals Volume 1, Systematic Theology (T&T Clark, 2011)
- On Animals Volume 2, Systematic Theology (T&T Clark, 2018)

Editor

- with Celia E. Deane-Drummond. Creaturely Theology: on God, Humans and other animals (SCM Press 2009)
- with Celia E. Deane-Drummond and Rebecca Artinian-Kaiser Animals as Religious Subjects Transdisciplinary Perspectives (T&T Clark 2013)

== See also ==
- Animal rights
- Animal welfare
- Andrew Linzey
- Peter Singer
- Christian vegetarianism
- Vegetarianism and religion
