= SSCE =

SSCE may refer to:

- Senior Secondary Certificate of Education, Australia
- Senior Secondary Certificate Examination, Nigeria
- Society for the Study of Christian Ethics, United Kingdom
- Sri Sairam College of Engineering, Bangalore, Karnataka, India
- Solid Surface Combustion Experiment, carried out on several NASA flights, e.g. STS-54
- Sequential sector conjunctival epitheliectomy; see Limbal stem cell deficiency
