= Atheïstisch manifest =

Dutch-language book by Herman Philipse

Atheïstisch manifest en De onredelijkheid van religie
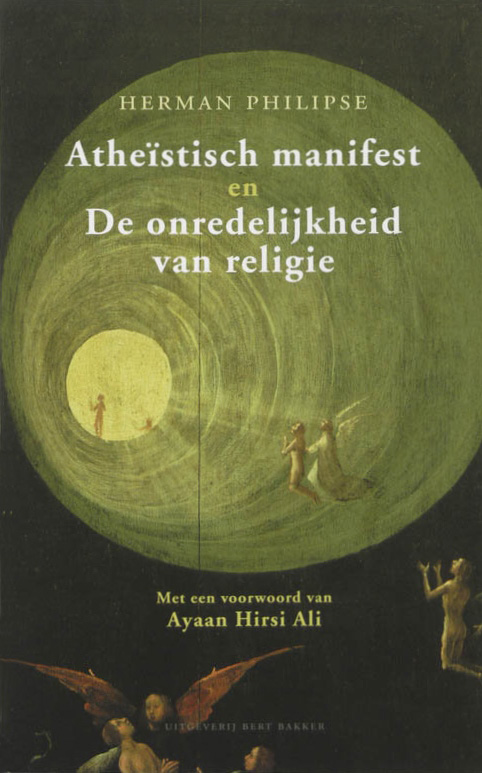
- 2004 cover.
- Author: Herman Philipse; Ayaan Hirsi Ali (preface 2004)
- Original title: Atheïstisch manifest: drie wijsgerige opstellen over godsdienst en moraal
- Language: Dutch
- Subject: Criticism of religion, philosophy, morality, science
- Publisher: Prometheus
- Publication date: October 1995; Re-release March 2004
- Publication place: Netherlands
- Media type: Paperback
- Pages: 128 (1995); 197 (2004)
- ISBN: 9035126548

Atheïstisch manifest: drie wijsgerige opstellen over godsdienst en moraal ("Atheist Manifesto: Three Philosophical Essays on Religion and Morality") is an essay bundle by the Dutch philosopher Herman Philipse. Originally published in 1995, Philipse brought out a new version in 2004 that included a new bundle of four essays titled De onredelijkheid van religie ("The Unreasonableness of Religion"). The compilation was published under the name Atheïstisch manifest en De onredelijkheid van religie ("Atheist Manifesto and The Unreasonableness of Religion").

In the short book, Philipse opines that one can speak rationally about the existence of God, but if one wishes to take the natural sciences seriously, one needs to reject the traditional meaning of the word 'God'. However, if one wished to define the word 'God' as something unknowable, God cannot have any descriptive contents and therefore not exist. Thus there is no grounding for theistic morality.

Philipse's Atheïstisch manifest got him into a fierce argument with several theologians, including Eginhard Meijering, Vincent Brümmer and Harry Kuitert, who replied to him disapprovingly, and eventually faced him in a debate on "the tenability of atheism" in the spring of 1996. Philipse claimed that all arguments thus far proposed for the existence of God were invalid, while the theologians argued Philipse had insufficiently delved into the matter, missed the religious context, and ignored how much consolation belief in God offered.

In the aftermath of the September 11 attacks, Ayaan Hirsi Ali read Atheïstisch manifest in 2002, which led her to her definitive apostasy, after which she famously became a critic of Islam. Before her conversion to Christianity, Ayaan believed that reason and individual freedom were incompatible with any religious faith. For Philipse, too, the topic of religion and morality once again gained urgency because of "9/11", whereupon he decided to write four new essays on the relationship between religion and science under the title of De onredelijkheid van religie, and combine it with his 1995 work. The entire composition, complete with a preface written by Hirsi Ali, was published in 2004 under the name Atheïstisch manifest en De onredelijkheid van religie.

In 2012, Philipse published a new and much more elaborate book, God in the Age of Science?, as an improvement on Atheïstisch manifest. He commented on the issue: "It was a matter of conscience. Everyone in the Netherlands knows me only because of that odd manifesto. Well, that frustrates one. I wanted to research the question really well for once. So that they can no longer say: you have merely written a superficial booklet about it."
