= Basil Mitchell (academic) =

English philosopher and theologian (1917–2011)

Basil George Mitchell
- Born: April 9, 1917
- Died: June 23, 2011 (aged 94)
- Awards: Fellow of the British Academy (FBA)

Education
- Education: King Edward VI School, Southampton
- Alma mater: The Queen's College, Oxford

Philosophical work
- Era: 20th-century philosophy
- School: Analytic philosophy, Anglican
- Institutions: Keble College, Oxford; Oriel College, Oxford
- Main interests: Philosophy of religion, Ethics, Philosophy of law

Basil George Mitchell FBA (9 April 1917 – 23 June 2011) was an English philosopher and at one time Nolloth Professor of the Philosophy of the Christian Religion at the University of Oxford. Mitchell argued for the place of religious belief in public debate and criticised liberal humanism.

== Background ==
Mitchell was the son of George William Mitchell and Mary Mitchell, née Loxston. He was educated at King Edward VI School, Southampton and The Queen's College, Oxford. His father was a disciple of the Sufi mystic Inayat Khan. In 1940, Basil's family put up Khan's widow and children, including the future SOE agent Noor Inayat Khan, in their house in Southampton after the Khans arrived in England fleeing the German occupation of France. Basil was instrumental in introducing Jean Overton Fuller, Noor Inayat Khan's friend and biographer, to Noor.

During World War II, Mitchell served in the Royal Navy from 1940 until 1946. He served primarily as an instructor, in the Mediterranean. In 1950 he married Margaret Eleanor Collin. They had one son and three daughters.

== Influence ==
In 1947, Mitchell embarked on an academic career as a tutor in philosophy at Keble College, Oxford. In 1955 he was elected president of the Oxford Socratic Club, a position he held until 1972 when the club was dissolved. Later, Mitchell was instrumental in creating a new Oxford honours school devoted to philosophy and theology.

Early books on the philosophy of religion and of law include Faith and Logic (1957) and the edited anthology Law, Morality and Religion in a Secular Society (1966), which was a contribution to the debate over law and morality between H. L. A. Hart and Patrick Devlin.

He moved to Oriel College, Oxford in 1968 to take up a university chair. His inaugural lecture, "Neutrality and Commitment", attracted much favourable comment at the time. Later, Mitchell was instrumental in creating a new Oxford honours school devoted to philosophy and theology. Mitchell delivered the 1974–1976 Gifford Lectures at the University of Glasgow entitled Morality, Religious and Secular. The Justification of Religious Belief (1981), his Sarum Lectures Faith and Criticism (1992), and a collection of essays called How to Play Theological Ping-Pong (1993).

Mitchell edited a widely used "Oxford Reading in Philosophy" anthology: The Philosophy of Religion. Mitchell's pamphlet entitled Can Social Policy Be Morally Neutral? was published by The Social Affairs Unit. He was prominent in the Church of England, and on several of its doctrinal commissions on faith and morals. In 2013, David Brown memorialized him in the Biographical Memoirs of Fellows of the British Academy, XII 303–321.

Two notable contributions to the philosophy of religion were his short essay in the "Theology and Falsification" debate between Antony Flew, R. M. Hare and himself, in which he tried to counter Flew's parable of the "invisible gardener" with his own "parable of the partisan", and his development of a "cumulative-case" method of justifying religious belief, notably in his book The Justification of Religious Belief. Mitchell drew attention to the philosophy of John Henry Newman, notably in casting "doubt upon the credentials of science itself as an avenue to truth". He added: "The paradigm instance of factual knowledge, by comparison with which the claims of religion were thought to be problematic, can no longer be made to serve this purpose." He saw an analogy with "the situation in which Newman found himself as he struggled to analyse the nature of reason and its relation to Christian Faith."

== Festschrift ==
Further contributions include an essay on "The Christian Conscience" to the Oxford Illustrated History of Christianity. He wrote an autobiographical essay, "War and Friendship", for the Kelly James Clark anthology, Philosophers Who Believe. In 2003, he co-wrote An Engagement with Plato's Republic, with his Oxford friend and fellow philosopher J. R. Lucas.

Steven Holtzer and William Abraham co-edited a Festschrift for him, The Rationality of Religious Belief, which includes an appreciation of his thought and character by Oliver O'Donovan, and an essay on the Eucharist by Michael Dummett. In 2009, he published a memoir, Looking Back: on Faith, Philosophy and Friends in Oxford.

Academic offices
Preceded by Ian Ramsey	Nolloth Professor of the Philosophy of the Christian Religion; 1968–1985	Succeeded by Richard Swinburne
