= Ann Loades =

British theologian (1938–2022)

Ann Lomas Loades, CBE (née Glover; 21 September 1938 – 6 December 2022) was a British theologian and academic, who specialised in Christian feminism.

== Early life and education ==
Loades was born on 21 September 1938 in Stockport, Cheshire, England. She was raised by her mother who was a nurse, after her father abandoned the family. She was educated at boarding schools from the age of three, first a Bowdon Preparatory School for Girls in Cheshire and then at Hulme Grammar School for Girls in Oldham. She was head girl of her senior school.

She studied theology at Durham University from 1957 to 1960. She was a member of St Mary's College. The main focus of the course was to prepare candidates for ordination in the Church of England, but her tutor, Professor Alec Whitehouse, also introduced her to philosophical theology and the philosophy of religion which would become the focus of her career. She graduated in 1960 with a Bachelor of Arts (BA) degree.

After completing her bachelor's, she became a teacher at Newbury County Girls' Grammar. After two years, she returned to university and undertook postgraduate studies at McMaster University in Hamilton, Ontario, Canada. She graduated with a master's degree in 1965.

== Academic career ==
Loades spent all her academic career at Durham University. She began her staff association with the university as a resident tutor at St Mary's College and then at Collingwood College. During this time, she undertook a Doctor of Philosophy (PhD) degree on Immanuel Kant under the unofficial supervision of John W. Rogerson. She completed her PhD in 1975.

She was appointed a lecturer in philosophical theology at Durham University in 1975; the first person to be appointed to the department in that specialism, rather than the more traditional areas of biblical studies, church history, and patristic theology. She was promoted to senior lecturer in 1981 and to reader in 1990. She served as head of department from 1989 to 1991. She held a personal chair as Professor of Divinity from 1995 to 2003. Following retirement, she was an emeritus professor at Durham University and, from 2009, an honorary professor at the University of St Andrews.

Loades was also editor of the Theology journal from 1991 to 1997. She was a member of the Church of England's doctrine commission from 1995 and 2002. She was president of the Society for the Study of Theology from 2005 to 2006.

== Personal life and death ==
In 1965, Ann Glover married David Loades, a historian and academic at Durham University. They did not have any children, and their marriage ended in divorce in 1981. She died at Ninewells Hospital in Dundee, Scotland on 6 December 2022, aged 84.

== Honours ==
In the 2001 New Year Honours, Loades was appointed a Commander of the Order of the British Empire (CBE) for service to theology. In 2008, a Festschrift was published in her honour titled "Exchanges of Grace: Essays in Honour of Ann Loades".

== Selected works ==
- Loades, Ann (1985). Kant and Job's comforters. Newcastle Upon Tyne: Avero. ISBN 9780907977124.
- Loades, Ann, ed. (1990). Feminist theology: a reader. London: SPCK. ISBN 978-0281044504.
- Brown, David; Loades, Ann, eds. (1995). The sense of the sacramental: movement and measure in art and music, place and time. London: SPCK. ISBN 978-0281048496.
- Farrer, Austin (2006). Loades, Ann; MacSwain, Robert (eds.). The truth-seeking heart: Austin Farrer and his writings. Norwich: Canterbury Press. ISBN 978-1853117121.
- Astley, Jeff; Brown, David; Loades, Ann, eds. (2009). Christology: key readings in Christian thought. London: SPCK. ISBN 978-0281061846.
- Loades, Ann (2021). Grace is not faceless reflections on Mary. London: Darton, Longman & Todd Ltd. ISBN 978-0232534207.
