= H. W. B. Joseph =

British philosopher (1867–1943

Horace William Brindley Joseph FBA (28 September 1867 – 13 November 1943), published as H. W. B. Joseph, was a British philosopher, who spent his academic career as a Fellow and Tutor at New College, Oxford.

== Biography ==
=== Early life ===
Horace William Brindley Joseph was born at Chatham, Kent, on 28 September 1867, the eldest surviving son of Alexander Joseph (died 1890), rector of St John's, Chatham, and Honorary Canon of Rochester Cathedral, and his wife, Janet Eleanor née Acworth (died 1917), daughter of George Acworth, a solicitor, and cousin of Sir William Acworth. Joseph attended Allhallows School in Honiton (1877–80) and then Winchester College as a scholar (1880–86; he went on to win three gold medals there and was a prefect). In 1886 he went up to New College, Oxford, as a scholar and obtained a first-class in Classical Moderations (Greek and Latin) in 1888 and in Literae Humaniores (philosophy and ancient history) in 1890. He secured the Junior Greek Testament Prize in 1889; and in 1891 he both won the Arnold Historical Essay Prize and was elected a Fellow of New College with an appointment as a lecturer in Philosophy.

=== Career ===
Joseph was appointed a Tutor at New College in 1892 and, when Alfred Robinson died in 1895, he became New College's Senior Philosophy Tutor (he remained in the position until 1932) and Junior Bursar (until 1919). He was also the University of Oxford's Senior Proctor for the 1906–07 academic year and Public Examiner for Literae Humaniores from 1910 to 1912 and again from 1921 to 1922. His philosophy was "firmly rooted" in Plato and Aristotle's and he was the University of Oxford's foremost lecturer on Plato's Republic; nevertheless, in his career he took greatest satisfaction out of his role as a tutor. His first book was An Introduction to Logic (1906; 2nd edition, 1916), and this was followed by The Labour Theory of Value in Karl Marx (1923) and Some Problems in Ethics (1931); in 1930, he was elected a Fellow of the British Academy (FBA). He retired in 1932, when he became a Supernumerary Fellow at New College; he published a collection of his essays, mostly earlier ones, as Essays in Ancient and Modern Philosophy (1935), including his Herbert Spencer Lecture "The Concept of Evolution" (1924), which Clement C. J. Webb and C. A. Creffield in the Oxford Dictionary of National Biography consider "perhaps the most important of his philosophical writings". Another work, Knowledge and the Good in Plato's Republic, was published in 1948, after Joseph had died, and across his career he had published several important articles in Mind; the journal carried an obituary of him when he died.

In retirement, Joseph continued to teach at New College and also served as a member of Oxford City Council and Chairman of its Education Committee. He lived in College during term, but stayed with his mother during vacations at Holford and then from 1912 at Dinder. In 1919 he married Margaret (died 1926), a daughter of Robert Bridges, but there were no children of their happy union. He established a music scholarship in her memory at his college and, after he died in the Acland Home, Oxford, on 13 November 1943, New College erected a memorial tablet to Joseph and his wife in its cloisters.

== Philosophy ==
According to Clement C. J. Webb and C. A. Creffield:

In his earlier writings at least, he was a realist in the school of Cook Wilson. But his doubts concerning the independent reality of space and the nature of solidity and magnitude caused a gradual return to a position similar to the idealism which had prevailed in Oxford during his undergraduate days. He was hostile towards formalism in logic, particularly towards Russell, and argued against the attempt to establish mathematics as the model of all thought.

— Clement C. J. Webb and C. A. Creffield, "Joseph, Horace William Brindley (1867–1943)", Oxford Dictionary of National Biography (2004)

== Selected publications ==
- An Introduction to Logic. 1906. 2nd edition, revised. 1916.
- Some Problems in Ethics. 1931.
- Essays in Ancient & Modern Philosophy. 1935.
