= Clement Charles Julian Webb =

English theologian and philosopher (1865–1954)

Clement Charles Julian Webb FBA (1865–1954) was an English theologian and philosopher. He was Nolloth Professor of the Philosophy of the Christian Religion from 1920 to 1930.

== Early life ==
Webb was born in London on 25 June 1865, the son of the clergyman Benjamin Webb and his wife Maria, daughter of the academic William Hodge Mill. He attended Westminster School from 1876 to 1884, where he was a queen's scholar and the school captain. He then studied classics at Christ Church, Oxford, from 1884 to 1889; though initially not a spectacular student, he graduated with a first-class degree.

== Academic career ==
Webb was elected to a fellowship at Magdalen College, Oxford, in 1889. He taught at New College, Oxford, initially before taking up a tutorship at Magdalen in 1890; at the latter, he was also senior dean from 1894 to 1897 and vice-president from 1898 to 1899. He served as senior proctor of the university in 1905–06 and held other administrative positions. In 1911, he was elected Wilde Lecturer in Natural and Comparative Religion for a period of three years. He was also Gifford Lecturer at the University of Aberdeen (1918–19). In 1920, Webb was appointed the inaugural holder of the Nolloth Chair of the Philosophy of the Christian Religion at Oriel College, Oxford (where he was also elected a fellow in 1922). He remained there until he retired in 1930, after which he was the Stephanos Nirmalendu Ghosh Lecturer at the University of Calcutta (1930–31), Olaus Petri Lecturer at Uppsala University (1932), Forwood Lecturer at the University of Liverpool (1933) and Lewis Fry Lecturer at the University of Bristol (1934).

Webb received several higher doctorates: the LLD from the University of St Andrews (1921), the DLitt from the University of Oxford (1930), the DTheol from Uppsala University (1932) and the DD from the University of Glasgow in 1937. He was elected a Fellow of the British Academy in 1927, and was an honorary fellow of Magdalen College from 1938 and an honorary student at Christ Church from 1953. He died on 5 October 1954 in Aylesbury, where he had retired to in the late 1930s. He was married to Eleanor Theodora, née Joseph (daughter of Rev. Alexander Joseph and sister of the philosopher Horace Joseph), former student of Somerville College and founding member of the discussion group known as the Associated Prigs, who died in 1942; they had no children.

== Selected works ==
- (editor), St Anselm, The Devotions of St Anselm (London: Methuen and Co., 1903)
- (editor), John of Salisbury, Joannis Saresberiensis Episcopi Carnotensis Policratici sive de Nugis Curialium et Vestigiis Philosophorum libri VIII (Oxford: Clarendon Press, 1909)
- Problems in the Relations of God and Man (London: James Nisbet and Co., 1911)
- Natural and Comparative Religion (Oxford: Clarendon Press, 1912)
- Studies in the History of Natural Theology (Oxford: Clarendon Press, 1915)
- History of Philosophy (Home University Library, 1915)
- Group Theories of Religion and the Individual (London: G. Allen and Unwin, 1916)
- In Time of War: Addresses upon Several Occasions (Oxford: B. H. Blackwell, 1918)
- God and Personality (Abingdon: Routledge, 1918).
- Divine Personality and Human Life (London: G. Allen and Unwin, 1920)
- Kant's Philosophy of Religion (Oxford: Clarendon Press, 1926)
- Religion and the Thought of To-Day (London: Oxford University Press, 1929)
- Pascal's Philosophy of Religion (Oxford: Clarendon Press, 1929)
- John of Salisbury (London: Methuen and Co., 1932)
- The Contribution of Christianity to Ethics (Kolkata: University of Calcutta, 1932)
- A Study of Religious Thought in England from 1850 (Oxford: Clarendon Press, 1933)
- Religion and Theism (London: G. Allen and Unwin, 1933)
- The Historical Element in Religion (London: G. Allen and Unwin, 1935)
- Religious Experience (London: Oxford University Press, 1945)
