= David Loades =

British historian

David Michael Loades FSA (19 January 1934 – 21 April 2016) was a British historian specialising in the Tudor era. He served in the RAF 1953–55 and gained his BA and PhD at Emmanuel College, Cambridge. He was Emeritus Professor of History at the University of Wales, where he taught from 1980 until 1996, and was Honorary Research Professor at the University of Sheffield from 1996 until 2008. In the 1960s and 1970s he taught at the universities of St. Andrews and Durham. From 1993 until 2004 he acted as Literary Director of the John Foxe Project at the British Academy; he subsequently became an Honorary Member of the History Faculty at the University of Oxford. After military service in the Royal Air Force 1953–1955, Loades studied at the University of Cambridge. He wrote many books on the Tudor period, including biographies. He was President of the Ecclesiastical History Society (1992–93).

From 1965 to 1981, he was married to Ann (née Glover). They did not have any children, and their marriage ended in divorce.

== Works ==
- Two Tudor Conspiracies (Cambridge University Press, 1965; new edition Headstart, 1992)
- The Oxford Martyrs (Batsford, 1970; Headstart, 1992)
- Politics and the Nation, 1450–1660 (Fontana, 1974; subsequent editions 1979, 1986, 1992, 1999)
- The Reign of Mary Tudor (Benn, 1979, second edition Longmans, 1991; German translation 1982)
- Mary Tudor: A Life (Blackwell, 1989)
- The Tudor Court (Batsford, 1986)
- The Tudor Navy: An Administrative, Political and Military History (Aldershot, 1992)
- The Mid-Tudor Crisis, 1545–1565 (Palgrave Macmillan, 1992)
- The Politics of Marriage: Henry VIII and his Queens (Sutton, 1994; several subsequent editions; translated into Spanish and Russian)
- Essays on the Reign of Edward VI (Headstart, 1994)
- John Dudley, Duke of Northumberland 1504–1553 (Oxford University Press, 1996)
- Tudor Government (Blackwell, 1997)
- Power in Tudor England (Macmillan, 1997)
- England's Maritime Empire: Seapower, Commerce and Policy, 1490–1690 (Longmans, 2000)
- Elizabeth I (Hambledon Continuum, 2003)
- Elizabeth I: The Golden Reign of Gloriana (The National Archives, 2003)
- Intrigue and Treason: The Tudor Court 1547–1558 (Pearson Longmans, 2004)
- Mary Tudor: The Tragical History of the First Queen of England (The National Archives, 2006)
- The Cecils: Privilege and Power behind the Throne (The National Archives, 2007)
- Henry VIII: Court, Church and Conflict (The National Archives, 2007)
- The Princes of Wales (The National Archives, 2008)
- The Life and Career of William Paulet, c.1475–1572 (Ashgate, 2008)
- The Fighting Tudors (The National Archives, 2009)
- The Tudor Queens of England (Hambledon Continuum 2009)
- Henry VIII: King and Court (The Pitkin Guide, 2009)
- The Tudors for Dummies (John Wylie & Sons, 2010)
- Henry VIII (Amberley, 2011)
- The Boleyns (Amberley, 2011)
- The Tudors: History of a Dynasty (Continuum, 2012)
- Mary Rose: Tudor Princess, Queen of France. The Extraordinary Life of Henry VIII's Sister (Amberley, 2012)
- Catherine Howard: The Adulterous Wife of Henry VIII (Amberley, 2012)
- Jane Seymour: Henry VIII's Favourite Wife (Amberley, 2013)
- The Kings & Queens of England: The Biography (Amberley, 2013)
- Thomas Cromwell: Servant to Henry VIII (Amberley, 2013)
- The Seymours of Wolf Hall: A Tudor Family Story (Amberley, 2015)

Professional and academic associations
Preceded by Barrie Dobson	President of the Ecclesiastical History Society; 1992–1993	Succeeded by Janet Nelson
