= Nolloth Professor of the Philosophy of the Christian Religion =

Chair at the University of Oxford

The Nolloth Professor of the Philosophy of the Christian Religion is a chair at the University of Oxford, associated with Oriel College. The chair was established in 1920 by an endowment from Charles Frederick Nolloth, on the basis of lectures delivered by Clement Webb. The post holder is to "lecture and give instruction in the Philosophy of the Christian Religion including Apologetics, that is, the setting forth of the reasonableness as well as the authority of the Christian Religion, and shall generally promote the study of those subjects in the University".

== List of Nolloth Professors ==
- 1920–1930 Clement Webb
- 1930?–1951 Laurence Grensted
- 1951–1966 Ian Ramsey
- 1968–1985 Basil Mitchell
- 1985–2003 Richard Swinburne
- 2003–2018 Brian Leftow
- Since 2020 Mark Wynn
