= Laurence Grensted =

British priest and theologian (1884–1964)

- Born: 1884
- Died: 1964 (aged 79–80)
- Occupations: Professor, chaplain
- Known for: Philosophy of the Christian religion; Bampton Lectures on Psychology and God (1930)
- Title: Nolloth Professor of the Philosophy of the Christian Religion

Academic background
- Education: University College, Oxford

Academic work
- Era: 20th century
- Discipline: Philosophy
- Sub-discipline: Christian religion
- Institutions: University of Oxford
- Main interests: Philosophy of the Christian religion
- Notable works: A Short History of the Doctrine of the Atonement (1920)

Laurence William Grensted (1884–1964) was a British Anglican priest and theologian. He was Nolloth Professor of the Philosophy of the Christian Religion, associated with Oriel College at the University of Oxford.

Laurence Grensted studied at University College, Oxford and was subsequently a Fellow and Chaplain there from 1924 to 1930. He was the author of A Short History of the Doctrine of the Atonement, published in 1920.

Grensted delivered the 1930 Bampton Lectures at Oxford on Psychology and God, a study of the implications of recent psychology for religious belief and practice.

Grensted was a member of the Royal Entomological Society. He was later Canon and then Canon Emeritus at Liverpool Cathedral.

Photographs of Laurence Grensted are held in the collection of the National Portrait Gallery, London.

== Personal life ==
Grensted's parents were Frederic Finnis Grensted (1857–1919), who was the vicar of Melling, and Gertrude Ellen Grensted (née Plimpton, 1858–1927).

Grensted had a younger brother named Alfred (1887–1916) who was a bank clerk and rugby player for Lancashire: Alfred served with the Royal Welsh Fusiliers in WW1 and was killed at the Somme.

Grensted married Norah Frances Knott of Wilmslow on 15 December 1923. They had two sons: Alfred David Grensted (1925–1960) and Peter Eric Wakefield Grensted (1928–2004).

Entomological collecting

Grensted encouraged his children to share his interest in entomology and in the 1930s and early 1940s Grensted and his sons went upon insect collecting excursions in England and Wales. Some specimens collected by the Grensted family are now in the collection of the Natural History Museum, London (e.g.: Alfred's Orthotrichia costalis (Curtis, 1834) from Portmadoc [Porthmadog] collected in 1939, Peter's Wormaldia occipitalis (Pictet, 1834) collected in Lyme Park, Cheshire in 1937 and Laurence Grensted's own Philopotamus montanus (Donovan, 1813) collected at Lynton in Devon in 1935).

Academic offices
Preceded by Clement Webb	Nolloth Professor of the Philosophy of the Christian Religion; 1930?–1951	Succeeded by Ian Ramsey
