= Studies in Christian Ethics =

- Discipline: Christian ethics, moral theology
- Language: English
- Edited by: Susan Frank Parsons

Publication details
- History: 1988-present
- Publisher: SAGE Publications on behalf of the Society for the Study of Christian Ethics (United Kingdom)
- Frequency: Quarterly
- Impact factor: (2010)

Standard abbreviations
- ISO 4: Stud. Christ. Ethics

Indexing
- ISSN: 0953-9468 (print); 1745-5235 (web)
- LCCN: 93020035
- OCLC no.: 427385860

Links
- Journal homepage; Online access; Online archive

Studies in Christian Ethics is a quarterly peer-reviewed academic journal that covers Christian ethics and moral theology. The editor-in-chief is Susan Frank Parsons. It was established in 1988 and is currently published by SAGE Publications on behalf of the Society for the Study of Christian Ethics.

== Abstracting and indexing ==
Studies in Christian Ethics is abstracted and indexed in:

- Index theologicus
- International Bibliography of Periodical Literature
- Religion & Philosophy Collection
- Scopus
