= God in the Age of Science? =

2012 book by Herman Philipse

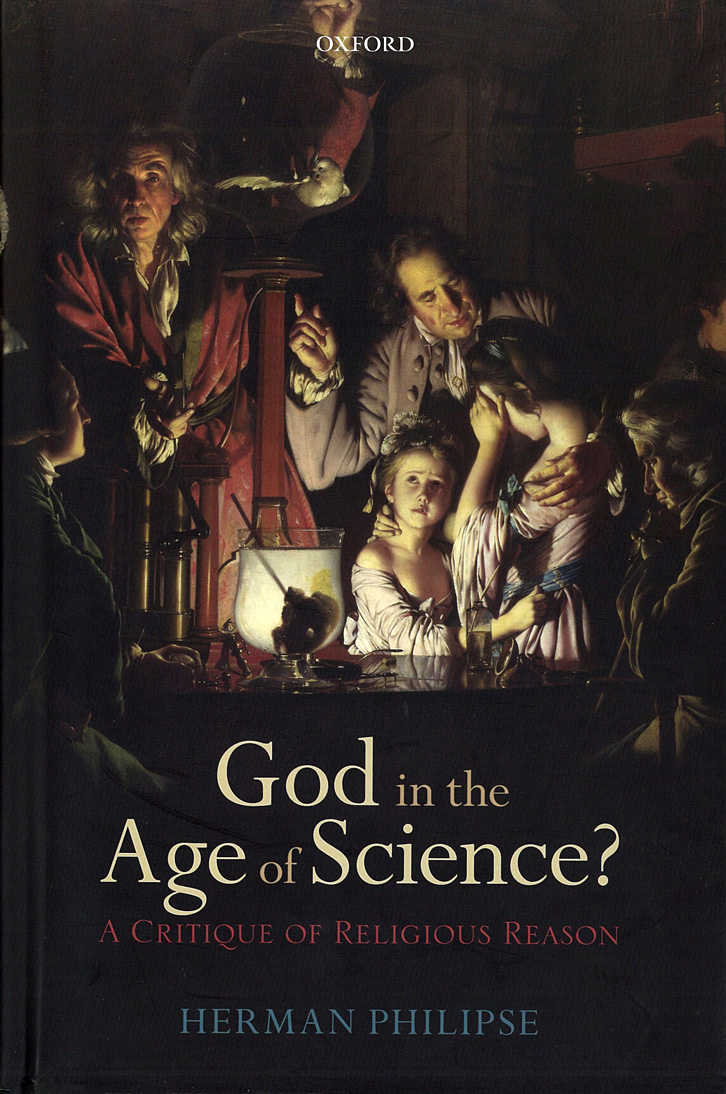
- Author: Herman Philipse
- Language: English
- Subject: Religion, philosophy
- Publisher: Oxford University Press
- Publication date: February 2012
- Publication place: United Kingdom
- Media type: Hardcover
- Pages: 400
- ISBN: 0199697531

God in the Age of Science? A Critique of Religious Reason is a 2012 book by the Dutch philosopher Herman Philipse, written in English and published in the United Kingdom. Philipse found his Atheist Manifesto (1995) to be too hastily and superficially written, and decided to set up a more complete work to systematically refute all the arguments for the existence of God and adherence to any form of theism.

To gain insight in how a religious person substantiates the existence of God, Philipse presents a "religious decision tree" that leads to four categories of theists. He starts by asking:

Is the statement "God exists" a factual truth claim?

1. If not, somebody claims that God does not factually exists, but is merely a metaphor. Defenders of this position are, according to Philipse, following the tradition of Wittgenstein, and are currently represented by people like D.Z. Phillips and Karen Armstrong.
2. If yes, is it necessary to invoke any kind of (logical) argumentation or (empirical) evidence to back up this truth claim?
  1. If not, somebody claims that God factually exists, but that one may assert this without invoking any kind of argumentation or evidence. Alvin Plantinga is among those defending this position, aiming to explain the world in the case God exists, which itself remains a matter of faith (an axiom or presupposition, according to Plantinga).
  2. If yes, does this argumentation or evidence need to be scientific in nature (to have gone through the scientific method), and is there no possibility to completely achieve a proof of God through one's own standards?
    1. If not, somebody claims that God factually exists, and that one can prove this, but not in a scientific manner. Defenders of this position make use of what Philipse calls "typically religious arguments", such as revelation, religious texts, religious experience, prayer, speaking in tongues, a convulsion with foam at the mouth etc. Although himself an agnostic, the evolutionary biologist Stephen Jay Gould described this point of view as non-overlapping magisteria (NOMA): science and religion are two entirely different enterprises and have nothing to say about each other; therefore, science cannot assess the existence of God. The opposite of this is the god of the gaps argument, namely that if science can't explain any given phenomenon, religion can, often by postulating a god.
    2. If yes, somebody claims that God factually exists, and that his existence can be demonstrated using scientific evidence. This position is held by people like Richard Swinburne and Stephen D. Unwin, who, for example, try to show the probability of God's existence using Bayes' theorem. The pseudoscientific intelligent design movement (ID) claimed to possess scientific evidence for the traditional divine creation myth that would refute the theory of evolution (among other scientific facts). Aside from ID, there are many other creationist movements with scientific pretenses.

Next, Philipse tries to refute arguments from every category step by step, but especially from the last case, namely Bayes' theorem as used by Swinburne. Based on his critiques of the last two cases ("God is supernatural" and "God's existence is within reach of natural theology") he concludes that:

1. God's existence is a meaningless predicate, according to the definitions of substance dualists and supernaturalists. (See also, theological noncognitivism).
2. If theism were meaningful, it would have no predictive power upon the existing evidence, because theists render the claim unfalsifiable every time evidence on the contrary is explained away with responses like "God works in mysterious ways" (See also the problem of evil). Therefore Bayesian arguments are inapplicable.
3. Therefore, because neither strategy is epistemologically satisfactory, one should conclude that atheism is a more principled position than theism.

== See also ==
- Criticism of religion
- Existence of God
- Natural theology
- Presuppositional apologetics
- Relationship between religion and science
- Revealed theology
