= David Brown (theologian) =

Anglican priest and theologian

The Reverend Canon Professor David William Brown
- Wardlaw Professor Emeritus of Theology, Aesthetics and Culture
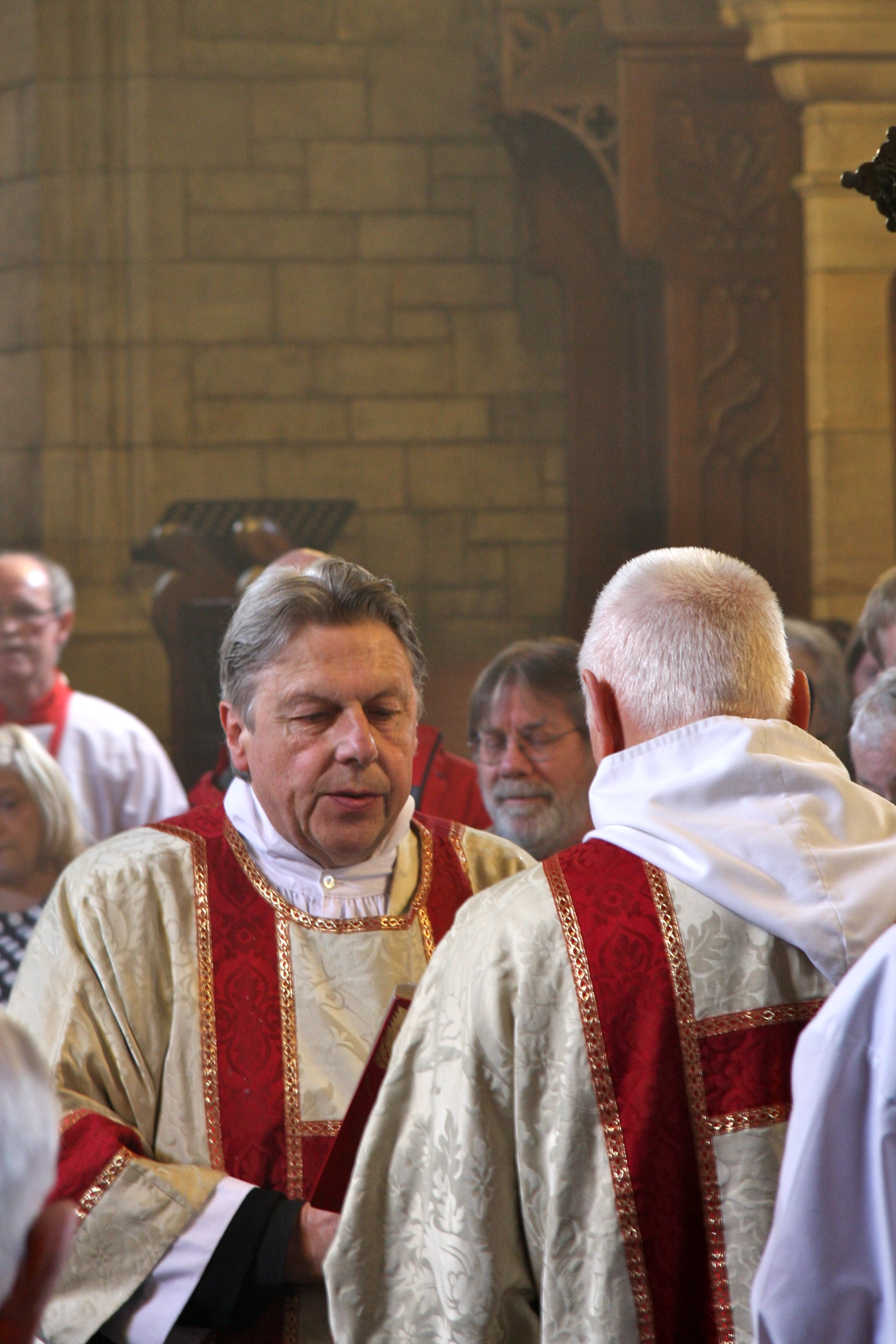

Orders
- Ordination: 1976, deacon; 1977, priest

Personal details
- Born: 1 July 1948 (age 78) Galashiels, Scotland
- Denomination: Anglican
- Residence: Mansfield, Tayport

David William Brown FRSE FBA (born 1 July 1948) is an Anglican priest and British scholar of philosophy, theology, religion, and the arts. He taught at the universities of Oxford, Durham, and St. Andrews before retiring in 2015. He is well-known for his "non-punitive theory of purgatory, his defense of specific versions of social Trinitarianism and kenotic Christology, his distinctive theory of divine revelation as mediated fallibly through both tradition and imagination, and his proposals regarding a pervasive sacramentality discerned in nature and human culture alike."

== Education and academic / ecclesial career ==
Brown was born in Galashiels, Scotland and educated at Edinburgh University (MA, Classics, 1970), Oxford University (BA, later promoted to MA, Philosophy and Theology, 1972), and Cambridge University (PhD, Philosophy, 1975: thesis, 'Naturalism in Ethics'). He trained for ordained ministry in the Church of England at Westcott House, Cambridge (1975–76). At Oriel College, Oxford, his primary philosophical mentors were Jonathan Barnes and Basil Mitchell, and at Clare College, Cambridge, his doctoral supervisors were Elizabeth Anscombe and Bernard Williams.

After his studies at Cambridge Brown returned to Oriel College, Oxford, in 1976 as Fellow and Chaplain until 1990. From 1977 he was College Tutor in Philosophy and Theology, and from 1984 he was also University Lecturer in Ethics and Philosophical Theology. In 1986 he became a member of the Church of England's Doctrine Commission and contributed to two reports: We Believe in the Holy Spirit (1989) and The Mystery of Salvation (1995). During the latter half of his time on the Commission he also served as its Deputy Chair.

In 1990 Brown was appointed as the Van Mildert Professor of Divinity at Durham University and Residentiary Canon of Durham Cathedral, succeeding Daniel W. Hardy and then in 2007 being succeeded by Mark McIntosh. In 2002, while still at Durham, he was elected as a Fellow of the British Academy, and served as a member of the Council from 2008 to 2011. At Durham Cathedral he served as Canon Librarian and chaired several artistic projects involving stained glass, altar frontals, and painting. In 2007 Brown was appointed to a personal chair as Wardlaw Professor of Theology, Aesthetics, and Culture, at St Mary's College, University of St Andrews. He was simultaneously appointed as a Professorial Fellow of the Institute for Theology, Imagination and the Arts (ITIA), and was acting Director of ITIA in 2014–15.

In 2012 Brown was awarded a D.Litt. from Edinburgh University—not an honorary degree but a higher doctorate earned on the basis of submitted published work—and in the same year was elected as a Fellow of the Royal Society of Edinburgh. He retired from St. Andrews in 2015 and is currently a Wardlaw Professor Emeritus of the University. He served as President of the Society for the Study of Theology (SST) in 2015–16. On 25 August 2024 he was installed as Canon Theologian at St. Paul's Cathedral, Dundee in Dundee, Scotland.

He was created Companion of the Roll of Honour of the Memorial of Merit of King Charles the Martyr in 2019.

== Intellectual profile ==
Brown's scholarship has focused on four areas: the relation between philosophy and theology, sacramental theology, theology and the arts, and Anglican studies.

His period at Oxford was primarily concerned with philosophical theology, and during his tenure as Fellow and Chaplain he worked closely with his Oriel colleagues Basil Mitchell and Richard Swinburne, two successive Nolloth Professors of the Philosophy of the Christian Religion. He was identified at this point with analytic philosophy of religion, but also with a rigorously historical-critical approach to Scripture. While at Oriel he published The Divine Trinity (1985), a critique of contemporary deism and unitarianism and a defense of continuing divine action, progressive revelation, the full personhood of the Holy Spirit, and a social model of the Trinity. Brown did not explicitly defend a kenotic model of the Incarnation in this volume, but his sympathetic treatment of kenosis here was much later developed into a full study and defense in Divine Humanity (2010/2011). In 1985 he published an influential article titled "No Heaven Without Purgatory". Also during his time at Oxford Brown explored the influence of French and German philosophy on Christian doctrine, the conclusions of which were published in Continental Philosophy and Modern Theology (1987).

After moving to Durham, and partly through the influence of his new colleague Ann Loades, Brown's research and teaching broadened to include sacramental theology and the relationship between theology and the arts. These interests gradually coalesced into five major volumes with Oxford University Press. The first two—Tradition and Imagination (1999) and Discipleship and Imagination (2000)—defended a positive understanding of developing tradition in Christianity and other religions as a vehicle of progressive divine revelation and a necessary creative response of human imagination. The following three—God and Enchantment of Place (2004), God and Grace of Body (2007), and God and Mystery in Words (2008)—defended an expansive account of sacramentality and religious experience mediated through natural and built environments, painting, bodies, food and drink, music, literature, and drama. According to Brown, the "fundamental thesis" underlying all five volumes is that "both natural and revealed theology are in crisis, and that the only way out is to give proper attention to the cultural embeddedness of both." He also sought to reclaim and revitalize the category of "natural religion" in contrast to traditional "natural theology". And yet, at the same time, he presented the Incarnation of God in the human person Jesus as the lens through which all of these issues are ultimately best understood.

In a volume of essays engaging specifically with these books, co-editor Robert MacSwain wrote that the five volumes inaugurated by Tradition and Imagination "present many detailed arguments across a vast canvas through a sophisticated blend of philosophy, theology, biblical studies, classical studies, church history, comparative religion, comparative literature, and a wide range of other disciplines and cultural studies, particularly those related to the fine and performing arts, up to and including pop culture in its various manifestations and media. The primarily analytic and empirical approach of The Divine Trinity was not totally abandoned, but has now been thoroughly integrated into a much deeper and richer context, one that more faithfully represents the genuine complexity of the Christian tradition and which is thus more fruitful in interpreting, assessing, and defending it."

A Scottish Episcopalian initially ordained in the Church of England, Brown belongs to the Anglo-Catholic tradition that developed out of the 19th century Oxford Movement, and has written studies of Anglican figures such as Joseph Butler, John Henry Newman, Edward Bouverie Pusey, Austin Farrer, and Michael Ramsey.

Brown's perspective has been described as a "Critical Catholicism": "instead of seeking to go beyond (or around) 'secular' reason, it accepts native British empirical standards in both philosophy and history, does not object to metaphysics and natural theology in principle, sees special revelation as building upon general revelation, and rather than isolating Christian faith in a protected world of its own seeks to integrate it fully with what is known in other fields of human inquiry. At the same time, such 'Critical Catholicism' takes seriously the basic contours of Nicene Christianity and works as much as possible within those parameters, adjusting them only when it seems absolutely necessary in light of new knowledge."

== Selected publications ==
=== Major texts ===
- The Divine Trinity (Duckworth and Open Court, 1985; Wipf and Stock, 2012) ISBN 9781610977500
- Continental Philosophy and Modern Theology: An Engagement (Blackwell, 1987) Wipf and Stock: ISBN 9781610977494
- Tradition and Imagination: Revelation and Change (Oxford, 1999) ISBN 9780199275915
- Discipleship and Imagination: Christian Tradition and Truth (Oxford, 2000) ISBN 9780199275908
- God and Enchantment of Place: Reclaiming Human Experience (Oxford, 2004) ISBN 9780199271986
- God and Grace of Body: Sacrament in Ordinary (Oxford, 2007) ISBN 9780199231829
- God and Mystery in Words: Experience through Metaphor and Drama (Oxford, 2008).
- La tradition kénotique dans la théologie britannique (Mame-Desclée, Paris, 2010) ISBN 9782718909998
  - United Kingdom as Divine Humanity: Kenosis Explored and Defended (SCM, 2011) ISBN 9780334043805
  - United States as Divine Humanity: Kenosis and the Construction of a Christian Theology (Baylor, 2011) ISBN 9781602584556
  - Excerpt translated into German by Benjamin Dahlke as "Der wahrer Mensch: Zum Aktualität der kenotischen Christologie," in Catholicia 67 (2013): 72–80.
- The Extravagance of Music (Palgrave Macmillan, 2018), co-authored with Gavin Hopps ISBN 9783319918174
- Learning from Other Religions (Cambridge, 2024) ISBN 9781009367707
- Gospel as Work of Art: Imaginative Truth and the Open Text (Eerdmans, 2024) ISBN 9780802882820

=== Essay collections ===
- God in a Single Vision: Integrating Philosophy and Theology, edited by Christopher R. Brewer and Robert MacSwain (Routledge, 2016)—selected essays in philosophical theology.
- Divine Generosity and Human Creativity: Theology Through Symbol, Painting, and Architecture, edited by Christopher R. Brewer and Robert MacSwain (Routledge, 2017)—selected essays in theology and the arts.

=== Introductory texts ===
- Choices: Ethics and the Christian (Blackwell, 1983) ISBN 9780631131823
- Invitation to Theology (Blackwell, 1989) ISBN 9780631164746
- Signs of Grace: The Sacraments in Poetry and Prose (Cassell and Morehouse, 1995), co-authored with David Fuller ISBN 9780819216540

=== Sermon collections ===
- The Word to Set You Free: Living Faith and Biblical Criticism (SPCK, 1995).
- Through the Eyes of the Saints: A Pilgrimage through History (Continuum, 2005) ISBN 9780826476401

=== Primary edited volumes ===
- Newman: A Man for Our Time: Centenary Essays (SPCK, 1990) ISBN 9780281044863
- The Sense of the Sacramental: Movement and Measure in Art and Music, Place and Time (SPCK, 1995), co-edited with Ann Loades. ISBN 9780281048496
- Christ: The Sacramental Word: Incarnation, Sacrament and Poetry (SPCK, 1996), co-edited with Ann Loades. ISBN 9780281049295
- Durham Cathedral: History, Fabric and Culture (Yale, 2015). ISBN 9780300208184

=== Engagements with Brown's work ===
- Theology, Aesthetics, and Culture: Responses to the Work of David Brown, edited by Robert MacSwain and Taylor Worley (Oxford, 2012). ISBN 9780199646821
- The Moving Text: Interdisciplinary Perspectives on David Brown and the Bible, edited by Garrick V. Allen, Christopher R. Brewer, and Denny Kinlaw (SCM, 2018). ISBN 9780334055266
- Christian Theology and the Transformation of Natural Religion: From Incarnation to Sacramentality—Essays in Honour of David Brown, edited by Christopher R. Brewer (Peeters, 2018). ISBN 9789042936393
- International Journal for the Study of the Christian Church, Volume 20, Number 1, 2020--an issue focused on Brown and Hopps's volume The Extravagance of Music with contributions by David Brown, Christoph Schwöbel, Heidi Epstein, Antonio Eduardo Alonso, Kutter Callaway, and Gavin Hopps.
- In 2022 Brown's life and work was the focus of a short film, "The Greater Part", gathered along with similar films engaging with five other theologians on the webpage At the Threshold and available at https://atthethreshold.com.
