= Ian Ramsey =

British Anglican bishop and academic (1915–1972)

The Right Reverend Ian Ramsey
- Bishop of Durham
- Ramsey robed as a bishop
- Diocese: Diocese of Durham
- In office: 1966–1972
- Predecessor: Maurice Harland
- Successor: John Habgood
- Other posts: Chaplain, Christ's College, Cambridge (1943–1949); Nolloth Professor of the Philosophy of the Christian Religion (1951–1966); Chaplain & Sub-Prelate, Order of St John (1969–?)

Orders
- Ordination: 1940 (deacon) c. 1941 (priest)
- Consecration: 1 November 1966, York Minster

Personal details
- Born: 31 January 1915 Kearsley, Lancashire, United Kingdom
- Died: 6 October 1972 (aged 57) Marylebone, Greater London, UK
- Buried: Auckland Castle (ashes)
- Denomination: Anglican
- Residence: Auckland Castle (as Bishop of Durham)
- Parents: Arthur & Mary
- Spouse: Margretta née McKay (m. 1943)
- Children: 2 sons
- Profession: scholar: philosophy of religion, science and religion, theology
- Education: Christ's College, Cambridge

Ian Thomas Ramsey (31 January 1915 – 6 October 1972) was a British Anglican bishop and academic. He was Professor of the Philosophy of Religion at the University of Oxford, and Bishop of Durham from 1966 until his death in 1972. He wrote extensively on the problem of religious language, Christian ethics, the relationship between science and religion, and Christian apologetics. As a result, he became convinced that a permanent centre was needed for enquiry into these inter-disciplinary areas; and in 1985 the Ian Ramsey Centre for Science and Religion at the University of Oxford was set up to promote discussion on the problems raised for theology and ethics by developments in science, technology and medicine.

== Early life and education ==
Ramsey was born in Kearsley, near Bolton, Lancashire, an area noted for small industries and factories. He was the sole child born to Arthur (a postman) and Mary Ramsey, and was raised by them in the Christian faith. He attended primary school at St John's Church in Farnworth, Bolton, and then proceeded on a scholarship to Farnworth Grammar School, where he studied Latin, mathematics, physics and chemistry. He won a scholarship in 1934 that enabled him to embark on further study at Christ's College, Cambridge, where he graduated with a triple first-class MA degree in mathematics, moral sciences (philosophy) and theology in 1939. At Cambridge, he was influenced by Charles E. Raven (Regius Professor of Divinity) and A. C. Ewing. Raven spurred Ramsey's interests in the relationship between science and religion, while Ewing guided him into studying metaphysics.

After graduating from Cambridge, Ramsey then enrolled as candidate for ordination in the Church of England at Ripon Hall, near Oxford, and began his theological studies there. During his studies he served as an assistant curate at Headington Quarry and it was there that he met his wife Margretta McKay (called Margaret; whom he married in 1943). In 1943, upon completing his theological degree and ordination Ramsey then took on the role of Chaplain at Christ's College, Cambridge. He was elected as a Fellow and Director of Studies in theology and moral science in 1944. It was also in 1944 that he was appointed as university lecturer in divinity and Canon Theologian at Leicester Cathedral. He held the latter role alongside his main posts until 1966 when he was elected the Bishop of Durham. His first doctorate was an honorary Doctorate of Divinity (Hon DD) from Oxford, awarded in 1966.

== Career ==
Alongside of his role as a chaplain, Ramsey became widely known at Cambridge in the 1940s for his lectures in philosophical theology. In 1951 he accepted the chair of Nolloth Professor of the Philosophy of the Christian Religion at Oxford University. His inaugural lecture was delivered on 7 December 1951 and published as Miracles: An Exercise in Logical Map Work. He served as a Fellow of Oriel College at Oxford and as chairman of the faculty of theology. During his tenure at Oxford Ramsey was invited to deliver various guest lecture series including the Forwood Lectures at the University of Liverpool (1957), annual theological lecture at Queen's University, Belfast (1960), the Frederick Denison Maurice Lectures at King's College, London University (1961–62), Whidden Lecturer at McMaster University in Canada (1963), Riddell Memorial Lecture at the University of Newcastle upon Tyne (1963), and the Zenos Lectures at McCormick Theological Seminary, Chicago (1966). Most of these lecture series were subsequently published as books: Freedom and Immortality, Religion and Science, On Being Sure in Religion, Models and Mystery, and Christian Discourse.

Ramsey was an authority on the Christian apologetics work of both Joseph Butler, and of John Locke. He wrote a study of Butler's life and apologetic arguments that was published in 1969. Ramsey also wrote a critical introduction to an abridged edition of Locke's The Reasonableness of Christianity that was released in 1958. Both Locke's and Butler's texts were critical apologetic works that addressed the religious skepticism held to by various Deist thinkers in the late seventeenth century and eighteenth century.

As well as his duties as a college administrator and lecturer, Ramsey was also very active as a churchman. He served as the examining chaplain to the bishops of Portsmouth, Sheffield and Norwich, and acted as the director of the Lambeth Diploma in Theology designed for non-clergy students interested in theology. He also served on various Church of England commissions inquiring into ethical questions about birth control, suicide, and on the subject of divine healing. He wrote reports dealing with those topics for the church's Board for Social Responsibility. On 15 December 1966, he was installed at Durham Cathedral as the ninetieth Bishop of Durham – his enthronement was commented on as unusual since the cathedral doors were open to welcome him.

He chaired the Commission on Religious Education in Schools which reported for the centenary of the Education Act of 1870. He became chairman of the BBC's Central Religious Advisory Committee (CRAC) in 1970. At Easter in 1972 he had a heart attack brought on by overwork and died on 6 October 1972 after having a meeting at Broadcasting House, London with CRAC.

== Theological contributions ==
Ramsey approached a number of philosophical problems concerning twentieth century theology. One of the significant topics concerned "God-talk" or the soundness of theological language. Much of this had been prompted by the philosophical writings of Ludwig Wittgenstein and also by philosophers such as Alfred Ayer who were involved in the mid-twentieth century movement known as Logical Positivism. The implications of Ayer's argument in Language, Truth and Logic (1936) were that religious or theological language was deemed to be analytically unscientific. Religious statements were considered to be technically meaningless as it was argued that claims such as "God exists" were observationally unverifiable.

Ramsey was concerned in his writings to argue that traditional theological language was empirically meaningful. He was equipped to make this argument because his thinking closely paralleled that of Wittgenstein.

=== Theology grounded in mystery ===
For Ramsey, theological language is grounded in "permanent mystery". He distinguishes this "permanent mystery" from the kind of mystery that can solved by facts and information. Permanent mystery cannot be eradicated. It is not "mystery" used as "a synonym for ignorance".

In his emphasis on mystery, Ramsey drew on Ludwig Wittgenstein. For example, Ramsey distinguished between the "thatness" and the "whatness" of an event. This distinction parallels Wittgenstein's proposition, "not how the world is, is the mystical [mystery], but that it is". The mystery of what happens can be solved by sufficient information, but, for Ramsey, the mystery that its happens is permanent. Given his position that theology is grounded in permanent mystery, Ramsey holds that language about God (theo-logy) should never be viewed as "a super-science" that explains phenomena. Rather than treating language about God as explanatory, Ramsey characterizes talk about God (theology) as "an attempt to be articulate about the divine mystery".

=== Two languages ===
In his Religious Language, Ramsey differentiates two kinds of language. He denotes one kind variously as "observational language", "ordinary language", "straightforward language", or "straightforward public language". To simplify, this first kind of language can be called "ordinary language". Ramsey calls the other kind of language "religious language", the language of theology. He cautions that religious language will be "logically odd" because "God" is "a word outside ordinary language". Thus, even though religious language is "grammatically simple", its "logical structure" is neither plain nor straightforward. The challenge for religious language, in Ramsey's estimation, is how to make "ordinary language" into a "suitable currency" for the "religious language" of theology without its being misread as straightforward language.

Ramsey tried to prevent misreading "religious language" as "ordinary language" by pointing up the logically odd "qualifiers" to the ordinary language of "disclosure models" (aka "analogue models") by which religious language speaks of God. One of Ramsey's examples is the disclosure model "First Cause". When "God" is predicated by active verbs, if the language were "ordinary language", the word "God" would refer to a causal agent. But, for Ramsey, the disclosure model "First Cause" does not mean that God is a causal agent. Rather, if one traces the empirical whatness of a "causal chain", the permanent mystery that such causation exists might dawn on a person, or in an image Ramsey used, "the penny drops". Disclosure models are grounded on the empirical what, in this example, causation. This is the "empirical fit" Ramsey emphasised. At the same time, disclosure models "point to mystery", in this example, the mystery that causation exists. Thus, for Ramsey the religious language of theology names the permanent mystery "God" and by a disclosure model speaks of God as "First Cause". The qualifiers "First" and the capitalizations signify religious language.

Ramsey's understanding of theological language has been applied to the biblical story of Hannah in 1 Samuel 1:2-5, 19. The disclosure situation was that "Hannah had no children" because of unstated empirical causes, but the permanent mystery that the causes happened was named "the Lord" and was modelled with an "empirical fit" as having "closed Hannah’s womb". When Hannah became pregnant, the mystery that it happened was again named "the Lord". This time the Lord was modelled with an "empirical fit" as having "remembered Hannah" (I Samuel 1:19) to fit the new disclosure situation. Ramsey reconciled such conflicting disclosure models by tracing them back to the what of the disclosure situations.

=== Grounded in personal experience ===
Ramsey's arguments were developed on a model of religious language grounded in personal experience and personal disclosure. As humans communicate with each other personal disclosure occurs. Ramsey used this point to argue that humans come to encounter God also by way of personal disclosure, thus offering an argument from analogy. Ramsey's theological work thus re-emphasized the traditional theological view that all religious language is analogical, and the religious words that humans create are always involving the language of analogy.

He was particularly effective in communicating with experts from a wide range of disciplines, inspiring them to work together on the problems raised for theology and ethics by developments in science, technology and medicine. As a result of his experience he became convinced that a permanent centre was needed for enquiry into these interdisciplinary areas, and it was in response to this that the Ian Ramsey Centre for the study of religious beliefs in relation to the sciences and medicine was set up in 1985 in the University of Oxford.

Bishop Ian Ramsey Primary School in Consett, County Durham, Ian Ramsey Church of England Academy in Fairfield, Stockton-on-Tees and Bishop Ramsey Church of England Secondary School in Ruislip in the London Borough of Hillingdon are also named after him.

== Styles and titles ==
- 1940–1944: The Reverend Ian Ramsey
- 1944–1966: The Reverend Canon Ian Ramsey (in church contexts, 1951–1966)
- 1951–1966: The Reverend Professor Ian Ramsey (in academic contexts)
- 1966–1972: The Right Reverend Doctor Ian Ramsey*

* As a bishop, Ramsey was/is routinely called/referred to as "Dr Ramsey" despite holding only an honorary doctorate.

== Bibliography ==
- Biology and Personality: Frontier Problems in Science, Philosophy and Religion (Oxford: Blackwell, 1965/New York: Barnes & Noble, 1966).
- Christian Discourse: Some Logical Explorations (London & New York: Oxford University Press, 1965).
- Christian Empiricism (edited by Jerry H. Gill), (London: Sheldon Press, 1974; Grand Rapids, Michigan: William B. Eerdmans, 1974). ISBN 0-85969-011-3 (UK), ISBN 0-8028-1558-8 (US)
- Christian Ethics and Contemporary Philosophy (London: SCM Press/New York: MacMillan, 1966).
- Freedom and Immortality (London: SCM Press, 1960).
- Joseph Butler 1692–1752, author of The Analogy of Religion: Some Features of His Life and Thought (London: Dr William's Trust, 1969).
- Models and Mystery (London & New York: Oxford University Press, 1964).
- Miracles: An Exercise in Logical Map Work (Oxford: Clarendon Press, 1952).
- Models for Divine Activity (London: SCM Press, 1973).
- On Being Sure in Religion (London: University of London, Athlone Press, 1963).
- Our Understanding of Prayer (London: SPCK, 1971).
- Personality and Science (co-edited with Ruth Porter) (Edinburgh: Churchill Livingstone, 1971). ISBN 0-7000-1540-X
- Prospect for Metaphysics (London: Allen & Unwin/New York: Philosophical Library, 1961).
- Religion and Science: Conflict and Synthesis (London: SPCK, 1964).
- Religious Language: An Empirical Placing of Theological Phrases (London: SCM Press, 1957).
- The Fourth R The Report of the Commission on Religious Education in Schools (London: National Society/SPCK 1970)
- The Improbable Bishop: Ian Ramsey of Durham (The Memoir Club, 2010). ISBN 978-1-84104-511-5.
- Words About God (London: SCM Press, 1971). ISBN 0-334-01383-6.
- edited, John Locke, The Reasonableness of Christianity (London: Adam & Charles Black/Stanford: Stanford University Press, 1958).
- contributor, Collier's Encyclopedia (Crowell Collier and Macmillan, Inc. 1966).

== See also ==
- List of science and religion scholars

== Sources ==
- "Ramsey, Ian Thomas". Oxford Dictionary of National Biography (online ed.). Oxford University Press. doi:10.1093/ref:odnb/31583. (Subscription, Wikipedia Library access or UK public library membership required.)
- Darlington & Stockton Times, 11 February 2011 – A bishop for everyone – but improbably so

Academic offices
| Preceded by Laurence Grensted | Nolloth Professor of the Philosophy of the Christian Religion; 1951–1966 | Succeeded by Basil Mitchell |
Church of England titles
| Preceded by Maurice Harland | Bishop of Durham; 1966–1972 | Succeeded by John Habgood |
