= Herman Philipse =

Dutch professor of philosophy

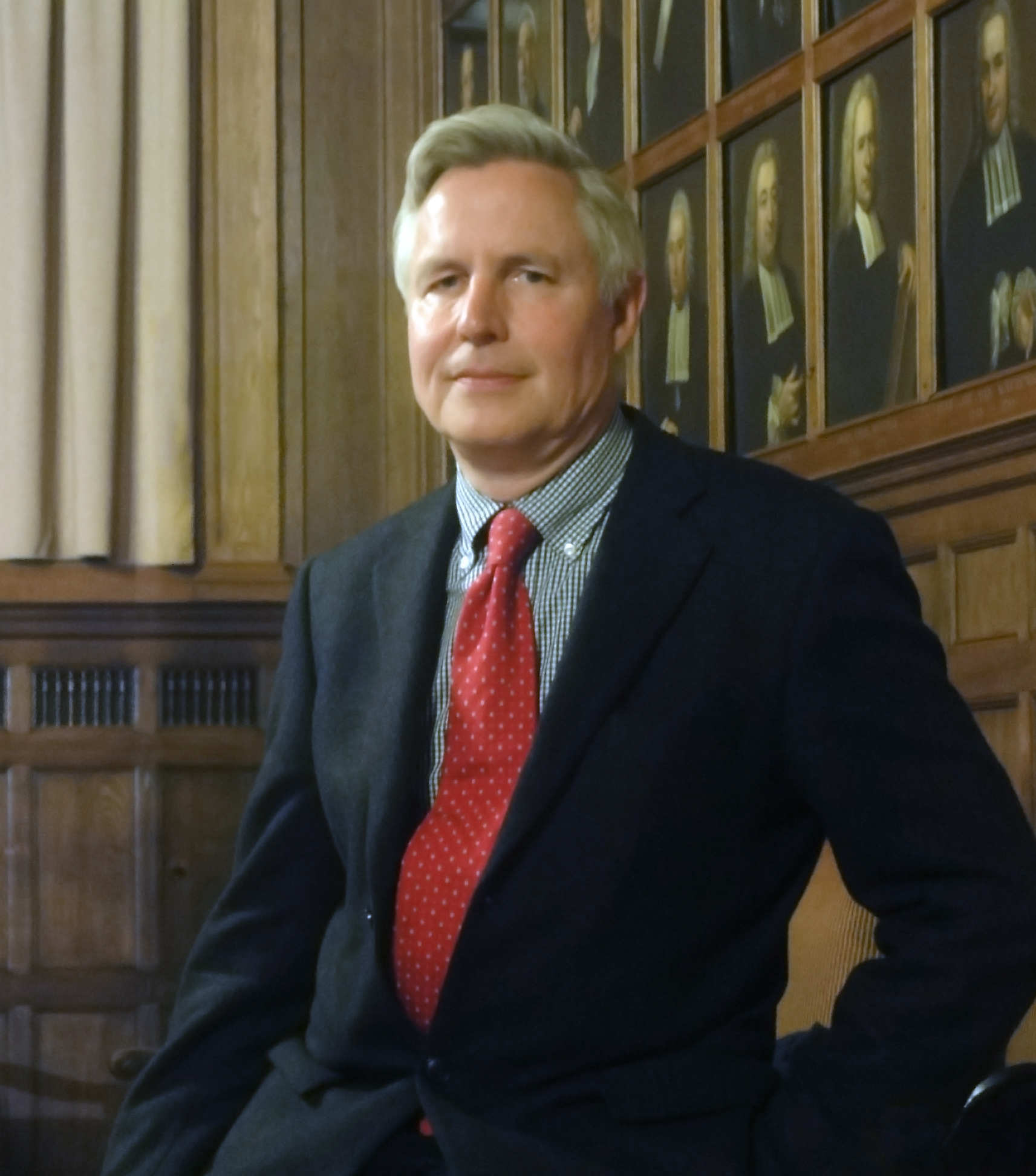
- At the Studium Generale of Utrecht University, 2012
- Born: 13 May 1951 (age 75); The Hague, Netherlands
- Education: Leiden University
- Occupation: Professor of philosophy
- Years active: 1986–present
- Employer: Utrecht University
- Website: www.uu.nl/staff/HPhilipse

Herman Philipse (born 13 May 1951) is a Dutch professor of philosophy at Utrecht University in the Netherlands. Philipse taught at Leiden University from 1986 until 2003 where he obtained his doctorate in 1983.

== Work ==
Philipse has written many philosophical works in Dutch, including books on Husserl's early philosophy of logic, the role of certainty in Descartes' moral theory, and a widely read Atheist Manifesto (1995, 2004). In English, he has written over a dozen articles in philosophical journals, as well as a detailed assessment of Heidegger, Heidegger's Philosophy of Being: A Critical Interpretation. He has also written many commentaries for Dutch newspapers (most frequently as a regular contributor to the NRC Handelsblad) and current events television programs, defending atheism and advocating cultural assimilation for non-European immigrants in the Netherlands.

In his philosophical work, Philipse defends a non-reductionist naturalism, akin to that of Gilbert Ryle, Peter Strawson, and P.M.S. Hacker. While highly critical of the transcendental idealist tradition of Kant and Husserl for its incoherent notion of conceptual schemes, Philipse argues that scientistic philosophies that attempt to reduce consciousness to purely physical descriptions (such as those of Quine and Churchland) fall victim to a similar inconsistency: their theories logically depend on the concepts of ordinary human life they would abolish. More generally, Philipse firmly defends the values of the Enlightenment: support for the natural sciences and political liberalism.

In 2012, he published God in the Age of Science. A Critique of Religious Reason.

During 2014-2019, Philipse presided a research programme on “Evolutionary Ethics: The (Meta-)Ethical Implications of Evolutionary Theory”, financed by the Dutch Research Council (NWO, Dutch: Nederlandse Organisatie voor Wetenschappelijk Onderzoek).

== Selected bibliography ==
Works by Herman Philipse include:

- Philipse, Herman (1995). Atheïstisch manifest: drie wijsgerige opstellen over godsdienst en moraal. Prometheus. ISBN 90-5333-380-0.
- Philipse, Herman (1998). Heidegger's Philosophy of Being: A Critical Interpretation. Princeton University Press. ISBN 978-0-691-00119-7.
- Philipse, Herman (2004). Atheïstisch manifest en De onredelijkheid van religie. Uitgeverij Prometheus. ISBN 978-90-351-2654-1.
- Philipse, Herman (2004). Acht Filosofische Miniaturen - Een hoorcollege over grote denkers van Plato tot Wittgenstein. Home Academy Publishers (audio-cd). ISBN 978-90-8530-003-8.
- Philipse, Herman (2005). Filosofen van de 20e eeuw - Een hoorcollege over acht moderne denkers. Home Academy Publishers (audio-cd). ISBN 978-90-8530-014-4.
- Philipse, Herman (2006). Godsdienstfilosofie - Een hoorcollege over religie tussen wonder en wetenschap. Home Academy Publishers (audio-cd). ISBN 978-90-8530-050-2.
- Philipse, Herman (2007). Wetenschap versus godsdienst - Een hoorcollege over grote conflicten, van Copernicus tot Dawkins. Home Academy Publishers (audio-cd). ISBN 978-90-8530-203-2.
- Philipse, Herman (2008). Ethiek en Evolutie - Een hoorcollege over de geschiedenis, biologie, filosofie en antropologie van de moraal. Home Academy Publishers (audio-cd). ISBN 978-90-8530-403-6.
- Philipse, Herman (2009). Godsgeloof of atheïsme? Een hoorcollege over de filosofische strijd der wereldbeschouwingen. Home Academy Publishers (audio-cd). ISBN 978-90-8530-056-4.
- Philipse, Herman (2009). Filosofische polemieken. Uitgeverij Bert Bakker. ISBN 978-90-351-3502-4.
- Philipse, Herman (2010). Betrouwbare kennis - Een hoorcollege over wetenschapsfilosofie in historisch perspectief. Home Academy Publishers (audio-cd). ISBN 978-90-8530-930-7.
- Philipse, Herman (2011). Vrijheid en verplichting - Een hoorcollege over wijsgerige ethiek, van Plato tot Levinas. Home Academy Publishers (audio-cd). ISBN 978-90-8530-100-4.
- Philipse, Herman (2012). God in the Age of Science?: A Critique of Religious Reason. Oxford University Press. ISBN 978-0-19-969753-3.
- Philipse, Herman (2022). Reason and Religion: Evaluating and Explaining Belief in Gods. Cambridge University Press. ISBN 978-13-1667-661-5.

== See also ==
- Dirk Verhofstadt
- Etienne Vermeersch
- Floris van den Berg
