= Society for the Study of Christian Ethics =

Academic society in the UK

The Society for the Study of Christian Ethics (SSCE) is an academic society in the United Kingdom for scholars and practitioners whose work relates to theological ethics and the fields of ethics, politics, religion, philosophy, theology, and public life. It is a not-for-profit member association, serving as a professional and learned society for scholars involved in the academic study of Christian ethics. It draws members principally from across the UK but also Europe, Asia, and the Americas.

The SSCE hosts an annual conference every September and a postgraduate conference every April/May. The SSCE has its own journal, Studies in Christian Ethics, published by SAGE Publications.
