= Richard Swinburne =

English philosopher and Christian apologist (born 1934)

Richard Swinburne FBA
- Swinburne in 2009
- Born: Richard Granville Swinburne; 26 December 1934 (age 91); Smethwick, Staffordshire, England

Education
- Education: Exeter College, Oxford
- Academic advisor: J. L. Austin

Philosophical work
- Era: Contemporary philosophy
- Region: Western philosophy
- School: Analytic philosophy Analytic theology
- Institutions: University of Hull; University of Keele; Oriel College, Oxford
- Doctoral students: J. L. Schellenberg; Mark Wynn
- Main interests: Philosophy of religion Philosophical theology Philosophy of science Christian apologetics
- Notable ideas: Theistic Bayesian arguments

Richard Granville Swinburne (/ˈswɪnbɜːrn/; born 26 December 1934) is an English philosopher. He is an Emeritus Professor of Philosophy at the University of Oxford. Over the last 50 years, Swinburne has been a proponent of philosophical arguments for the existence of God. His philosophical contributions are primarily in the philosophy of religion and philosophy of science. He aroused much discussion with his early work in the philosophy of religion, a trilogy of books consisting of The Coherence of Theism, The Existence of God, and Faith and Reason. He has been influential in reviving substance dualism as an option in philosophy of mind.

== Early life ==
Richard Granville Swinburne was born in Smethwick, Staffordshire, England, on 26 December 1934. His father was a school music teacher, who was the son of an off-licence owner in Shoreditch. His mother was a secretary, the daughter of an optician. He is an only child. Swinburne attended a preparatory school and then Charterhouse School.

== Academic career ==
Swinburne received an open scholarship to study Classics at Exeter College, Oxford, but ultimately graduated with a first-class Bachelor of Arts degree in Philosophy, Politics and Economics. Swinburne has held various professorships throughout his career in academia. From 1972 to 1985, he taught at Keele University. During part of this time, he gave the Gifford lectures at Aberdeen from 1982 to 1984, resulting in the book The Evolution of the Soul. From 1985 until his retirement in 2002, he was Nolloth Professor of the Philosophy of the Christian Religion at the University of Oxford (his successor to this chair was Brian Leftow). He has continued to publish regularly since his retirement.

Swinburne has been an active author throughout his career, producing a major book every two to three years. He has played a role in the recent debate over the mind–body problem, defending a substance dualism that recalls the work of René Descartes in important respects (see The Evolution of the Soul, 1997).

His books are primarily very technical works of academic philosophy, but he has written at the popular level as well. Of the non-technical works, his Is There a God? (1996), summarising for a non-specialist audience many of his arguments for the existence of God and plausibility in the belief of that existence, is probably the most popular and is available in 22 languages.

In 1992 he was elected a Fellow of the British Academy. He is a recipient of a James Joyce Award from the Literary and Historical Society of University College Dublin. Also, he was awarded honorary doctorates by the Catholic University of Lublin (2015), Dimitrie Cantemir Christian University in Bucharest (2016), the International Academy of Philosophy in Liechtenstein (2017), and New Georgian University in Poti (2023).

== Christian apologetics ==
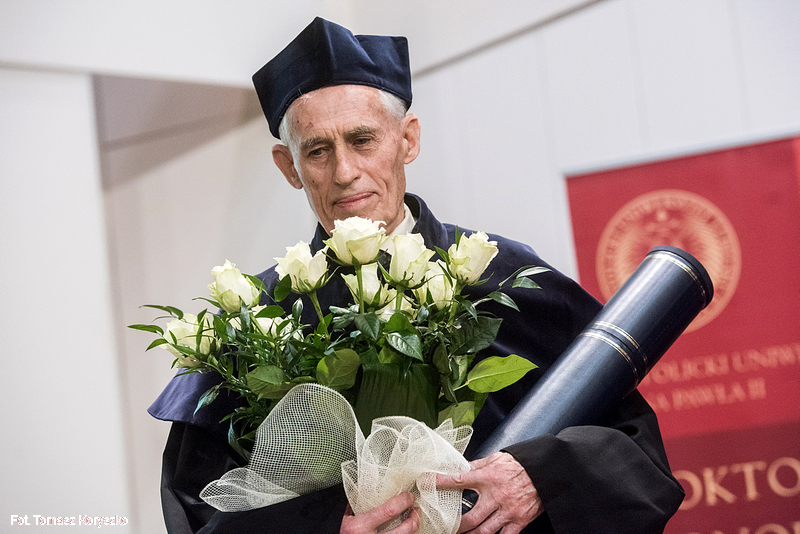
Swinburne in 2015

A member of the Orthodox Church, Swinburne is noted as one of the foremost Christian apologists, arguing in his many articles and books that faith in Christianity is rational and coherent in a rigorous philosophical sense. William Hasker writes that his "tetralogy on Christian doctrine, together with his earlier trilogy on the philosophy of theism, is one of the most important apologetic projects of recent times." While Swinburne presents many arguments to advance the belief that God exists, he argues that God is a being whose existence is not logically necessary (see modal logic) but metaphysically necessary in a way he defines in his The Christian God. Other subjects on which Swinburne writes include personal identity (in which he espouses a view based on the concept of a soul), and epistemic justification. He has written in defence of Cartesian dualism and libertarian free will.

Although he is best known for his vigorous defence of Christian intellectual commitments, he also has a theory of the nature of passionate faith which is developed in his book Faith and Reason.

According to an interview Swinburne did with Foma magazine, he converted from Anglicanism (Church of England) to Eastern Orthodoxy around 1996:

I don't think I changed my beliefs in any significant way. I always believed in the Apostolic succession: that the Church has to have its authority dating back to the Apostles, and the general teaching of the Orthodox Church on the saints and the prayers for the departed and so on, these things I have always believed.

Swinburne's philosophical method reflects the influence of Thomas Aquinas. He admits that he draws from Aquinas a systematic approach to philosophical theology. Swinburne, like Aquinas, moves from basic philosophical issues (for example, the question of the possibility that God may exist in Swinburne's The Coherence of Theism), to more specific Christian beliefs (for example, the claim in Swinburne's Revelation that God has communicated to human beings propositionally in Jesus Christ).

In his 2003 book The Resurrection of God Incarnate, Richard Swinburne presents a probabilistic argument concluding that the evidence makes it highly likely that Jesus was God incarnate who rose from the dead.

In an interview with Veery journal, Swinburne summed up his place in philosophy: "I'm very much in the modern Anglo-American tradition of philosophy which I believe is basically the tradition of philosophy since Plato."

Swinburne moves in his writing program from the philosophical to the theological, building his case and relying on his previous arguments as he defends particular Christian beliefs. He has attempted to reassert classical Christian beliefs with an apologetic method that he believes is compatible with contemporary science. That method relies heavily on inductive logic, seeking to show that his Christian beliefs fit best with the evidence.

National Life Stories conducted an oral history interview (C1672/15) with Richard Swinburne in 2015–2016 for its Science and Religion collection held by the British Library.

== Major books ==
- Space and Time, 1968
- The Concept of Miracle, 1970,
- The Coherence of Theism, 1977 (new edition 2016) (part 1 of his trilogy on Theism)
- The Existence of God, 1979 (new edition 2004, ISBN 0-19-927167-4) (part 2 of his trilogy on Theism)
- Faith and Reason, 1981 (new edition 2005). (part 3 of his trilogy on Theism)
- The Evolution of the Soul, 1986, ISBN 0-19-823698-0. (1997 edition online)
- Miracles, 1989
- Responsibility and Atonement, 1989 (part 1 of his tetralogy on Christian Doctrines)
- Revelation, 1991 (part 2 of his tetralogy on Christian Doctrines)
- The Christian God, 1994 (part 3 of his tetralogy on Christian Doctrines)
- Is There a God?, 1996, ISBN 0-19-823545-3; revised edition, 2010, ISBN 978-0-19-958043-9
- Simplicity as Evidence of Truth, The Aquinas Lecture, 1997
- Providence and the Problem of Evil, 1998 (part 4 of his tetralogy on Christian Doctrines)
- Epistemic Justification, 2001
- The Resurrection of God Incarnate, 2003
- Was Jesus God?, 2008
- Free Will and Modern Science, Ed. 2011, ISBN 978-0197264898
- Mind, Brain, and Free Will, 2013
- Are We Bodies or Souls?, 2019, ISBN 978-0-19-883149-5

=== Spiritual autobiographies ===
- Richard Swinburne, "Natural Theology and Orthodoxy," in Turning East: Contemporary Philosophers and the Ancient Christian Faith, Rico Vitz, ed. (St. Vladimir's Seminary Press, 2012), pp. 47–78.
- Richard Swinburne, "The Vocation of a Natural Theologian," in Philosophers Who Believe, Kelly James Clark, ed. (Downers Grove: InterVarsity Press, 1993), pp. 179–202.

Academic offices
Preceded by Basil Mitchell	Nolloth Professor of the Philosophy of the Christian Religion; 1985–2003	Succeeded by Brian Leftow
Preceded by	Gifford Lecturer at the University of Aberdeen; 1982–1984	Succeeded by Freeman Dyson
Professional and academic associations
Preceded by	President of the British Society for the Philosophy of Religion	Succeeded by
