= Vincent Brümmer =

South African philosopher (1932–2021)

Vincent Brümmer (30 December 1932 – 30 March 2021) was a South African-born Christian theologian who worked for most of his career in the Netherlands. From 1967 to 1997 he was the Professor of Philosophy of Religion at the University of Utrecht.

Brummer was born in Stellenbosch. He held degrees from Stellenbosch University, Harvard, and Utrecht University, also working as a research assistant at the University of Oxford for a year (1961-1962). On 27 May 1994 Brümmer received an honorary doctorate from the Faculty of Theology at Uppsala University, Sweden. In 1998, he received an honorary doctorate in divinity from Durham University.

Brümmer died on 30 March 2021, aged 88.
