= Relationship between science and religion =

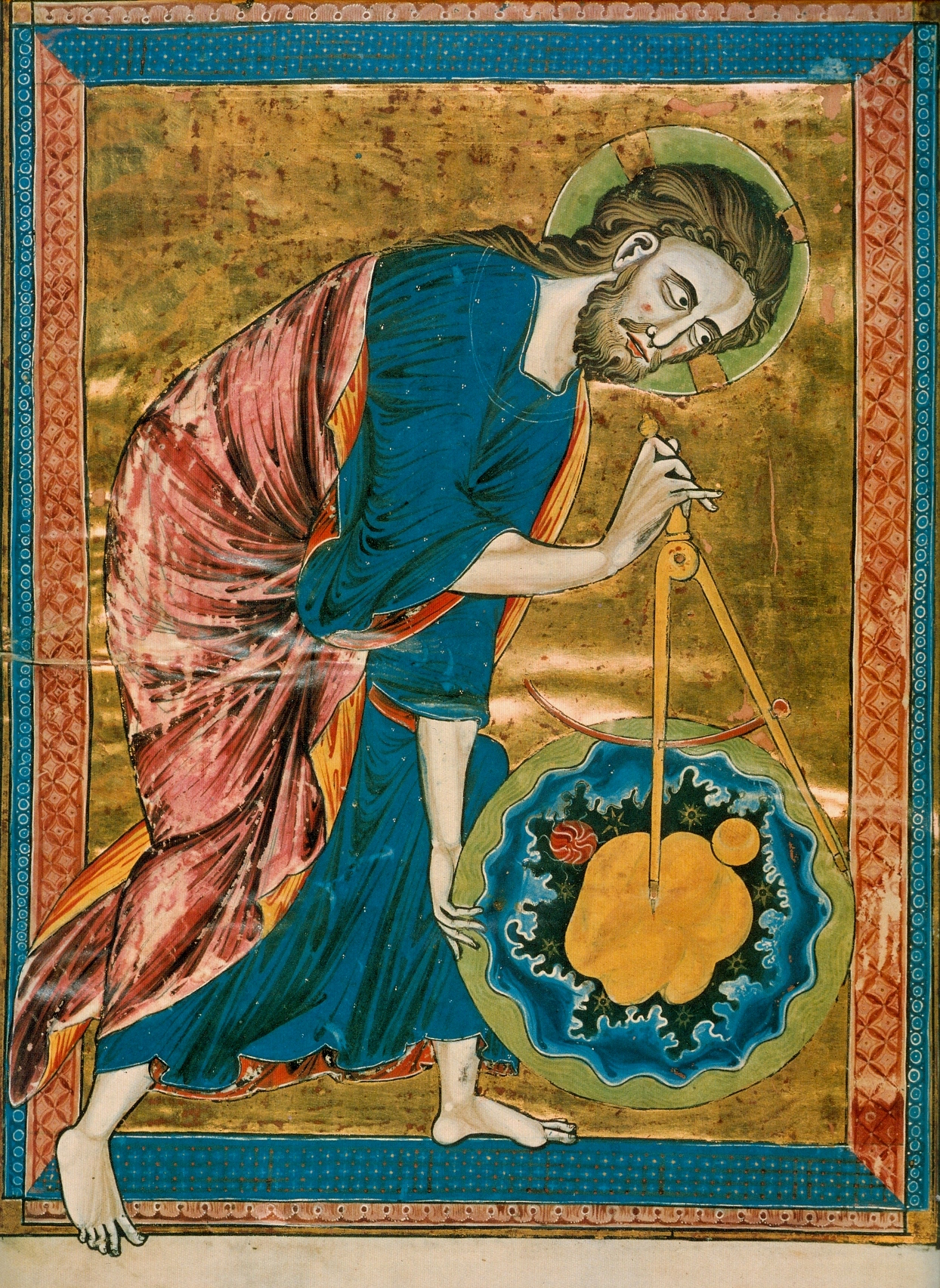
God the Geometer – Gothic frontispiece of the Bible moralisée, representing Christ the God's act of Creation. France, mid-13th century

The relationship between science and religion involves discussions that interconnect the study of the natural world, history, philosophy, and theology. Even though the ancient and medieval worlds did not have conceptions resembling the modern understandings of "science" or of "religion", certain elements of modern ideas on the subject recur throughout history. The pair-structured phrases "religion and science" and "science and religion" first emerged in the literature during the 19th century. This coincided with the refining of "science" (from the studies of "natural philosophy") and of "religion" as distinct concepts in the preceding few centuries—partly due to professionalization of the sciences, the Protestant Reformation, colonization, and globalization. Since then the relationship between science and religion has been characterized in terms of "conflict", "harmony", "complexity", and "mutual independence", among others.

Both science and religion are complex social and cultural endeavors that may vary across cultures and change over time. Most scientific and technical innovations until the Scientific Revolution were achieved by societies organized by religious traditions. Ancient pagan, Islamic, and Christian scholars pioneered individual elements of the scientific method. Roger Bacon, often credited with formalizing the scientific method, was a Franciscan friar, and medieval Christians who studied nature emphasized natural explanations. Confucian thought, whether religious or non-religious in nature, has held different views of science over time. Many 21st-century Buddhists view science as complementary to their beliefs, although the philosophical integrity of such Buddhist modernism has been challenged. While the classification of the material world by the ancient Indians and Greeks into air, earth, fire, and water was more metaphysical, and figures like Anaxagoras questioned certain popular views of Greek divinities, medieval Middle Eastern scholars empirically classified materials.

Events in Europe such as the Galileo affair of the early 17th century, associated with the Scientific Revolution and the Age of Enlightenment, led scholars such as John William Draper to postulate (c. 1874) a conflict thesis, suggesting that religion and science have been in conflict methodologically, factually, and politically throughout history. Some contemporary philosophers and scientists, such as Richard Dawkins, Lawrence Krauss, Peter Atkins, and Donald Prothero subscribe to this thesis; however, such views have not been held by historians of science for a very long time.

Many scientists, philosophers, and theologians throughout history, from Augustine of Hippo to Thomas Aquinas to Francisco Ayala, Kenneth R. Miller, and Francis Collins, have seen compatibility or interdependence between religion and science. Biologist Stephen Jay Gould regarded religion and science as "non-overlapping magisteria", addressing fundamentally separate forms of knowledge and aspects of life. Some historians of science and mathematicians, including John Lennox, Thomas Berry, and Brian Swimme, propose an interconnection between science and religion, while others such as Ian Barbour believe there are even parallels. Public acceptance of scientific facts may sometimes be influenced by religious beliefs such as in the United States, where some reject the concept of evolution by natural selection, especially regarding Human beings. Nevertheless, the American National Academy of Sciences has written that "the evidence for evolution can be fully compatible with religious faith", a view endorsed by many religious denominations.

== History ==
=== Concepts of science and religion ===
The concepts of "science" and "religion" are a recent invention: "religion" emerged in the 17th century in the midst of colonization, globalization and as a consequence of the Protestant reformation. "Science" emerged in the 19th century in the midst of attempts to narrowly define those who studied nature. Originally what is now known as "science" was pioneered as "natural philosophy".

It was in the 19th century that the terms "Buddhism", "Hinduism", "Taoism", "Confucianism" and "World Religions" first emerged. In the ancient and medieval world, the etymological Latin roots of both science (scientia) and religion (religio) were understood as inner qualities of the individual or virtues, never as doctrines, practices, or actual sources of knowledge.

The 19th century also experienced the concept of "science" receiving its modern shape with new titles emerging such as "biology" and "biologist", "physics", and "physicist", among other technical fields and titles; institutions and communities were founded, and unprecedented applications to and interactions with other aspects of society and culture occurred. The term scientist was coined by the naturalist-theologian William Whewell in 1834 and it was applied to those who sought knowledge and understanding of nature. From the ancient world, starting with Aristotle, to the 19th century, the practice of studying nature was commonly referred to as "natural philosophy". Isaac Newton's book Philosophiae Naturalis Principia Mathematica (1687), whose title translates to "Mathematical Principles of Natural Philosophy", reflects the then-current use of the words "natural philosophy", akin to "systematic study of nature". Even in the 19th century, a treatise by Lord Kelvin and Peter Guthrie Tait's, which helped define much of modern physics, was titled Treatise on Natural Philosophy (1867).

It was in the 17th century that the concept of "religion" received its modern shape despite the fact that ancient texts like the Bible, the Quran, and other texts did not have a concept of religion in the original languages and neither did the people or the cultures in which these texts were written. In the 19th century, Max Müller noted that what is called ancient religion today, would have been called "law" in antiquity. For example, there is no precise equivalent of "religion" in Hebrew, and Judaism does not distinguish clearly between religious, national, racial, or ethnic identities. The Sanskrit word "dharma", sometimes translated as "religion", also means law or duty. Throughout classical India, the study of law consisted of concepts such as penance through piety and ceremonial as well as practical traditions. Medieval Japan at first had a similar union between "imperial law" and universal or "Buddha law", but these later became independent sources of power. Throughout its long history, Japan had no concept of "religion" since there was no corresponding Japanese word, nor anything close to its meaning, but when American warships appeared off the coast of Japan in 1853 and forced the Japanese government to sign treaties demanding, among other things, freedom of religion, the country had to contend with this Western idea.

=== Middle Ages and Renaissance ===
The development of sciences (especially natural philosophy) in Western Europe during the Middle Ages, has a considerable foundation in the works of the Arabs who translated Greek and Latin compositions. The works of Aristotle played a major role in the institutionalization, systematization, and expansion of reason. Christianity accepted reason within the ambit of faith. In Christendom, ideas articulated via divine revelation were assumed to be true, and thus via the law of non-contradiction, it was maintained that the natural world must accord with this revealed truth. Any apparent contradiction would indicate either a misunderstanding of the natural world or a misunderstanding of revelation. The prominent scholastic Thomas Aquinas writes in the Summa Theologica concerning apparent contradictions:

"In discussing questions of this kind two rules are to observed, as Augustine teaches (Gen. ad lit. i, 18). The first is, to hold the truth of Scripture without wavering. The second is that since Holy Scripture can be explained in a multiplicity of senses, one should adhere to a particular explanation, only in such measure as to be ready to abandon it, if it be proved with certainty to be false; lest Holy Scripture be exposed to the ridicule of unbelievers, and obstacles be placed to their believing." (Summa 1a, 68, 1)

where the referenced text from Augustine of Hippo reads:

"In matters that are obscure and far beyond our vision, even in such as we may find treated in Holy Scripture, different interpretations are sometimes possible without prejudice to the faith we have received. In such a case, we should not rush in headlong and so firmly take our stand on one side that, if further progress in the search of truth justly undermines this position, we too fall with it. That would be to battle not for the teaching of Holy Scripture but for our own, wishing its teaching to conform to ours, whereas we ought to wish ours to conform to that of Sacred Scripture." (Gen. ad lit. i, 18)

In medieval universities, the faculty for natural philosophy and theology were separate, and discussions pertaining to theological issues were often not allowed to be undertaken by the faculty of philosophy. Natural philosophy, as taught in the arts faculties of the universities, was seen as an essential area of study in its own right and was considered necessary for almost every area of study. It was an independent field, separated from theology, and enjoyed a good deal of intellectual freedom as long as it was restricted to the natural world. In general, there was religious support for natural science by the late Middle Ages and a recognition that it was an important element of learning.

The extent to which medieval science led directly to the new philosophy of the Scientific Revolution remains a subject for debate, but it certainly had a significant influence.

The Middle Ages laid ground for the developments that took place in science, during the Renaissance which immediately succeeded it. By 1630, ancient authority from classical literature and philosophy, as well as their necessity, started eroding, although scientists were still expected to be fluent in Latin, the international language of Europe's intellectuals. With the sheer success of science and the steady advance of rationalism, the individual scientist gained prestige. Along with the inventions of this period, especially the printing press by Johannes Gutenberg, allowing for the dissemination of the Bible in vernacular languages. This allowed more people to read and learn from the scripture, leading to the Evangelical movement. The people who spread this message concentrated more on individual agency rather than the structures of the Church.

==== Medieval Contributors ====
Some medieval contributors to science included: Boethius (c. 477–524), John Philoponus (c. 490–570), Bede the Venerable (c. 672–735), Alcuin of York (c. 735–804), Leo the Mathematician (c. 790–869), Gerbert of Aurillac (c. 946–1003), Constantine the African (c. 1020–1087), Adelard of Bath (c. 1080–1152), Robert Grosseteste (c. 1168–1253), St. Albert the Great (c. 1200–1280), Roger Bacon (c. 1214–1294), William of Ockham (c. 1287–1347), Jean Burdian (c. 1301–1358), Thomas Bradwardine (1300–1349), Nicole Oresme (c. 1320–1382), Nicholas of Cusa (c. 1401–1464).

=== Modern period ===
In the 17th century, founders of the Royal Society largely held conventional and orthodox religious views, and a number of them were prominent Churchmen. While theological issues that had the potential to be divisive were typically excluded from formal discussions of the early Society, many of its fellows nonetheless believed that their scientific activities provided support for traditional religious belief. Clerical involvement in the Royal Society remained high until the mid-nineteenth century when science became more professionalized.

Albert Einstein supported the compatibility of some interpretations of religion with science. In "Science, Philosophy and Religion, A Symposium" published by the Conference on Science, Philosophy and Religion in Their Relation to the Democratic Way of Life, Inc., New York in 1941, Einstein stated:

Accordingly, a religious person is devout in the sense that he has no doubt of the significance and loftiness of those superpersonal objects and goals which neither require nor are capable of rational foundation. They exist with the same necessity and matter-of-factness as he himself. In this sense religion is the age-old endeavor of mankind to become clearly and completely conscious of these values and goals and constantly to strengthen and extend their effect. If one conceives of religion and science according to these definitions then a conflict between them appears impossible. For science can only ascertain what is, but not what should be, and outside of its domain value judgments of all kinds remain necessary. Religion, on the other hand, deals only with evaluations of human thought and action: it cannot justifiably speak of facts and relationships between facts. According to this interpretation the well-known conflicts between religion and science in the past must all be ascribed to a misapprehension of the situation which has been described.

Einstein thus expresses views of ethical non-naturalism (contrasted to ethical naturalism).

Prominent modern scientists who are atheists include evolutionary biologist Richard Dawkins and Nobel Prize–winning physicist Steven Weinberg. Prominent scientists advocating religious belief include Nobel Prize–winning physicist and United Church of Christ member Charles Townes, evangelical Christian and past head of the Human Genome Project Francis Collins, and climatologist John T. Houghton.

== Perspectives ==
The kinds of interactions that might arise between science and religion have been categorized by theologian, Anglican priest, and physicist John Polkinghorne: (1) conflict between the disciplines, (2) independence of the disciplines, (3) dialogue between the disciplines where they overlap and (4) integration of both into one field.

This typology is similar to ones used by theologians Ian Barbour and John Haught. More typologies that categorize this relationship can be found among the works of other science and religion scholars such as theologian and biochemist Arthur Peacocke.

=== Incompatibility ===
"Not only is science corrosive to religion; religion is corrosive to science. It teaches people to be satisfied with trivial, supernatural non-explanations and blinds them to the wonderful real explanations that we have within our grasp. It teaches them to accept authority, revelation and faith instead of always insisting on evidence."—Richard Dawkins

According to Guillermo Paz-y-Miño-C and Avelina Espinosa, the historical conflict between evolution and religion is intrinsic to the incompatibility between scientific rationalism/empiricism and the belief in supernatural causation/faith. According to evolutionary biologist Jerry Coyne, views on evolution and levels of religiosity in some countries, along with the existence of books explaining reconciliation between evolution and religion, indicate that people have trouble in believing both at the same time, thus implying incompatibility. According to physical chemist Peter Atkins, "whereas religion scorns the power of human comprehension, science respects it." Planetary scientist Carolyn Porco describes a hope that "the confrontation between science and formal religion will come to an end when the role played by science in the lives of all people is the same played by religion today." Geologist and paleontologist Donald Prothero has stated that religion is the reason "questions about evolution, the age of the earth, cosmology, and human evolution nearly always cause Americans to flunk science literacy tests compared to other nations." However, Jon Miller, who studies science literacy across nations, states that Americans in general are slightly more scientifically literate than Europeans and the Japanese. According to cosmologist and astrophysicist Lawrence Krauss, compatibility or incompatibility is a theological concern, not a scientific concern. In Lisa Randall's view, questions of incompatibility or otherwise are not answerable, since by accepting revelations one is abandoning rules of logic which are needed to identify if there are indeed contradictions between holding certain beliefs. Daniel Dennett holds that incompatibility exists because religion is not problematic to a certain point before it collapses into a number of excuses for keeping certain beliefs, in light of evolutionary implications.

According to theoretical physicist Steven Weinberg, teaching cosmology and evolution to students should decrease their self-importance in the universe, as well as their religiosity. Evolutionary developmental biologist PZ Myers' view is that all scientists should be atheists, and that science should never accommodate any religious beliefs. Physicist Sean M. Carroll claims that since religion makes claims that are supernatural, both science and religion are incompatible.

Evolutionary biologist Richard Dawkins is openly hostile to religion because he believes it actively debauches the scientific enterprise and education involving science. According to Dawkins, religion "subverts science and saps the intellect". He believes that when science teachers attempt to expound on evolution, there is hostility aimed towards them by parents who are skeptical because they believe it conflicts with their own religious beliefs, and that even in some textbooks have had the word 'evolution' systematically removed. He has worked to argue the negative effects that he believes religion has on education of science.

According to Renny Thomas' study on Indian scientists, atheistic scientists in India called themselves atheists even while accepting that their lifestyle is very much a part of tradition and religion. Thus, they differ from Western atheists in that for them following the lifestyle of a religion is not antithetical to atheism.

==== Criticism ====
Others such as Francis Collins, George F. R. Ellis, Kenneth R. Miller, Katharine Hayhoe, George Coyne and Simon Conway Morris argue for compatibility since they do not agree that science is incompatible with religion and vice versa. They argue that science provides many opportunities to look for and find God in nature and to reflect on their beliefs. According to Kenneth Miller, he disagrees with Jerry Coyne's assessment and argues that since significant portions of scientists are religious and the proportion of Americans believing in evolution is much higher, it implies that both are indeed compatible. Elsewhere, Miller has argued that when scientists make claims on science and theism or atheism, they are not arguing scientifically at all and are stepping beyond the scope of science into discourses of meaning and purpose. What he finds particularly odd and unjustified is in how atheists often come to invoke scientific authority on their non-scientific philosophical conclusions like there being no point or no meaning to the universe as the only viable option when the scientific method and science never have had any way of addressing questions of meaning or God in the first place. Furthermore, he notes that since evolution made the brain and since the brain can handle both religion and science, there is no natural incompatibility between the concepts at the biological level.

Karl Giberson argues that when discussing compatibility, some scientific intellectuals often ignore the viewpoints of intellectual leaders in theology and instead argue against less informed masses, thereby, defining religion by non-intellectuals and slanting the debate unjustly. He argues that leaders in science sometimes trump older scientific baggage and that leaders in theology do the same, so once theological intellectuals are taken into account, people who represent extreme positions like Ken Ham and Eugenie Scott will become irrelevant. Cynthia Tolman notes that religion does not have a method per se partly because religions emerge through time from diverse cultures, but when it comes to Christian theology and ultimate truths, she notes that people often rely on scripture, tradition, reason, and experience to test and gauge what they experience and what they should believe.

==== Conflict thesis ====
The conflict thesis, which holds that religion and science have been in conflict continuously throughout history, was popularized in the 19th century by John William Draper's and Andrew Dickson White's accounts. It was in the 19th century that the relationship between science and religion became an actual formal topic of discourse, while before this no one had pitted science against religion or vice versa, though occasional complex interactions had been expressed before the 19th century. Most contemporary historians of science now reject the conflict thesis in its original form and no longer support it. Instead, it has been superseded by subsequent historical research which has resulted in a more nuanced understanding. Historian of science, Gary Ferngren, has stated: "Although popular images of controversy continue to exemplify the supposed hostility of Christianity to new scientific theories, studies have shown that Christianity has often nurtured and encouraged scientific endeavour, while at other times the two have co-existed without either tension or attempts at harmonization. If Galileo and the Scopes trial come to mind as examples of conflict, they were the exceptions rather than the rule."

Most historians today have moved away from a conflict model, which is based mainly on two historical episodes (Galileo and Darwin), toward compatibility theses (either the integration thesis or non-overlapping magisteria) or toward a "complexity" model, because religious figures were on both sides of each dispute and there was no overall aim by any party involved to discredit religion.

An often cited example of conflict, that has been clarified by historical research in the 20th century, was the Galileo affair, whereby interpretations of the Bible were used to attack ideas by Copernicus on heliocentrism. By 1616 Galileo went to Rome to try to persuade Catholic Church authorities not to ban Copernicus' ideas. In the end, a decree of the Congregation of the Index was issued, declaring that the ideas that the Sun stood still and that the Earth moved were "false" and "altogether contrary to Holy Scripture", and suspending Copernicus's De Revolutionibus until it could be corrected. Galileo was found "vehemently suspect of heresy", namely of having held the opinions that the Sun lies motionless at the center of the universe, that the Earth is not at its centre and moves. He was required to "abjure, curse and detest" those opinions. However, before all this, Pope Urban VIII had personally asked Galileo to give arguments for and against heliocentrism in a book, and to be careful not to advocate heliocentrism as physically proven since the scientific consensus at the time was that the evidence for heliocentrism was very weak. The Church had merely sided with the scientific consensus of the time. Pope Urban VIII asked that his own views on the matter be included in Galileo's book. Only the latter was fulfilled by Galileo. Whether unknowingly or deliberately, Simplicio, the defender of the Aristotelian/Ptolemaic geocentric view in Dialogue Concerning the Two Chief World Systems, was often portrayed as an unlearned fool who lacked mathematical training. Although the preface of his book claims that the character is named after a famous Aristotelian philosopher (Simplicius in Latin, Simplicio in Italian), the name "Simplicio" in Italian also has the connotation of "simpleton". Unfortunately for his relationship with the Pope, Galileo put the words of Urban VIII into the mouth of Simplicio. Most historians agree Galileo did not act out of malice and felt blindsided by the reaction to his book. However, the Pope did not take the suspected public ridicule lightly, nor the physical Copernican advocacy. Galileo had alienated one of his biggest and most powerful supporters, the Pope, and was called to Rome to defend his writings.

The actual evidences that finally proved heliocentrism came centuries after Galileo: the stellar aberration of light by James Bradley in the 18th century, the orbital motions of binary stars by William Herschel in the 19th century, the accurate measurement of the stellar parallax in the 19th century, and Newtonian mechanics in the 17th century. According to physicist Christopher Graney, Galileo's own observations did not actually support the Copernican view, but were more consistent with Tycho Brahe's hybrid model where that Earth did not move and everything else circled around it and the Sun.

British philosopher A. C. Grayling, still believes there is competition between science and religions in areas related to the origin of the universe, the nature of human beings and the possibility of miracles.

=== Independence ===
A modern view, described by Stephen Jay Gould as "non-overlapping magisteria" (NOMA), is that science and religion deal with fundamentally separate aspects of human experience and so, when each stays within its own domain, they co-exist peacefully. While Gould spoke of independence from the perspective of science, W. T. Stace viewed independence from the perspective of the philosophy of religion. Stace felt that science and religion, when each is viewed in its own domain, are both consistent and complete. They originate from different perceptions of reality, as Arnold O. Benz points out, but meet each other, for example, in the feeling of amazement and in ethics.

The USA's National Academy of Sciences supports the view that science and religion are independent.

Science and religion are based on different aspects of human experience. In science, explanations must be based on evidence drawn from examining the natural world. Scientifically based observations or experiments that conflict with an explanation eventually must lead to modification or even abandonment of that explanation. Religious faith, in contrast, does not depend on empirical evidence, is not necessarily modified in the face of conflicting evidence, and typically involves supernatural forces or entities. Because they are not a part of nature, supernatural entities cannot be investigated by science. In this sense, science and religion are separate and address aspects of human understanding in different ways. Attempts to put science and religion against each other create controversy where none needs to exist.

According to Archbishop John Habgood, both science and religion represent distinct ways of approaching experience and these differences are sources of debate. He views science as descriptive and religion as prescriptive. He stated that if science and mathematics concentrate on what the world ought to be, in the way that religion does, it may lead to improperly ascribing properties to the natural world as happened among the followers of Pythagoras in the sixth century B.C. In contrast, proponents of a normative moral science take issue with the idea that science has no way of guiding "oughts". Habgood also stated that he believed that the reverse situation, where religion attempts to be descriptive, can also lead to inappropriately assigning properties to the natural world. A notable example is the now defunct belief in the Ptolemaic (geocentric) planetary model that held sway until changes in scientific and religious thinking were brought about by Galileo and proponents of his views.

In the view of the Lubavitcher rabbi Menachem Mendel Schneerson, non-Euclidean geometry such as Lobachevsky's hyperbolic geometry and Riemann's elliptic geometry proved that Euclid's axioms, such as, "there is only one straight line between two points", are in fact arbitrary. Therefore, science, which relies on arbitrary axioms, can never refute Torah, which is absolute truth.

==== Parallels in method ====
According to Ian Barbour, Thomas S. Kuhn asserted that science is made up of paradigms that arise from cultural traditions, which is similar to the secular perspective on religion.

Michael Polanyi asserted that it is merely a commitment to universality that protects against subjectivity and has nothing at all to do with personal detachment as found in many conceptions of the scientific method. Polanyi further asserted that all knowledge is personal and therefore the scientist must be performing a very personal if not necessarily subjective role when doing science. Polanyi added that the scientist often merely follows intuitions of "intellectual beauty, symmetry, and 'empirical agreement'". Polanyi held that science requires moral commitments similar to those found in religion.

Two physicists, Charles A. Coulson and Harold K. Schilling, both claimed that "the methods of science and religion have much in common." Schilling asserted that both fields—science and religion—have "a threefold structure—of experience, theoretical interpretation, and practical application." Coulson asserted that science, like religion, "advances by creative imagination" and not by "mere collecting of facts," while stating that religion should and does "involve critical reflection on experience not unlike that which goes on in science." Religious language and scientific language also show parallels (cf. rhetoric of science).

=== Dialogue ===
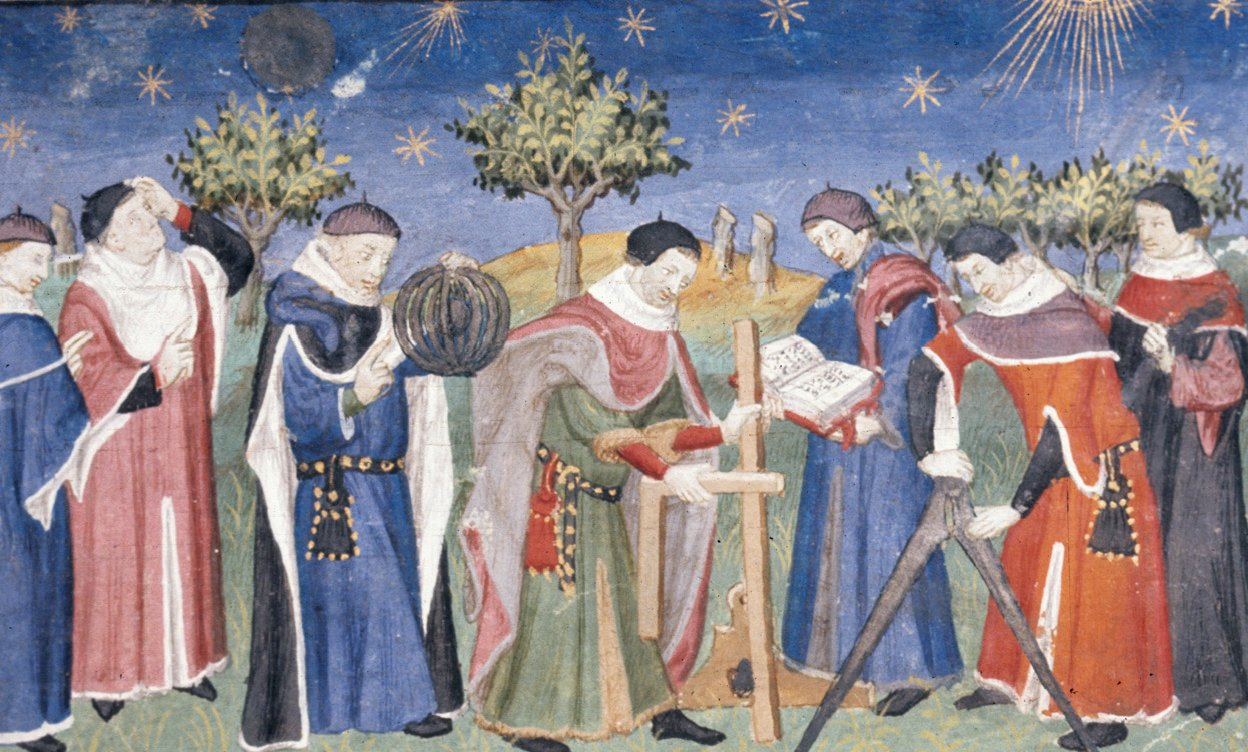
Clerks studying astronomy and geometry (France, early 15th century)

"Science is not only compatible with spirituality; it is a profound source of spirituality."—Carl Sagan, The Demon-Haunted World: Science as a Candle in the Dark

The religion and science community consists of those scholars who involve themselves with what has been called the "religion-and-science dialogue" or the "religion-and-science field." The community belongs to neither the scientific nor the religious community, but is said to be a third overlapping community of interested and involved scientists, priests, clergymen, theologians and engaged non-professionals. Institutions interested in the intersection between science and religion include the Center for Theology and the Natural Sciences, the Institute on Religion in an Age of Science, the Ian Ramsey Centre, and the Faraday Institute. Journals addressing the relationship between science and religion include Theology and Science and Zygon. Eugenie Scott has written that the "science and religion" movement is, overall, composed mainly of theists who have a healthy respect for science and may be beneficial to the public understanding of science. She contends that the "Christian scholarship" movement is not a problem for science, but that the "Theistic science" movement, which proposes abandoning methodological materialism, does cause problems in understanding of the nature of science. The Gifford Lectures were established in 1885 to further the discussion between "natural theology" and the scientific community. This annual series continues and has included William James, John Dewey, Carl Sagan, and many other professors from various fields.

The modern dialogue between religion and science is rooted in Ian Barbour's 1966 book Issues in Science and Religion. Since that time it has grown into a serious academic field, with academic chairs in the subject area, and two dedicated academic journals, Zygon and Theology and Science. Articles are also sometimes found in mainstream science journals such as American Journal of Physics and Science.

Philosopher Alvin Plantinga has argued that there is superficial conflict but deep concord between science and religion, and that there is deep conflict between science and naturalism. Plantinga, in his book Where the Conflict Really Lies: Science, Religion, and Naturalism, heavily contests the linkage of naturalism with science, as conceived by Richard Dawkins, Daniel Dennett and like-minded thinkers; while Daniel Dennett thinks that Plantinga stretches science to an unacceptable extent. Philosopher Maarten Boudry, in reviewing the book, has commented that he resorts to creationism and fails to "stave off the conflict between theism and evolution." Cognitive scientist Justin L. Barrett, by contrast, reviews the same book and writes that "those most needing to hear Plantinga's message may fail to give it a fair hearing for rhetorical rather than analytical reasons."

=== Integration ===
As a general view, this holds that while interactions are complex between influences of science, theology, politics, social, and economic concerns, the productive engagements between science and religion throughout history should be duly stressed as the norm.

Scientific and theological perspectives often coexist peacefully. Christian and non-Christian religions have historically integrated well with scientific ideas, as in the ancient Egyptian technological mastery applied to monotheistic ends, the scientific advances made by Muslim scholars during the Ottoman Empire and mathematics under Hinduism and Buddhism. Even many 19th-century Christian communities welcomed scientists who claimed that science was not at all concerned with discovering the ultimate nature of reality. According to Lawrence M. Principe, the Johns Hopkins University Drew Professor of the Humanities, from a historical perspective this points out that much of the current-day clashes occur between limited extremists—both religious and scientistic fundamentalists—over a very few topics, and that the movement of ideas back and forth between scientific and theological thought has been more usual. To Principe, this perspective would point to the fundamentally common respect for written learning in religious traditions of rabbinical literature, Christian theology, and the Islamic Golden Age, including a Transmission of the Classics from Greek to Islamic to Christian traditions which helped spark the Renaissance. Religions have also given key participation in development of modern universities and libraries; centers of learning & scholarship were coincident with religious institutions—whether pagan, Muslim, or Christian.

== Individual religions ==
=== Baháʼí Faith ===
A fundamental principle of the Baháʼí Faith is the harmony of religion and science. Baháʼí scripture asserts that true science and true religion can never be in conflict. `Abdu'l-Bahá, the son of the founder of the religion, stated that religion without science is superstition and that science without religion is materialism. He also admonished that true religion must conform to the conclusions of science.

=== Buddhism ===
Buddhism and science have been regarded as compatible by numerous authors. Some philosophic and psychological teachings found in Buddhism share points in common with modern Western scientific and philosophic thought. For example, Buddhism encourages the impartial investigation of nature (an activity referred to as Dhamma-Vicaya in the Pali Canon)—the principal object of study being oneself. Buddhism and science both show a strong emphasis on causality. However, Buddhism does not focus on materialism.

Tenzin Gyatso, the 14th Dalai Lama, mentions that empirical scientific evidence supersedes the traditional teachings of Buddhism when the two are in conflict. In his book The Universe in a Single Atom he wrote, "My confidence in venturing into science lies in my basic belief that as in science, so in Buddhism, understanding the nature of reality is pursued by means of critical investigation." He also stated, "If scientific analysis were conclusively to demonstrate certain claims in Buddhism to be false," he says, "then we must accept the findings of science and abandon those claims."

=== Christianity ===
Among early Christian teachers, Tertullian (c. 160–220) held a generally negative opinion of Greek philosophy, while Origen (c. 185–254) regarded it much more favorably and required his students to read nearly every work available to them.

Earlier attempts at reconciliation of Christianity with Newtonian mechanics appear quite different from later attempts at reconciliation with the newer scientific ideas of evolution or relativity. Many early interpretations of evolution polarized themselves around a struggle for existence. These ideas were significantly countered by later findings of universal patterns of biological cooperation. According to John Habgood, the universe seems to be a mix of good and evil, beauty and pain, and that suffering may somehow be part of the process of creation. Habgood holds that Christians should not be surprised that suffering may be used creatively by God, given their faith in the symbol of the Cross. Robert John Russell has examined consonance and dissonance between modern physics, evolutionary biology, and Christian theology.

Christian philosophers Augustine of Hippo (354–430) and Thomas Aquinas (1225–1274) held that scriptures can have multiple interpretations on certain areas where the matters were far beyond their reach, therefore one should leave room for future findings to shed light on the meanings. The "Handmaiden" tradition, which saw secular studies of the universe as a very important and helpful part of arriving at a better understanding of scripture, was adopted throughout Christian history from early on. Also the sense that God created the world as a self operating system is what motivated many Christians throughout the Middle Ages to investigate nature.

Modern historians of science such as J.L. Heilbron, Alistair Cameron Crombie, David Lindberg, Edward Grant, Thomas Goldstein, and Ted Davis have reviewed the popular notion that medieval Christianity was a negative influence in the development of civilization and science. In their views, not only did the monks save and cultivate the remnants of ancient civilization during the barbarian invasions, but the medieval church promoted learning and science through its sponsorship of many universities which, under its leadership, grew rapidly in Europe in the 11th and 12th centuries. Saint Thomas Aquinas, the Church's "model theologian", not only argued that reason is in harmony with faith, he even recognized that reason can contribute to understanding revelation, and so encouraged intellectual development. He was not unlike other medieval theologians who sought out reason in the effort to defend his faith. Some modern scholars, such as Stanley Jaki, have claimed that Christianity with its particular worldview, was a crucial factor for the emergence of modern science.

David C. Lindberg states that the widespread popular belief that the Middle Ages was a time of ignorance and superstition due to the Christian church is a "caricature". According to Lindberg, while there are some portions of the classical tradition which suggest this view, these were exceptional cases. It was common to tolerate and encourage critical thinking about the nature of the world. The relation between Christianity and science is complex and cannot be simplified to either harmony or conflict, according to Lindberg. Lindberg reports that "the late medieval scholar rarely experienced the coercive power of the church and would have regarded himself as free (particularly in the natural sciences) to follow reason and observation wherever they led. There was no warfare between science and the church." Ted Peters in Encyclopedia of Religion writes that although there is some truth in the "Galileo's condemnation" story but through exaggerations, it has now become "a modern myth perpetuated by those wishing to see warfare between science and religion who were allegedly persecuted by an atavistic and dogma-bound ecclesiastical authority". In 1992, the Catholic Church's seeming vindication of Galileo attracted much comment in the media.

A degree of concord between science and religion can be seen in religious belief and empirical science. The belief that God created the world and therefore humans, can lead to the view that he arranged for humans to know the world. This is underwritten by the doctrine of imago dei. In the words of Thomas Aquinas, "Since human beings are said to be in the image of God in virtue of their having a nature that includes an intellect, such a nature is most in the image of God in virtue of being most able to imitate God".

During the Enlightenment, a period "characterized by dramatic revolutions in science" and the rise of Protestant challenges to the authority of the Catholic Church via individual liberty, the authority of Christian scriptures became strongly challenged. As science advanced, acceptance of a literal version of the Bible became "increasingly untenable" and some in that period presented ways of interpreting scripture according to its spirit on its authority and truth.

After the Black Death in Europe, there occurred a generalized decrease in faith in the Catholic Church. The "Natural Sciences" during the Medieval Era focused largely on scientific arguments. The Copernicans, who were generally a small group of privately sponsored individuals, were deemed Heretics by the Church in some instances. Copernicus and his work challenged the view held by the Catholic Church and the common scientific view at the time, yet according to scholar J. L. Heilbron, the Roman Catholic Church sometimes provided financial support to the Copernicans. In doing so, the Church did support and promote scientific research when the goals in question were in alignment with those of the faith, so long as the findings were in line with the rhetoric of the Church. A case example is the Catholic need for an accurate calendar. Calendar reform was a touchy subject: civilians doubted the accuracy of the mathematics and were upset that the process unfairly selected curators of the reform. The Roman Catholic Church needed a precise date for the Easter Sabbath, and thus the Church was highly supportive of calendar reform. The need for the correct date of Easter was also the impetus of cathedral construction. Cathedrals essentially functioned as massive scale sun dials and, in some cases, camera obscuras. They were efficient scientific devices because they rose high enough for their naves to determine the summer and winter solstices. Heilbron contends that as far back as the twelfth century, the Roman Catholic Church was funding scientific discovery and the recovery of ancient Greek scientific texts. However, the Copernican revolution challenged the view held the Catholic Church and placed the Sun at the center of the Solar System.

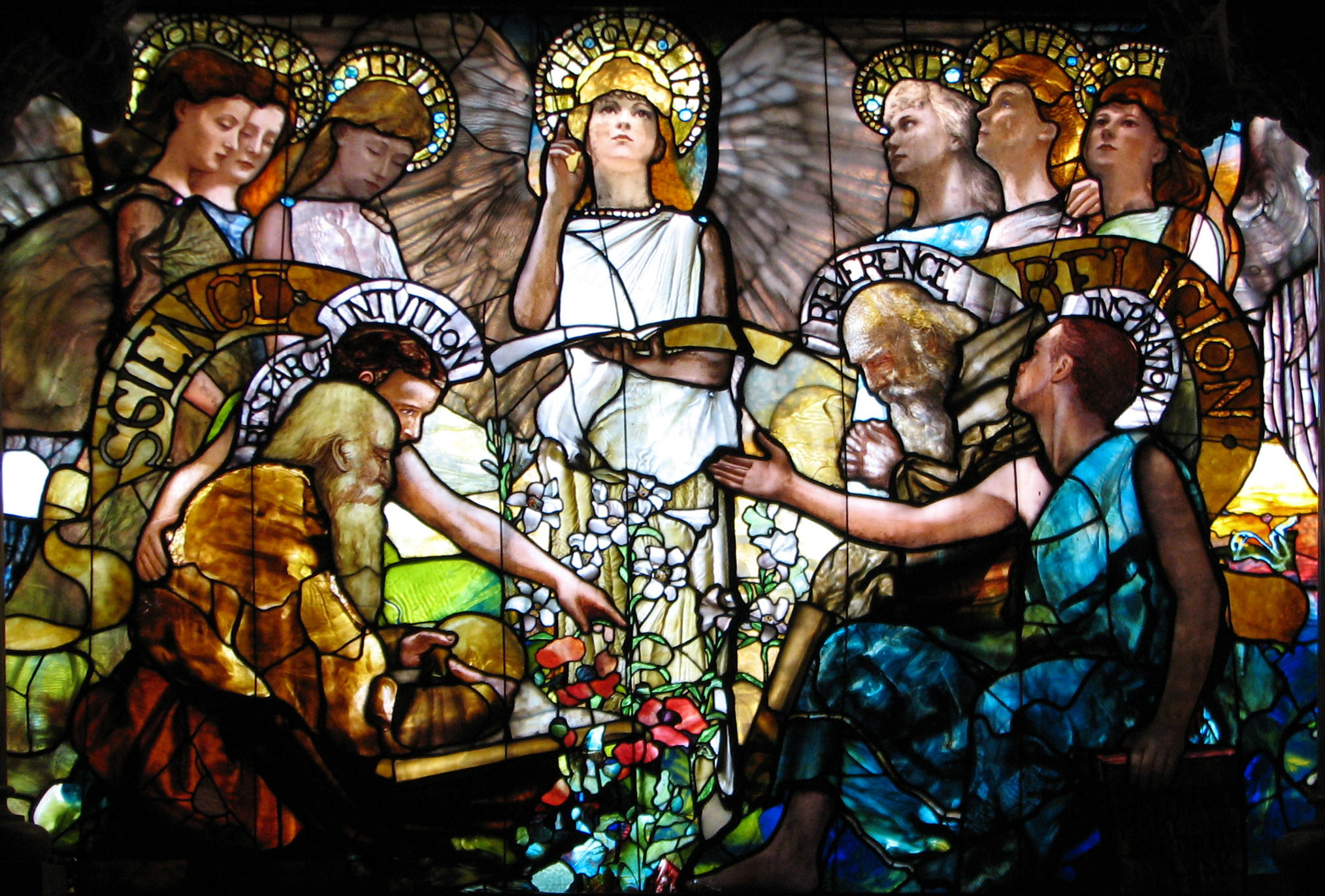
Science and religion are portrayed to be in harmony in the Tiffany window Education (1890).

==== Perspectives on evolution ====
In recent history, the theory of evolution has been at the center of some controversy between Christianity and science. Christians who accept a literal interpretation of the biblical account of creation find incompatibility between Darwinian evolution and their interpretation of the Christian faith. Creation science or scientific creationism is a branch of creationism that attempts to provide scientific support for a literal reading of the Genesis creation narrative in the Book of Genesis and attempts to disprove generally accepted scientific facts, theories and scientific paradigms about the geological history of the Earth, cosmology of the early universe, the chemical origins of life and biological evolution. It began in the 1960s as a fundamentalist Christian effort in the United States to prove Biblical inerrancy and falsify the scientific evidence for evolution. It has since developed a sizable religious following in the United States, with creation science ministries branching worldwide. In 1925, The State of Tennessee passed the Butler Act, which prohibited the teaching of the theory of evolution in all schools in the state. Later that year, a similar law was passed in Mississippi, and likewise, Arkansas in 1927. In 1968, these "anti-monkey" laws were struck down by the Supreme Court of the United States as unconstitutional, "because they established a religious doctrine violating both the First and Fourth Amendments to the Constitution."

Most scientists have rejected creation science for several reasons, including that its claims do not refer to natural causes and cannot be tested. In 1987, the United States Supreme Court ruled that creationism is religion, not science, and cannot be advocated in public school classrooms. In 2018, the Orlando Sentinel reported that "Some private schools in Florida that rely on public funding teach students" Creationism.

Theistic evolution attempts to reconcile Christian beliefs and science by accepting the scientific understanding of the age of the Earth and the process of evolution. It includes a range of beliefs, including views described as evolutionary creationism, which accepts some findings of modern science but also upholds classical religious teachings about God and creation in Christian context.

==== Roman Catholicism ====
While refined and clarified over the centuries, the Roman Catholic position on the relationship between science and religion is one of harmony, and has maintained the teaching of natural law as set forth by Thomas Aquinas. For example, regarding scientific study such as that of evolution, the church's unofficial position is an example of theistic evolution, stating that faith and scientific findings regarding human evolution are not in conflict, though humans are regarded as a special creation, and that the existence of God is required to explain both monogenism and the spiritual component of human origins. Catholic schools have included all manners of scientific study in their curriculum for many centuries.

Galileo once stated that "The intention of the Holy Spirit is to teach us how to go to heaven, not how the heavens go." In 1981, Pope John Paul II, then leader of the Roman Catholic Church, spoke of the relationship this way: "The Bible itself speaks to us of the origin of the universe and its make-up, not in order to provide us with a scientific treatise, but in order to state the correct relationships of man with God and with the universe. Sacred Scripture wishes simply to declare that the world was created by God, and in order to teach this truth it expresses itself in the terms of the cosmology in use at the time of the writer".

Pope Francis, in his encyclical letter Laudato si', affirms his opinion that "science and religion, with their distinctive approaches to understanding reality, can enter into an intense dialogue fruitful for both".

==== Influence of a biblical worldview on early modern science ====
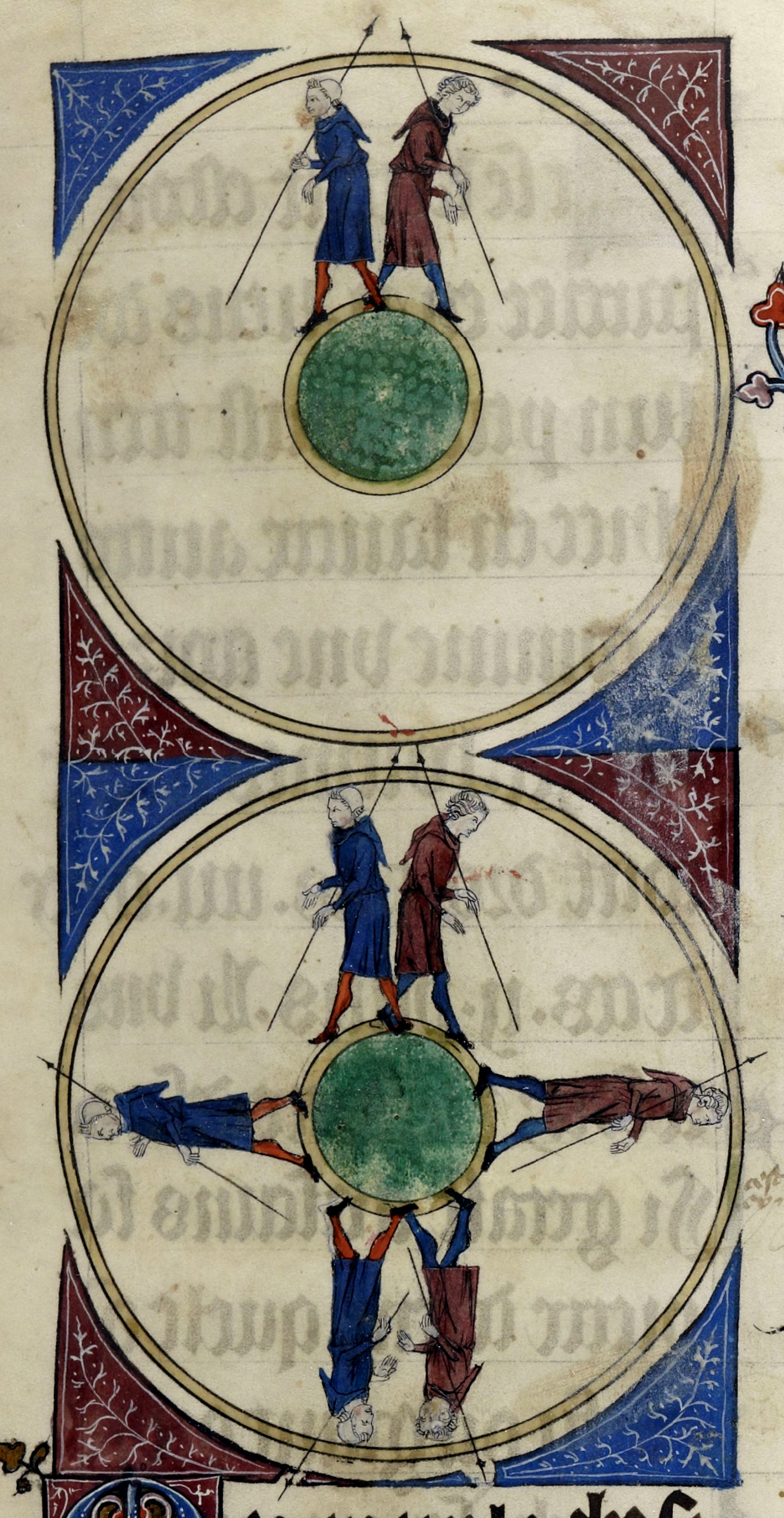
Medieval artistic illustration of the spherical Earth in a 13th-century copy of L'Image du monde (c. 1246)

According to Andrew Dickson White's 1896 book A History of the Warfare of Science with Theology in Christendom, a biblical world view affected negatively the progress of science through time. Dickinson also argues that immediately following the Reformation matters were even worse. The interpretations of Scripture by Luther and Calvin became as sacred to their followers as the Scripture itself. For instance, when Georg Calixtus ventured, in interpreting the Psalms, to question the accepted belief that "the waters above the heavens" were contained in a vast receptacle upheld by a solid vault, he was bitterly denounced as heretical. Today, much of the scholarship in which the conflict thesis was originally based is considered to be inaccurate. For instance, the claim that early Christians rejected scientific findings by the Greco-Romans is false, since the "handmaiden" view of secular studies was seen to shed light on theology. This view was widely adapted throughout the early medieval period and afterwards by theologians (such as Augustine) and ultimately resulted in fostering interest in knowledge about nature through time. Also, the claim that people of the Middle Ages widely believed that the Earth was flat was first propagated in the same period that originated the conflict thesis and is still very common in popular culture. Modern scholars regard this claim as mistaken, as the contemporary historians of science David C. Lindberg and Ronald L. Numbers write: "there was scarcely a Christian scholar of the Middle Ages who did not acknowledge [earth's] sphericity and even know its approximate circumference." From the fall of Rome to the time of Columbus, all major scholars and many vernacular writers interested in the physical shape of the earth held a spherical view with the exception of Lactantius and Cosmas.

H. Floris Cohen argued for a biblical Protestant, but not excluding Catholicism, influence on the early development of modern science. He presented Dutch historian R. Hooykaas' argument that a biblical world-view holds all the necessary antidotes for the hubris of Greek rationalism: a respect for manual labour, leading to more experimentation and empiricism, and a supreme God that left nature open to emulation and manipulation. It supports the idea early modern science rose due to a combination of Greek and biblical thought.

Oxford historian Peter Harrison is another who has argued that a biblical worldview was significant for the development of modern science. Harrison contends that Protestant approaches to the book of scripture had significant, if largely unintended, consequences for the interpretation of the book of nature. Harrison has also suggested that literal readings of the Genesis narratives of the Creation and Fall motivated and legitimated scientific activity in seventeenth-century England. For many of its seventeenth-century practitioners, science was imagined to be a means of restoring a human dominion over nature that had been lost as a consequence of the Fall.

Historian and professor of religion Eugene M. Klaaren holds that "a belief in divine creation" was central to an emergence of science in seventeenth-century England. The philosopher Michael Foster has published analytical philosophy connecting Christian doctrines of creation with empiricism. Historian William B. Ashworth has argued against the historical notion of distinctive mind-sets and the idea of Catholic and Protestant sciences. Historians James R. Jacob and Margaret C. Jacob have argued for a linkage between seventeenth-century Anglican intellectual transformations and influential English scientists (e.g., Robert Boyle and Isaac Newton). John Dillenberger and Christopher B. Kaiser have written theological surveys, which also cover additional interactions occurring in the 18th, 19th, and 20th centuries. Philosopher of Religion, Richard Jones, has written a philosophical critique of the "dependency thesis" which assumes that modern science emerged from Christian sources and doctrines. Though he acknowledges that modern science emerged in a religious framework, that Christianity greatly elevated the importance of science by sanctioning and religiously legitimizing it in the medieval period, and that Christianity created a favorable social context for it to grow; he argues that direct Christian beliefs or doctrines were not primary sources of scientific pursuits by natural philosophers, nor was Christianity, in and of itself, exclusively or directly necessary in developing or practicing modern science.

Oxford University historian and theologian John Hedley Brooke wrote that "when natural philosophers referred to laws of nature, they were not glibly choosing that metaphor. Laws were the result of legislation by an intelligent deity. Thus the philosopher René Descartes (1596–1650) insisted that he was discovering the "laws that God has put into nature." Later Newton would declare that the regulation of the solar system presupposed the "counsel and dominion of an intelligent and powerful Being." Historian Ronald L. Numbers stated that this thesis "received a boost" from mathematician and philosopher Alfred North Whitehead's Science and the Modern World (1925). Numbers has also argued, "Despite the manifest shortcomings of the claim that Christianity gave birth to science—most glaringly, it ignores or minimizes the contributions of ancient Greeks and medieval Muslims—it too, refuses to succumb to the death it deserves." The sociologist Rodney Stark of Baylor University, argued in contrast that "Christian theology was essential for the rise of science."

Protestantism had an important influence on science. According to the Merton Thesis there was a positive correlation between the rise of Puritanism and Protestant Pietism on the one hand and early experimental science on the other. The Merton Thesis has two separate parts: Firstly, it presents a theory that science changes due to an accumulation of observations and improvement in experimental techniques and methodology; secondly, it puts forward the argument that the popularity of science in 17th-century England and the religious demography of the Royal Society (English scientists of that time were predominantly Puritans or other Protestants) can be explained by a correlation between Protestantism and the scientific values. In his theory, Robert K. Merton focused on English Puritanism and German Pietism as having been responsible for the development of the scientific revolution of the 17th and 18th centuries. Merton explained that the connection between religious affiliation and interest in science was the result of a significant synergy between the ascetic Protestant values and those of modern science. Protestant values encouraged scientific research by allowing science to study God's influence on the world and thus providing a religious justification for scientific research.

Some scholars have noted a direct tie between "particular aspects of traditional Christianity" and the rise of science. Other scholars and historians attribute Christianity to having contributed to the rise of the Scientific Revolution.

==== Reconciliation in Britain in the early 20th century ====
In Reconciling Science and Religion: The Debate in Early-twentieth-century Britain, historian of biology Peter J. Bowler argues that in contrast to the conflicts between science and religion in the U.S. in the 1920s (most famously the Scopes Trial), during this period Great Britain experienced a concerted effort at reconciliation, championed by intellectually conservative scientists, supported by liberal theologians but opposed by younger scientists and secularists and conservative Christians. These attempts at reconciliation fell apart in the 1930s due to increased social tensions, moves towards neo-orthodox theology and the acceptance of the modern evolutionary synthesis.

In the 20th century, several ecumenical organizations promoting a harmony between science and Christianity were founded, most notably the American Scientific Affiliation, The Biologos Foundation, Christians in Science, The Society of Ordained Scientists, and The Veritas Forum.

=== Confucianism and traditional Chinese religion ===
The historical process of Confucianism has largely been antipathic towards scientific discovery. However the religio-philosophical system itself is more neutral on the subject than such an analysis might suggest. In his writings On Heaven, Xunzi espoused a proto-scientific world view. However, during the Han Synthesis the more anti-empirical Mencius was favored and combined with Daoist skepticism regarding the nature of reality. Likewise, during the medieval period, Zhu Xi argued against technical investigation and specialization proposed by Chen Liang. After contact with the West, scholars such as Wang Fuzhi would rely on Buddhist/Daoist skepticism to denounce all science as a subjective pursuit limited by humanity's fundamental ignorance of the true nature of the world.

The Jesuits from Europe taught Western math and science to the Chinese bureaucrats in hopes of religious conversion. This process saw several challenges of both European and Chinese spiritual and scientific beliefs. The keynote text of Chinese scientific philosophy, The Book of Changes (or Yi Jing) was initially mocked and disregarded by the Westerners. In return, Confucian scholars Dai Zhen and Ji Yun found the concept of phantoms laughable and ridiculous. The Book of Changes outlined orthodoxy cosmology in the Qing, including yin and yang and the five cosmic phases. Sometimes the missionary exploits proved dangerous for the Westerners. Jesuit missionaries and scholars Ferdinand Vervbiest and Adam Schall were punished after using scientific methods to determine the exact time of the 1664 eclipse. However, the European mission eastward did not only cause conflict. Joachim Bouvet, a theologian who held equal respect for both the Bible and the Book of Changes, was productive in his mission of spreading the Christian faith.

After the May Fourth Movement, attempts to modernize Confucianism and reconcile it with scientific understanding were attempted by many scholars including Feng Youlan and Xiong Shili. Given the close relationship that Confucianism shares with Buddhism, many of the same arguments used to reconcile Buddhism with science also readily translate to Confucianism. However, modern scholars have also attempted to define the relationship between science and Confucianism on Confucianism's own terms and the results have usually led to the conclusion that Confucianism and science are fundamentally compatible.

=== Hinduism ===
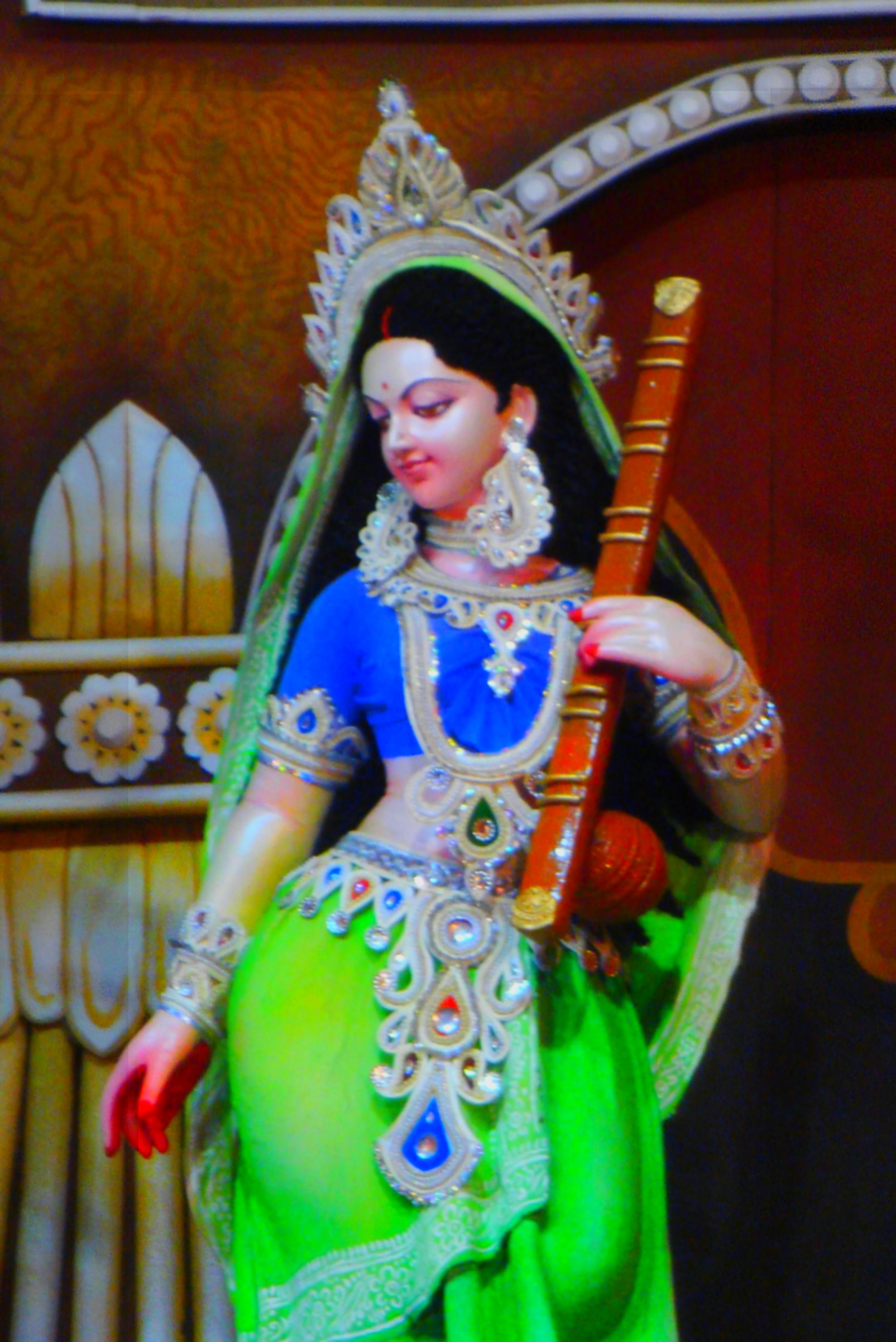
Saraswati is regarded as goddess of knowledge, music, arts and science.

In Hinduism, the dividing line between objective sciences and spiritual knowledge (adhyatma vidya) is a linguistic paradox. Hindu scholastic activities and ancient Indian scientific advancements were so interconnected that many Hindu scriptures are also ancient scientific manuals and vice versa. In 1835, English was made the primary language for teaching in higher education in India, exposing Hindu scholars to Western secular ideas; this started a Hindu Renaissance regarding religious and philosophical thought.

Hindu sages maintained that logical argument and rational proof using Nyaya is the way to obtain correct knowledge. The scientific level of understanding focuses on how things work and from where they originate, while Hinduism strives to understand the ultimate purposes for the existence of living things. To obtain and broaden the knowledge of the world for spiritual perfection, many refer to the Bhāgavata for guidance because it draws upon a scientific and theological dialogue. The Bhagavata argues that understanding how nature works is necessary before understanding God. Hinduism offers methods to correct and transform itself in course of time. For instance, Hindu views on the development of life include a range of viewpoints in regards to evolution, creationism, and the origin of life within the traditions of Hinduism. For instance, it has been suggested that Wallace-Darwininan evolutionary thought was a part of Hindu thought centuries before modern times. The Shankara and the Sāmkhya did not have a problem with the theory of evolution, but instead, argued about the existence of God and what happened after death. These two distinct groups argued among each other's philosophies because of their texts, not the idea of evolution. With the publication of Darwin's On the Origin of Species, many Hindus were eager to connect their scriptures to Darwinism, finding similarities between Brahma's creation, Vishnu's incarnations, and evolution theories.

Samkhya, the oldest school of Hindu philosophy prescribes a particular method to analyze knowledge. According to Samkhya, all knowledge is possible through three means of valid knowledge –

1. Pratyakṣa or Dṛṣṭam – direct sense perception,
2. Anumāna – logical inference and
3. Śabda or Āptavacana – verbal testimony.

Nyaya, the Hindu school of logic, accepts all these 3 means and in addition accepts one more – Upamāna (comparison).

The accounts of the emergence of life within the universe vary in description, but classically the deity called Brahma, from a Trimurti of three deities also including Vishnu and Shiva, is described as performing the act of 'creation', or more specifically of 'propagating life within the universe' with the other two deities being responsible for 'preservation' and 'destruction' (of the universe) respectively. In this respect some Hindu schools do not treat the scriptural creation myth literally and often the creation stories themselves do not go into specific detail, thus leaving open the possibility of incorporating at least some theories in support of evolution. Some Hindus find support for, or foreshadowing of evolutionary ideas in scriptures, namely the Vedas.

The incarnations of Vishnu (Dashavatara) is almost identical to the scientific explanation of the sequence of biological evolution of man and animals. The sequence of avatars starts from an aquatic organism (Matsya), to an amphibian (Kurma), to a land-animal (Varaha), to a humanoid (Narasimha), to a dwarf human (Vamana), to 5 forms of well developed human beings (Parashurama, Rama, Balarama/Buddha, Krishna, Kalki) who showcase an increasing form of complexity (Axe-man, King, Plougher/Sage, wise Statesman, mighty Warrior). In fact, many Hindu gods are represented with features of animals as well as those of humans, leading many Hindus to easily accept evolutionary links between animals and humans. In India, the home country of Hindus, educated Hindus widely accept the theory of biological evolution. In a survey of 909 people, 77% of respondents in India agreed with Charles Darwin's Theory of Evolution, and 85 per cent of God-believing people said they believe in evolution as well.

As per Vedas, another explanation for the creation is based on the five elements: earth, water, fire, air and aether. The Hindu religion traces its beginnings to the Vedas. Everything that is established in the Hindu faith such as the gods and goddesses, doctrines, chants, spiritual insights, etc. flow from the poetry of Vedic hymns. The Vedas offer an honor to the sun and moon, water and wind, and to the order in Nature that is universal. This naturalism is the beginning of what further becomes the connection between Hinduism and science.

=== Islam ===
From an Islamic standpoint, science, the study of nature, is considered to be linked to the concept of Tawhid (the Oneness of God), as are all other branches of knowledge. In Islam, nature is not seen as a separate entity, but rather as an integral part of Islam's holistic outlook on God, humanity, and the world. The Islamic view of science and nature is continuous with that of religion and God. This link implies a sacred aspect to the pursuit of scientific knowledge by Muslims, as nature itself is viewed in the Qur'an as a compilation of signs pointing to the Divine. It was with this understanding that science was studied and understood in Islamic civilizations, specifically during the eighth to sixteenth centuries, prior to the colonization of the Muslim world. Robert Briffault, in The Making of Humanity, asserts that the very existence of science, as it is understood in the modern sense, is rooted in the scientific thought and knowledge that emerged in Islamic civilizations during this time. Ibn al-Haytham, an Arab Muslim, was an early proponent of the concept that a hypothesis must be proved by experiments based on confirmable procedures or mathematical evidence—hence understanding the scientific method 200 years before Renaissance scientists. Ibn al-Haytham described his theology:

I constantly sought knowledge and truth, and it became my belief that for gaining access to the effulgence and closeness to God, there is no better way than that of searching for truth and knowledge.

With the decline of Islamic Civilizations in the late Middle Ages and the rise of Europe, the Islamic scientific tradition shifted into a new period. Institutions that had existed for centuries in the Muslim world looked to the new scientific institutions of European powers. This changed the practice of science in the Muslim world, as Islamic scientists had to confront the western approach to scientific learning, which was based on a different philosophy of nature. From the time of this initial upheaval of the Islamic scientific tradition to the present day, Muslim scientists and scholars have developed a spectrum of viewpoints on the place of scientific learning within the context of Islam, none of which are universally accepted or practiced. However, most maintain the view that the acquisition of knowledge and scientific pursuit in general is not in disaccord with Islamic thought and religious belief.

During the thirteenth century, the Caliphate system in the Islamic Empire fell, and scientific discovery thrived. The Islamic Civilization has a long history of scientific advancement; and their theological practices catalyzed a great deal of scientific discovery. In fact, it was due to necessities of Muslim worship and their vast empire that much science and philosophy was created. People needed to know in which direction they needed to pray toward to face Mecca. Many historians through time have asserted that all modern science originates from ancient Greek scholarship; but scholars like Martin Bernal have claimed that most ancient Greek scholarship relied heavily on the work of scholars from ancient Egypt and the Levant. Ancient Egypt was the foundational site of the Hermetic School, which believed that the sun represented an invisible God. Amongst other things, Islamic civilization was key because it documented and recorded Greek scholarship.

==== Ahmadiyya ====
The Ahmadiyya movement emphasize that "there is no contradiction between Islam and science". For example, Ahmadi Muslims universally accept in principle the process of evolution, albeit divinely guided, and actively promote it. Over the course of several decades the movement has issued various publications in support of the scientific concepts behind the process of evolution, and frequently engages in promoting how religious scriptures, such as the Qur'an, supports the concept. For general purposes, the second Khalifa of the community, Mirza Basheer-ud-Din Mahmood Ahmad says:

The Holy Quran directs attention towards science, time and again, rather than evoking prejudice against it. The Quran has never advised against studying science, lest the reader should become a non-believer; because it has no such fear or concern. The Holy Quran is not worried that if people will learn the laws of nature its spell will break. The Quran has not prevented people from science, rather it states, "Say, 'Reflect on what is happening in the heavens and the earth.'" (Al Younus)

=== Jainism ===
==== Biology ====
Jainism classifies life into two main divisions those who are static by nature (sthavar) and those who are mobile (trasa).

Jain texts describes life in plant long before Jagdish Chandra Bose proved that plants have life. In the Jain philosophy the plant lives are termed as 'Vanaspatikaya'.

==== Jainism and non-creationism ====
Jain theory of causality holds that a cause and its effect are always identical in nature and an immaterial entity like a creator God cannot be the cause of a material entity like the universe. According to Jain belief, it is not possible to create matter out of nothing.^{[a]} The universe and its constituents– soul, matter, space, time, and natural laws have always existed (a static universe, similar to that proposed by the steady state cosmological model).

== Surveys on scientists and the general public ==
=== Scientists ===
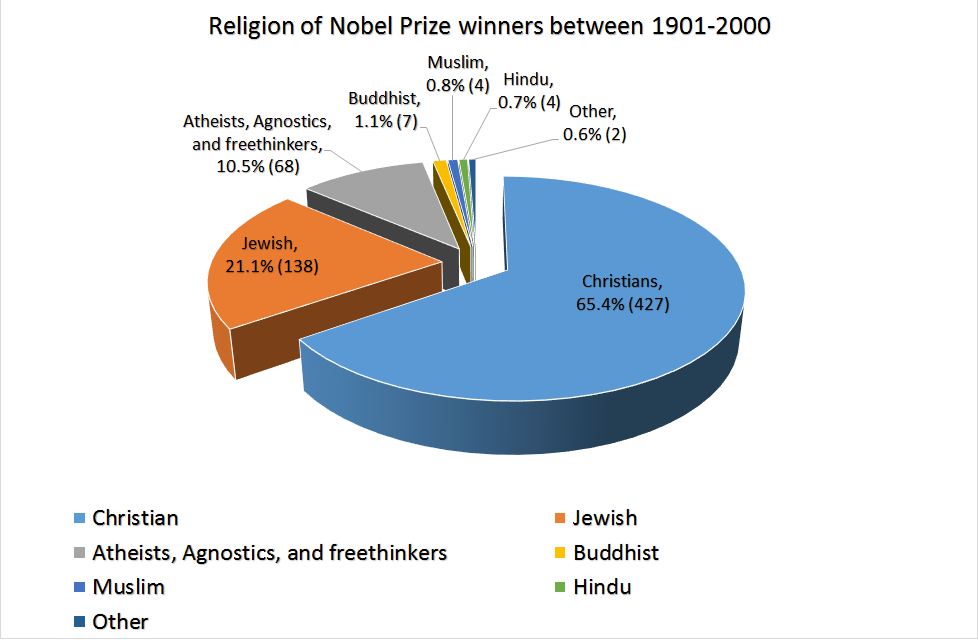
Distribution of Nobel Prizes by religion between 1901 and 2000

Between 1901 and 2000, 654 Nobel prize laureates belonged to 28 different religions. Most (65%) have identified Christianity in its various forms as their religious preference. Specifically on the science-related prizes, Christians have won a total of 73% of all the Chemistry, 65% in Physics, 62% in Medicine, and 54% in all Economics awards. Jewish descent (including Jewish atheists) have won 17% of the prizes in Chemistry, 26% in Medicine, and 23% in Physics. Atheists, Agnostics, and Freethinkers (does not include Jewish atheists) have won 7% of the prizes in Chemistry, 9% in Medicine, and 5% in Physics. Muslims have won 13 prizes (three were in scientific categories).

According to scholar Benjamin Beit-Hallahmi, between 1901 and 2001, about 57% of laureates in scientific fields were Christians, and 26% were of Jewish descent (including Jewish atheists).

==== Global ====
According to a 2019 global study which surveyed 22,525 scientists from eight different countries, a significant portion of scientists around the world were found to have religious identities, beliefs, and practices. Specifically, in the United States, 65% of scientists identified as atheist or agnostic, while 31% identified as religious. In the United Kingdom and France, around 70% of scientists were non-religious. In contrast, in Italy around 52% of scientists are religious, in Turkey about 59% identified as religious, and in India the majority identified as Hindu, with only about 20% being atheist or agnostic. In Hong Kong and Taiwan, around 50% of scientists identified with a religious tradition being Buddhism, Taoism, Christianity or indigenous folk religions.

Furthermore, the majority of scientists do not believe there is inherent conflict in being religious and a scientist and stated that "the conflict perspective on science and religion is an invention of the West", since such a view is not prevalent among most of scientists around the world. Instead of seeing religion and science as 'always in conflict' they rather view it through the lenses of various cultural dimensions to the relations between religion and science. In an international study, very few scientists stated that scientific training or knowledge played a role in any declines in personal religiosity.

==== Europe ====
In 2013, a survey on eminent scientists of the Royal Society found that "the majority of Fellows affirmed strong opposition to the belief in a personal god, to the existence of a supernatural entity and to survival of death." They also noted that biologists are less likely to be religious than other scientific disciplines, as well as them having more perceptions of conflicts between science and religion.

According to a study from 2023 "30–39% of Western-European researchers identify with "some religious affiliation". "30–37% of scientists identify as non-believers or atheists, and an additional 10–28% as agnostic (with wide geographical differences)".

==== United States ====
In 1916, 1,000 leading American scientists were randomly chosen from American Men of Science and 42% believed God existed, 42% disbelieved, and 17% had doubts/did not know; however, when the study was replicated 80 years later using American Men and Women of Science in 1996, the results were very much the same with 39% believing God exists, 45% disbelieved, and 15% had doubts/did not know. In the same 1996 survey, for scientists in the fields of biology, mathematics, and physics/astronomy, belief in a god that is "in intellectual and affective communication with humankind" was most popular among mathematicians (about 45%) and least popular among physicists (about 22%).

In terms of belief in God among elite scientists, such as "great scientists" in the "American Men of Science" or members of the National Academies of Science; 53% disbelieved, 21% were agnostic, and 28% believed in 1914; 68% disbelieved, 17% were agnostic, and 15% believed in 1933; and 72% disbelieved, 21% were agnostic, and 7% believed in 1998. However Eugenie Scott argued that there are methodological issues in the study, including ambiguity in the questions such using a personal definition of God instead of broader definitions of God. A study with simplified wording to include impersonal or non-interventionist ideas of God concluded that 40% of "prominent scientists" in the US believe in a god.

Others have also observed some methodological issues which impacted the results.

A survey conducted between 2005 and 2007 by Elaine Howard Ecklund of University at Buffalo, The State University of New York of 1,646 natural and social science professors at 21 US research universities found that, in terms of belief in God or a higher power, more than 60% expressed either disbelief or agnosticism and more than 30% expressed belief. More specifically, nearly 34% answered "I do not believe in God" and about 30% answered "I do not know if there is a God and there is no way to find out." In the same study, 28% said they believed in God and 8% believed in a higher power that was not God. Ecklund stated that scientists were often able to consider themselves spiritual without religion or belief in god. Ecklund and Scheitle concluded, from their study, that the individuals from non-religious backgrounds disproportionately had self-selected into scientific professions and that the assumption that becoming a scientist necessarily leads to loss of religion is untenable since the study did not strongly support the idea that scientists had dropped religious identities due to their scientific training. Instead, factors such as upbringing, age, and family size were significant influences on religious identification since those who had religious upbringing were more likely to be religious and those who had a non-religious upbringing were more likely to not be religious. The authors also found little difference in religiosity between social and natural scientists.

In terms of perceptions, most social and natural scientists from 21 American universities did not perceive conflict between science and religion, while 37% did. However, in the study, scientists who had experienced limited exposure to religion tended to perceive conflict. In the same study they found that nearly one in five atheist scientists who are parents (17%) are part of religious congregations and have attended a religious service more than once in the past year. Some of the reasons for doing so are their scientific identity (wishing to expose their children to all sources of knowledge so they can make up their own minds), spousal influence, and desire for community.

A 2009 report by the Pew Research Center found that members of the American Association for the Advancement of Science (AAAS) were "much less religious than the general public," with 51% believing in some form of deity or higher power. Specifically, 33% of those polled believe in God, 18% believe in a universal spirit or higher power, and 41% did not believe in either God or a higher power. 48% say they have a religious affiliation, equal to the number who say they are not affiliated with any religious tradition. 17% were atheists, 11% were agnostics, 20% were nothing in particular, 8% were Jewish, 10% were Catholic, 16% were Protestant, 4% were Evangelical, 10% were other religion. The survey also found younger scientists to be "substantially more likely than their older counterparts to say they believe in God". Among the surveyed fields, chemists were the most likely to say they believe in God.

Elaine Ecklund conducted a study from 2011 to 2014 involving the general US population, including rank and file scientists, in collaboration with the AAAS. The study noted that 76% of the scientists identified with a religious tradition. 85% of evangelical scientists had no doubts about the existence of God, compared to 35% of the whole scientific population. In terms of religion and science, 85% of evangelical scientists saw no conflict (73% collaboration, 12% independence), while 75% of the whole scientific population saw no conflict (40% collaboration, 35% independence).

Religious beliefs of US professors were examined using a nationally representative sample of more than 1,400 professors. They found that in the social sciences: 23% did not believe in God, 16% did not know if God existed, 43% believed God existed, and 16% believed in a higher power. Out of the natural sciences: 20% did not believe in God, 33% did not know if God existed, 44% believed God existed, and 4% believed in a higher power. Overall, out of the whole study: 10% were atheists, 13% were agnostic, 19% believe in a higher power, 4% believe in God some of the time, 17% had doubts but believed in God, 35% believed in God and had no doubts.

In 2005, Farr Curlin, a University of Chicago Instructor in Medicine and a member of the MacLean Center for Clinical Medical Ethics, noted in a study that doctors tend to be science-minded religious people. He helped author a study that "found that 76 percent of doctors believe in God and 59 percent believe in some sort of afterlife." Furthermore, "90 percent of doctors in the United States attend religious services at least occasionally, compared to 81 percent of all adults." He reasoned, "The responsibility to care for those who are suffering and the rewards of helping those in need resonate throughout most religious traditions.". A study from 2017 on 2,097 individuals, showed 65% of physicians believe in God.

==== Other countries ====
According to the Study of Secularism in Society and Culture's report on 1,100 scientists in India: 66% are Hindu, 14% did not report a religion, 10% are atheist/no religion, 3% are Muslim, 3% are Christian, 4% are Buddhist, Sikh or other. 39% have a belief in a god, 6% have belief in a god sometimes, 30% do not believe in a god but believe in a higher power, 13% do not know if there is a god, and 12% do not believe in a god. 49% believe in the efficacy of prayer, 90% strongly agree or somewhat agree with approving degrees in Ayurvedic medicine. Furthermore, the term "secularism" is understood to have diverse and simultaneous meanings among Indian scientists: 93% believe it to be tolerance of religions and philosophies, 83% see it as involving separation of church and state, 53% see it as not identifying with religious traditions, 40% see it as absence of religious beliefs, and 20% see it as atheism. Accordingly, 75% of Indian scientists had a "secular" outlook in terms of being tolerant of other religions.

According to the Religion Among Scientists in International Context (RASIC) study on 1,581 scientists from the United Kingdom and 1,763 scientists from India, along with 200 interviews: 65% of U.K. scientists identified as nonreligious and only 6% of Indian scientists identify as nonreligious, 12% of scientists in the U.K. attend religious services on a regular basis and 32% of scientists in India do. In terms of the Indian scientists, 73% of scientists responded that there are basic truths in many religions, 27% said they believe in God and 38% expressed belief in a higher power of some kind. In terms of perceptions of conflict between science and religion, less than half of both U.K. scientists (38%) and Indian scientists (18%) perceived conflict between religion and science.

A 2016 study surveyed 9,422 biologists and physicists from France, Hong Kong, India, Italy, Taiwan, Turkey, the United Kingdom, and the United States. It included those from a mix of elite and non-elite universities, including research institutions. They discovered that in most national contexts, scientists are always much less religious than the general population, but in specific regional contexts more than half of respective scientists saw themselves as religious. Overall, most scientists stated science has no conflict with religion, but are separate spheres.

According to Elaine Ecklund's research on 1,293 atheist scientists from the US and UK, a majority of atheist scientists came from a nonreligious upbringing and never had a religious affiliation. Also, fewer than half of the atheist scientists who were exposed to religion in their youth said science played a role in them becoming an atheist.

=== General public ===
Global studies which have pooled data on religion and science from 1981 to 2001, have noted that countries with greater faith in science also often have stronger religious beliefs, while less religious countries have more skepticism of the impact of science and technology.

Other research cites the National Science Foundation's finding that America has more favorable public attitudes towards science than Europe, Russia, and Japan despite differences in levels of religiosity in these cultures.

Other cross-national studies have found no correlations supporting the contention that religiosity undermines interest in science topics or activities among the general populations globally.

Cross-cultural studies indicate that people tend to use both natural and supernatural explanations for explaining numerous things about the world such as illness, death, and origins. In other words, they do not think of natural and supernatural explanations as antagonistic or dichotomous, but instead see them as coexisting and complementary. The reconciliation of natural and supernatural explanations is normal and pervasive from a psychological standpoint across cultures.

In 2018, data from Wellcome Global Monitor on public attitudes towards health and science from over 140 countries, showed that 29% said science has disagreed with teachings from their religion, while the region of North America stood out at 57%. Amongst world individuals with a religious affiliation; 55% would agree with their religious teachings if they are in disagreement with science, 29% would agree with scientific findings, while 13% specified it depends on the issue. Globally, 64% percent of people who stated religion is an important part of their daily life, say that when there is a disagreement they would believe religion.

==== Europe ====
A study conducted on adolescents from Christian schools in Northern Ireland, noted a positive relationship between attitudes towards Christianity and science once attitudes towards scientism and creationism were accounted for.

A study on people from Sweden concludes that though the Swedes are among the most non-religious, paranormal beliefs are prevalent among both the young and adult populations. This is likely due to a loss of confidence in institutions such as the Church and Science.

In the Netherlands, beliefs of "convinced atheists" are quite diverse: 41.1% of them say they believe in telepathy, 21.1% in reincarnation, 13.3% in life after death, and 1.6% in heaven. The percentages on telepathy and reincarnation were similar to the percentages of "religious people" in the Netherlands.

Concerning specific topics like creationism, it is not an exclusively American phenomenon. A poll on adult Europeans revealed that 40% believed in naturalistic evolution, 21% in theistic evolution, 20% in special creation, and 19% are undecided; with the highest concentrations of young earth creationists in Switzerland (21%), Austria (20%), Germany (18%). Other countries such as Netherlands, Britain, and Australia have experienced growth in such views as well.

==== United States ====
According to a 2015 Pew Research Center Study on the public perceptions on science, people's perceptions on conflict with science have more to do with their perceptions of other people's beliefs than their own personal beliefs. For instance, the majority of people with a religious affiliation (68%) saw no conflict between their own personal religious beliefs and science while the majority of those without a religious affiliation (76%) perceived science and religion to be in conflict. The study noted that people who are not affiliated with any religion, also known as "religiously unaffiliated", often have supernatural beliefs and spiritual practices despite them not being affiliated with any religion and also that "just one-in-six religiously unaffiliated adults (16%) say their own religious beliefs conflict with science." Furthermore, the study observed, "The share of all adults who perceive a conflict between science and their own religious beliefs has declined somewhat in recent years, from 36% in 2009 to 30% in 2014. Among those who are affiliated with a religion, the share of people who say there is a conflict between science and their personal religious beliefs dropped from 41% to 34% during this period."

In 2023, Pew study stated that 77% of self-identified "atheists" in the US do not believe in either a higher power or a god, while 23% of self-identified atheists do believe in a higher power of some kind, but not a god; with pew stating "not all self-described atheists fit the literal definition of “atheist”".

In a 2024 Pew research center report, only 35% of "nones" (atheist, agnostics, and nothing in particular on religious affiliation) believe that the natural world is all there is, while the majority of nones (63%) believe there are spiritual things beyond the world; and the majority of nones (56%) also believe there are some things that science cannot explain.

The 2013 MIT Survey on Science, Religion and Origins examined the views of religious people in America on origins science topics like evolution, the Big Bang, and perceptions of conflicts between science and religion. It found that a large majority of religious people see no conflict between science and religion and only 11% of religious people belong to religions openly rejecting evolution. The fact that the gap between personal and official beliefs of their religions is so large suggests that part of the problem, might be defused by people learning more about their own religious doctrine and the science it endorses, thereby bridging this belief gap. The study concluded that "mainstream religion and mainstream science are neither attacking one another nor perceiving a conflict." Furthermore, they note that this conciliatory view is shared by most leading science organizations such as the American Association for the Advancement of Science (AAAS).

A study was made in collaboration with the AAAS collecting data on the general public from 2011 to 2014, with the focus on evangelicals and evangelical scientists. Even though evangelicals make up only 26% of the US population, the study found that nearly 70 percent of all evangelical Christians do not view science and religion as being in conflict with each other (48% saw them as complementary and 21% saw them as independent) while 73% of the general US population saw no conflict either.

According to Elaine Ecklund's 2018 study, the majority of religious groups see religion and science in collaboration or independent of each other, while the majority of groups without religion see science and religion in conflict.

Other lines of research on perceptions of science among the American public conclude that most religious groups see no general epistemological conflict with science and they have no differences with nonreligious groups in the propensity of seeking out scientific knowledge, although there may be subtle epistemic or moral conflicts when scientists make counterclaims to religious tenets. Findings from the Pew Center note similar findings and also note that the majority of Americans (80–90%) show strong support for scientific research, agree that science makes society and individual's lives better, and 8 in 10 Americans would be happy if their children were to become scientists. Even strict creationists tend to have very favorable views on science.

According to a 2007 poll by the Pew Forum, "while large majorities of Americans respect science and scientists, they are not always willing to accept scientific findings that squarely contradict their religious beliefs." The Pew Forum states that specific factual disagreements are "not common today", though 40% to 50% of Americans do not accept the evolution of humans and other living things, with the "strongest opposition" coming from evangelical Christians at 65% saying life did not evolve. 51% of the population believes humans and other living things evolved: 26% through natural selection only, 21% somehow guided, 4% do not know. In the U.S., biological evolution is the only concrete example of conflict where a significant portion of the American public denies scientific consensus for religious reasons. In terms of advanced industrialized nations, the United States is the most religious.

A 2009 study from the Pew Research Center on Americans perceptions of science, showed a broad consensus that most Americans, including most religious Americans, hold scientific research and scientists themselves in high regard. The study showed that 84% of Americans say they view science as having a mostly positive impact on society. Among those who attend religious services at least once a week, the number is roughly the same at 80%. Furthermore, 70% of U.S. adults think scientists contribute "a lot" to society.

A 2011 study on a national sample of US college students examined whether these students viewed the science / religion relationship as reflecting primarily conflict, collaboration, or independence. The study concluded that the majority of undergraduates in both the natural and social sciences do not see conflict between science and religion. Another finding in the study was that it is more likely for students to move away from a conflict perspective to an independence or collaboration perspective than towards a conflict view.

In the US, people who had no religious affiliation were no more likely than the religious population to have New Age beliefs and practices.

==== Other countries ====
A 2024 report by Pew on Hong Kong, Japan, South Korea, Taiwan and Vietnam found that though many in those countries are not affiliated with any religion, many of the unaffiliated still have beliefs in gods or unseen beings and engage in religious practices.

According to Pew in 2023, many unaffiliated Chinese believe in deities or other religious beliefs and participate in religious practices.

=== Darwinian evolution ===
Many studies have been undertaken on the various religions acceptance of the unifying theory for the scientific origins of life. In 2009, Pew Research Centre discovered that in the United States, 81% of Buddhists, 80% of Hindus, 77% of Jews, 72% of the Unaffiliated, 58% of Catholics, 54% of Orthodox, 51% of Mainline Protestant, 45% of Muslims, 28% of Black Protestants, 24% of Evangelicals, 22% of Mormons, and 8% of Jehovah's Witnesses accept evolution. In the same year, it was found that 87% of American scientists say that humans and other organisms evolved over time as a result of natural processes, which was around 32% for the general public.

Another report in 2014 showed that acceptance of evolution is highest in Agnostics at 96%, Atheists at 95%, Buddhists at 86%, Jews at 81%, Hindus at 80%, Nons/Nothing in Particular at 76%, Catholics at 66%, Mainline Protestants at 65%, Orthodox at 59%, Muslims at 53%, Black Protestants at 50%, Mormons at 42%, Evangelicals at 38%, and Jehovah's Witnesses at 20%. They also found that Christian religious traditions who agree with evolution are more likely to say God guided the process.

According to Gallup Poll in 2019, 40% of Americans held to a creationism within the last 10,000 years, but more were increasingly believing that humans evolved over millions of years with God's guidance (33%), or without involvement (22%).

Pew Research Centre (2020) studied Malaysia and Singapore, focusing on Muslims, Hindus, and Buddhists. Muslim interviewees viewed science and Islam as closely related, and they identified points of agreement. However, the theory of evolution was widely rejected, and seen as conflicting with the Islamic teaching of creation. Hindus held a similar view with Hinduism's relation to science, though they never viewed any conflict with Darwinian evolution. In contrast, Buddhists viewed Buddhism and science as being parallel, but non-overlapping domains, and there was an absence of any opposition to evolution.

The National Centre for Science Education (NCSE) reported that in 2021, for the first time the majority of the American public had reached above the half way mark for acceptance of biological evolution at 52%, while 36% rejected it and 12% were unsure. For the scientific community, the figure of acceptance was upwards of 98%. Research by Jon D. Miller in the same year showed that 34% of conservative Republicans accept evolution compared to 83% of liberal Democrats, with this divergence increasingly becoming politicized.

A 2023 global survey utilized over 2000 individuals from each of the seven countries (UK, USA, Argentina, Australia, Canada, Germany and Spain). They discovered that the majority of people, whether they were religious, spiritual, or not, accepted evolutionary science.

In Pew's 2023-24 Religious Landscape Study, in the United States of America they found that 97% of Agnostics, 95% of Atheists, 87% of Jews, 84% of Hindus, 84% of Buddhists, 83% of Mainline Protestants, 82% of Muslims, 81% of Nons/Nothing in particular, 81% of Mormons, 80% of Catholics, 78% of Black Protestants, 76% of Orthodox Christians, and 71% of Evangelicals believed in evolution.

== See also ==
- Conflict thesis
- Continuity thesis
- Deep ecology
- Demarcation problem
- Faith and rationality
- Issues in Science and Religion
- List of scholars on the relationship between religion and science
- Merton thesis
- Natural theology
- Philosophy of science
- Politicization of science
- Religious skepticism
- Psychology of religion
- Theistic evolution
- Western esotericism and science

By tradition:

- Baháʼí Faith and science
- Buddhism and science
- Catholic Church and science & Catholic Church and evolution
- Islam and science
- List of atheists in science and technology
- List of Catholic scientists
- List of Christians in science and technology
- List of nonreligious Nobel laureates
- Parson-naturalist
- Quakers in science

In the US:

- American Scientific Affiliation
- Center for Theology and the Natural Sciences
- Creation–evolution controversy
- Intelligent design
- John Templeton Foundation

== Sources ==
- Ackerman, Robert (1991). Introduction. A Prolegomena to the Study of Greek Religion. By Jane Ellen Harrison. Princeton University Press. doi:10.2307/j.ctv1ddczjt. hdl:2027/mdp.39015010471319. ISBN 978-0-691-01514-9.
- Barbour, Ian. When Science Meets Religion. San Francisco: Harper, 2000.
- Barbour, Ian. Religion and Science: Historical and Contemporary Issues. San Francisco: Harper, 1997. ISBN 0-06-060938-9
- Chu, Dominique (2013), The Science Myth – God, society, the self and what we will never know, ISBN 1-78279-047-0
- Drummond, Henry. Natural Law in the Spiritual World. London: Hodder & Stoughton Ltd, 29th Edition, 1890
- Grayling, A.C. (2014). The God Argument. Great Britain: Bloomsbury. ISBN 978-1-4088-3743-6.
- Haught, John F. Science & Religion: From Conflict to Conversation. Paulist Press, 1995. ISBN 0-8091-3606-6
- Jones, Richard H. For the Glory of God: The Role of Christianity in the Rise and Development of Modern Science. 2 Volumes. Lanham, Maryland: University Press of America, 2011 and 2012.
- Larson, Edward J. and Larry Witham. "Scientists are still keeping the faith" Nature Vol. 386, pp. 435–36 (3 April 1997)
- Larson, Edward J. and Larry Witham. "Leading scientists still reject God," Nature, Vol. 394, No. 6691 (1998), p. 313. online version
- Numbers, Ronald L. (2006). The Creationists: From Scientific Creationism to Intelligent Design (Expanded ed., 1st Harvard University Press pbk. ed.). Cambridge, MA: Harvard University Press. ISBN 978-0-674-02339-0. LCCN 2006043675. OCLC 69734583.
- Plott, C. (2000). Global History of Philosophy: The Period of Scholasticism. Motilal Banarsidass. ISBN 81-208-0551-8.
- Rashed, Roshdi (2007). "The Celestial Kinematics of Ibn al-Haytham". Arabic Sciences and Philosophy. 17. Cambridge University Press: 7–55. doi:10.1017/S0957423907000355. S2CID 170934544.
- Sardar, Ziauddin (1998). "Science in Islamic philosophy". Routledge Encyclopedia of Philosophy.
- Topdemir, Hüseyin Gazi (18 July 2007). Ibn al-Haytham (965–1039): His Life and Works.
- Vernet, J. (1996) [1960]. "Ibn al-Haytham". In Gibb, H. A. R.; Bearman, P. (eds.). Encyclopaedia of Islam (First ed.). Leiden: Brill Publishers. ISBN 978-90-04-16121-4.
- Einstein on Religion and Science from Ideas and Opinions (1954), Crown Publishers, ISBN 0-517-00393-7
- The Oxford Handbook of Religion and Science Philip Clayton(ed.), Zachary Simpson (associate-ed.) Hardcover 2006, paperback July 2008. Oxford University Press, 1023 pages
