= Arthur Peacocke =

English Anglican theologian and biochemist

The Reverend Arthur Peacocke MBE
- Born: Arthur Robert Peacocke; 29 November 1924; Watford, England
- Died: 21 October 2006 (aged 81); Oxford, England
- Spouse: Rosemary Mann (m. 1948)
- Children: Christopher Peacocke; Jane Brooke
- Awards: Templeton Prize (2001)

Ecclesiastical career
- Religion: Christianity (Anglican)
- Church: Church of England
- Ordained: 1971 (deacon · priest)

Academic background
- Education: Exeter College, Oxford; University of Birmingham
- Doctoral advisor: Sir Cyril Hinshelwood
- Influences: Ian Barbour; Geoffrey Lampe; Charles Raven; Pierre Teilhard de Chardin; William Temple

Academic work
- Discipline: Biochemistry; theology
- Sub-discipline: Molecular biology; physical biochemistry
- School or tradition: Theological critical realism
- Institutions: St Peter's College, Oxford; Mansfield College, Oxford; Clare College, Cambridge; Tulane University; St Cross College, Oxford
- Doctoral students: David Fell
- Main interests: Relationship between religion and science
- Notable works: Theology for a Scientific Age (1993)

Arthur Robert Peacocke MBE (29 November 1924 – 21 October 2006) was an English Anglican theologian and biochemist.

== Biography ==
Arthur Robert Peacocke was born in Watford, England, on 29 November 1924. He was educated at Watford Grammar School for Boys, Exeter College, Oxford (BA 1945, MA 1948, BSc 1947, DPhil 1948, DSc 1962, DD 1982), and the University of Birmingham (DipTh 1960, BD 1971).

He taught at the University of Birmingham from 1948 until 1959 when he was appointed University Lecturer in Biochemistry in the University of Oxford and Fellow and Tutor of St Peter's College. In 1960 he was licensed as a lay reader for the Diocese of Oxford and he held this position until 1971, when he was ordained deacon and priest, unusually, both in the same year.

From 1973 until 1984 he was Dean, Fellow, and Tutor and Director of Studies in Theology of Clare College, Cambridge, becoming a Doctor of Science by incorporation of the University of Cambridge.

In 1984 he spent one year as Professor of Judeo-Christian Studies at Tulane University in New Orleans. He returned to St Peter's College the following year, becoming Director of the Ian Ramsey Centre until 1988 and again from 1995 until 1999. He was appointed Honorary Chaplain of Christ Church, Oxford, in c. 1988 and Honorary Canon in 1994. Apart from one year during which he was Royden B. Davis Professor of Interdisciplinary Studies at Georgetown University (1994), he spent the rest of his life in Oxford, living in St John Street, just across the road from another eminent theologian, Henry Chadwick.

He had been Select Preacher before the University of Oxford in 1973 and 1975 and was Bampton Lecturer in 1978. He was Hulsean Preacher at Cambridge in 1976 and Gifford Lecturer at St Andrew's in 1993.

Among Peacocke's numerous subsidiary appointments he was the President of the Science and Religion Forum from 1995 until his death, having previous been chairman (1972–78) and Vice-President (1978–92). He became an academic fellow of the Institute on Religion in an Age of Science in 1986. He founded the Society of Ordained Scientists in c. 1986 and served as its first Warden from 1987 to 1992 and Warden Emeritus from 1992 until his death. He was also a sometime Vice-President of the Modern Church People's Union and member of the council of the European Society for the Study of Science and Theology.

Peacocke was awarded the Lecomte du Noüy Prize in 1983. He received honorary doctorates from DePauw University (DSc 1983) and Georgetown University (DLittHum 1991). He was appointed Member of the Order of the British Empire by Queen Elizabeth II in 1993. In 2001 he was awarded the Templeton Prize.

Arthur Peacocke married Rosemary Mann in 1948. They had a daughter, Jane (born 1953), and a son who is the distinguished philosopher Christopher Peacocke. They also have five grandchildren and three great-grandchildren.

Peacocke died on 21 October 2006 in Oxford.

== Research in biochemistry ==
Although Peacocke is best known today for his work in theology (see below) he also published more than eighty papers in biochemistry, particularly in relation to acridines, spectroscopy and enzymology.

== Peacocke's views ==
Peacocke self-identified as a panentheist, which he was careful to distinguish from being a pantheist.

He is perhaps best known for his attempts to argue rigorously that evolution and Christianity need not be at odds (see Creation–evolution controversy). He may be the most well-known theological advocate of theistic evolution as author of the essay "Evolution: The Disguised Friend of Faith?"

Arthur Peacocke describes a position which is referred to elsewhere as "front-loading", after the fact that it suggests that evolution is entirely consistent with an all-knowing, all-powerful God who exists throughout time, sets initial conditions and natural laws, and knows what the result will be. An implication of Peacocke's particular stance is that all scientific analyses of physical processes reveal God's actions. All scientific propositions are thus necessarily coherent with religious ones.

According to Peacocke, Darwinism is not an enemy to religion, but a friend (thus the title of his piece, "The Disguised Friend"). Peacocke offers five basic arguments in support of his position outlined below.

=== Process as immanence ===
The process-as-immanence argument is meant to deal with Phillip Johnson's contention that naturalism reduces God to a distant entity. According to Peacocke, God continuously creates the world and sustains it in its general order and structure; He makes things make themselves. Biological evolution is an example of this and, according to Peacocke, should be taken as a reminder of God's immanence. It shows us that "God is the Immanent Creator creating in and through the processes of natural order [italics in original]". Evolution is the continuous action of God in the world. All "the processes revealed by the sciences, especially evolutionary biology, are in themselves God-acting-as-Creator".

=== Chance optimising initial conditions ===
The chance-optimizing-initial-conditions argument runs as follows: the role of chance in biological evolution can be reconciled with a purposive creator because "there is a creative interplay of 'chance' and law apparent in the evolution of living matter by natural selection." There is no metaphysical implication of the physical fact of "chance"; randomness in mutation of DNA "does not, in itself, preclude these events from displaying regular trends of manifesting inbuilt propensities at the higher levels of organisms, populations and eco-systems." Chance is to be seen as "eliciting the potentialities that the physical cosmos possessed ab initio."

=== Random process of evolution as purposive ===
The random-process-of-evolution-as-purposive argument is perhaps best considered an adjunct to the process-as-immanence argument, and a direct response to Johnson's continued references to evolution as "purposeless". Peacocke suggests

that the evolutionary process is characterized by propensities towards increase in complexity, information-processing and –storage, consciousness, sensitivity to pain, and even self-consciousness… the actual physical form of the organisms in which these propensities are actualized and instantiated is contingent on the history of the confluence of disparate chains of events, including the survival of the mass extinctions that have occurred.

=== Natural evil as necessity ===
The natural-evil-as-necessity argument is meant to be a response to the classic philosophical argument of the problem of evil, which contends that an all-powerful, all-knowing and beneficent God cannot exist as such because natural evil (mudslides which crush the legs of innocent children, for instance) occurs. Peacocke contends that the capacities necessary for consciousness and thus a relationship with God also enable their possessors to experience pain, as necessary for identifying injury and disease. Preventing the experience of pain would prevent the possibility of consciousness. Peacocke also takes an eastern argument for natural evil of that which made must be unmade for a new making to occur; there is no creation without destruction. To Peacocke, it is necessary that organisms go out of existence for others to come into it. Thus, pain, suffering and death are necessary evils in a universe which will result in beings capable of having a relationship with God. God is said to suffer with His creation because He loves creation, conforming the deity to be consistent with the Christian God.

=== Jesus as pinnacle of human evolution ===
The Jesus-as-pinnacle-of-human-evolution argument proposed by Peacocke is that Jesus Christ is

the actualisation of [evolutionary] potentiality can properly be regarded as the consummation of the purposes of God already incompletely manifested in evolving humanity .... The paradigm of what God intends for all human beings, now revealed as having the potentiality of responding to, of being open to, of becoming united with, God.

Similar propositions had previously been put by writers such as C. S. Lewis (in Mere Christianity) and Teilhard de Chardin.

=== Relationship between theology and science typology ===
In the introduction to The Sciences and Theology in the Twentieth Century, Peacocke lists a set of eight relationships that could fall upon a two-dimensional grid. This list is in part a survey of deliberations that occurred at the World Council of Churches Conference on "Faith, Science and the Future", Cambridge, Massachusetts, 1979.

1. Science and theology are concerned with two distinct realms
  - Reality is thought of as a duality, operating within the human world, in terms of natural/supernatural, spatio-temporal/the eternal, the order of nature/the realm of faith, the natural (or physical)/the historical, the physical-and-biological/mind-and-spirit.
2. Science and theology are interacting approaches to the same reality
  - Accuracy of this view is widely and strongly resisted among those who otherwise differ in their theologies
3. Science and theology are two distinct non-interacting approaches to the same reality
  - The idea that theology tries to answer the question why, while science tries to answer the question how
4. Science and theology constitute two different language systems
  - Each are two distinct "language games" whose logical pre-conditions can have no bearing upon each other according to late-Wittgensteinian theory
5. Science and theology are generated by quite different attitudes (in their practitioners)
  - the attitude of science is that of objectivity and logical neutrality; that of theology personal involvement and commitment.
6. Science and theology are both subservient to their objects and can only be defined in relation to them
  - Both are intellectual disciplines shaped by their object (nature or God) to which they direct their attention. Both include a confessional and a rational factor.
7. Science and theology may be integrated
8. Science generates a metaphysic in terms of which theology is then formulated
  - For example, Alfred North Whitehead's metaphysics forms the basis of process theology

== See also ==
- Faculty of Theology and Religion, University of Oxford
- List of scholars on the relationship between religion and science
- Open theism
- Philosophical theology
- Religious naturalism
- Theological critical realism
- Theophysics

Academic offices
Preceded by Geoffrey Lampe	Bampton Lecturer; 1978	Succeeded by Anthony E. Harvey
Preceded by Roger Penrose	Gifford Lecturer at the University of St Andrews; 1992–1993	Succeeded by Nicholas Wolterstorff
Awards
Preceded by Freeman Dyson	Templeton Prize; 2001	Succeeded by John Polkinghorne
