= Issues in Science and Religion =

1966 book by Ian Barbour

- Author: Ian Barbour
- Subject: Relationship between religion and science
- Genre: Non-fiction
- Publisher: Prentice Hall
- Publication date: 1966
- ISBN: 0-334-00737-2
- OCLC: 17518056

Issues in Science and Religion is a book by Ian Barbour. A biography provided by the John Templeton Foundation and published by PBS online states this book "has been credited with literally creating the contemporary field of science and religion."

== Contents ==
The book is divided into three parts. The first part is concerned with the history of science and religion, the second with the methods of science and religion, and the third with the issues themselves.

Barbour provides introductions to several schools of philosophy in order to give the reader knowledge enough to understand how relations between science and religion look from these distinct viewpoints. The book also includes several specific, non-philosophical areas of science are employed in its discussion. Several specific concepts and objects are brought up in the discussion generally along with summaries of significant criticisms.

== Part 1: Religion and the History of Science ==
In this part Barbour provides an overview of how scientific discovery has influenced theology throughout the 17th, 18th, 19th and 20th centuries. The major scientific discoveries made in the 17th century included those made by Galileo and Newton. The scientific discoveries made by Galileo and Newton began to describe and explain the natural and physical laws by which the earth operates. These discoveries drastically changed the way that man viewed the world and nature. This in turn caused shifts in theological thought. Natural theology emerged, where God was able to fill the scientific gaps and was responsible for the orderliness of nature. The idea of God as the "Divine Clockmaker" and the beginning of Deism can also be traced back to the 17th century.

During the 18th century the Age of Reason and Romanticism greatly shaped views on science and theology. Deism became very popular during this time among many Enlightenment scholars. Romanticism, on the other hand, led to an appreciation of the underlying spirituality in nature and in man, and God's personal relationship with man and nature. This in turn led to the concepts of moral and religious experience, which focused on man's intuition and imagination in relation to their religious experience.

The theory of evolution was developed by Darwin in the 19th century. This essentially eliminated the "God of the gaps" that had come about in the 17th century. Liberal theologians accepted the theory of evolution, and held the opinion that God works continuously through the evolutionary process. On the other hand, conservatives still insisted on Biblical literalism, and they rejected Darwin's theory. For the most part theologians began to focus more on the human experience for their basis of theology.

In the next two parts of the book, Barbour goes into details of the 20th century.

== Part 2: Religion and the Methods of Science ==
In this section a whole chapter is devoted to the methods of scientific discovery. Barbour asserts that scientific discovery is based on a critical realism, where it is recognized that scientific theory is not infallible in itself but is based on universal truths. Due to this line of thinking, as scientific knowledge changes an overall advance is made. The next chapter compares the study of science to the study of history. This chapter focuses on the objectivity of science versus the subjectivity of history. History is seen as subjective because one is dealing with the humanities and there is a level of personal involvement. Although throughout history certain patterns of human behavior emerge, these patterns are never entirely predictable or repeatable. Where in science, all events that are observed must be repeatable and produce the same results in order to uphold natural laws. The following chapter examines the methods of religion. In this chapter some comparisons are made between the methods of science and the methods of religion, in particular regarding experience, community and the use of models to explain an event or concept. Although there are parallels between the methods of science and religion, there are also difference. One major difference is the same as the difference between science and history. Like history, religion is subjective due to the personal involvement required of religion. The final chapter of this section discusses the language used in religion and science. This chapter asserts that although there are many similarities in the methods and language of science and religion, the two subjects remain distinctly different in their purposes.

== Part 3: Religion and the Theory of Science ==
The first chapter in this section examines contemporary physics, in particular indeterminacy as shown in the Heisenberg Uncertainty Principle. This indeterminacy in the behavior of atoms can be generalized to apply to humanity as a whole. This argument rests on the unpredictability of a single person and their action. Barbour concludes this chapter by stating that although physics can be used to explain human freedom to some extent, it will never produce an entirely satisfactory argument for it. The next chapter addresses how the idea that man is simply a machine that can be broken up into respective systems and thus is completely predictable, is not satisfactory in the scientific world. It can be seen through science and the study of DNA, that each human has a unique identity and sense of selfhood. This is supported biblically, in that God's love for each human being is unique to that person. The next chapter expresses varying viewpoints on creation and evolution, from conservative to liberal theology. In more conservative lines of thought biblical literalism points to the creation of man as a divine point in creation, and therefore rejects the idea of man evolving from other life forms. The liberal side of theology embraces the theory of evolution, and incorporates it with scripture into a doctrine of continuing creation. The final chapter in this book examines God's relation to nature. There are many different views on how God is related to nature. Those who hold more conservative views believe in God's sovereignty over nature. Others look at God's role in nature through a historical context, where God has evoked certain responses in nature throughout the course of time.

== See also ==
- Relationship between religion and science
- List of science and religion scholars
