= Martinez Hewlett =

Martinez "Marty" Joseph Hewlett (born December 6, 1942) is professor emeritus of Molecular and Cellular Biology at the University of Arizona. He received his PhD in 1973 and served in David Baltimore's laboratory. His specialty is researching Bunyaviridae. He is an adjunct professor at the Dominican School of Philosophy and Theology of the Graduate Theological Union and a lay member of the Dominican Order. Hewlett has written two books on the relationship between science and religion with Ted Peters, as well as the novel Sangre de Cristo: A Novel of Science and Faith, republished as Divine Blood.
