= Ted Peters (theologian) =

American Lutheran theologian (born 1941)

The Reverend Ted Peters
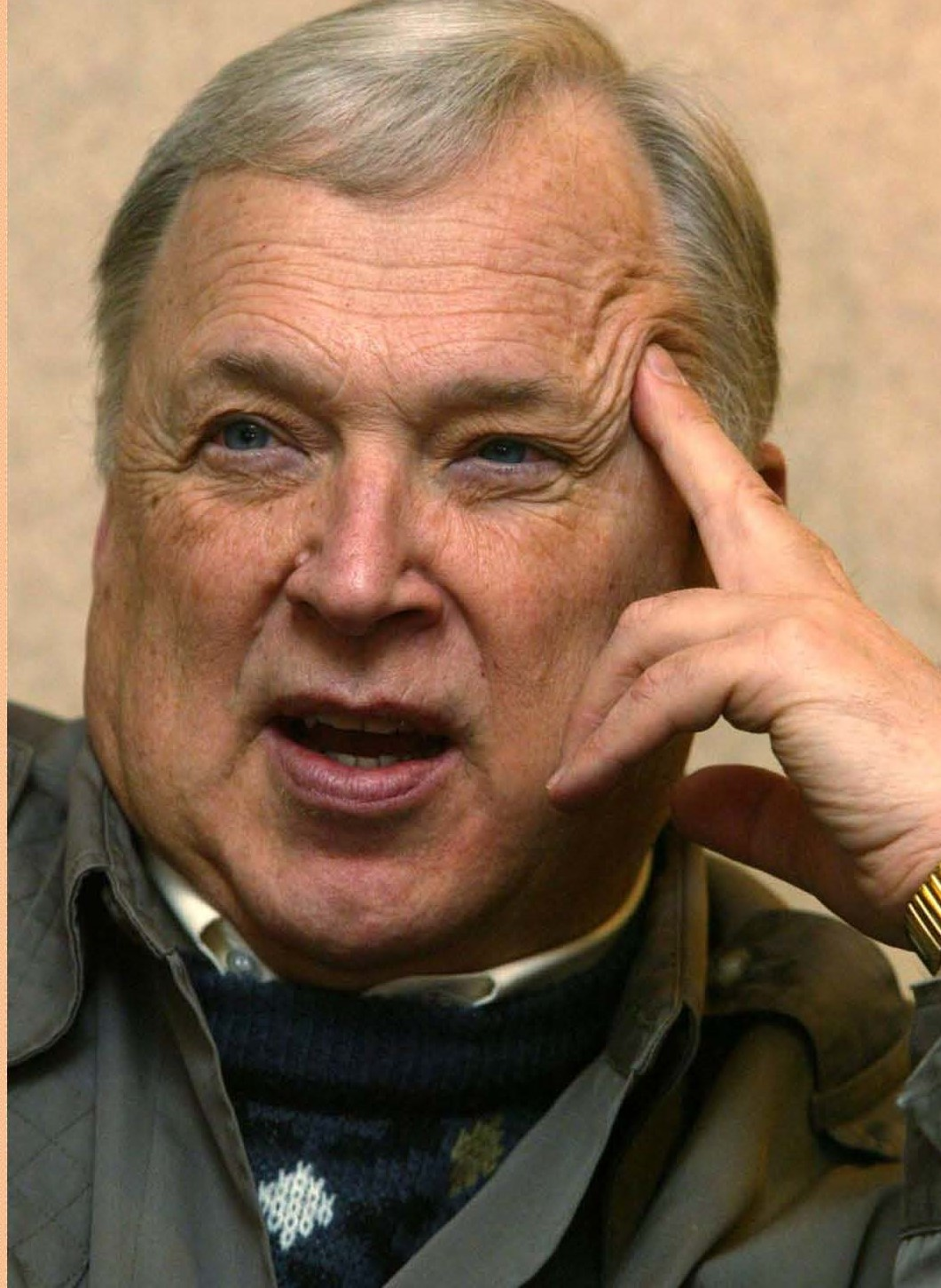
- Born: April 3, 1941 (age 85)

Ecclesiastical career
- Religion: Christianity (Lutheran)
- Church: Evangelical Lutheran Church in America

Academic background
- Education: Michigan State University; Trinity Lutheran Seminary; University of Chicago
- Influences: Wolfhart Pannenberg

Academic work
- Discipline: Theology
- Sub-discipline: Systematic theology
- Institutions: Newberry College; Loyola University New Orleans; Pacific Lutheran Theological Seminary
- Website: tedstimelytake.com

Theodore Frank Peters (born 1941), known as Ted Peters, is an American Lutheran theologian and Emeritus Professor of Systematic Theology and Ethics at Pacific Lutheran Theological Seminary and the Graduate Theological Union. In addition to his work as a theologian and educator, he is a prolific author and editor on Christian theology, Public Theology, the interaction of science and religion, bioethics, and space ethics. He is the former editor of Dialog, a quarterly scholarly magazine of modern and postmodern theology, and now co-editor of Theology and Science. Peters also serves on the Advisory Council of METI (Messaging Extraterrestrial Intelligence). Ted Peters also writes fiction, espionage thrillers featuring a female inner city pastor, Leona Foxx. He received a BA from Michigan State University, an M.Div. from Trinity Lutheran Seminary, and an MA and Ph.D. from the University of Chicago.

== Fiction ==
- For God and Country Apocryphile (2015)
- Cyrus Twelve Apocryphile (2018)
- The Moon Turns to Blood Apocryphile (2019)

== Publications ==
- Astrobiology: Science, Ethics, and Public Policy eds., Octavio Chon-Torres, Ted Peters, Joseph Seckbach, Russell Gordon Wiley (2021)
- God in the Natural World: Theological Explorations in Appreciation of Denis Edwards eds., Ted Peters and Marie Turner ATF Press (2020)
- AI and IA: Utopia or Extinction? ed., Ted Peters ATF Press (2019)
- Astrotheology: Where Science and Theology Meet ETI eds., Ted Peters, Martinez Hewlett, Joshua Moritz, Robert John Russell (2018)
- Theologians in Their Own Words, eds., Ted Peters, Derek Nelson, Joshua Moritz Fortress (2013)
- Anticipating God's New Creation: Essays in Honor of Ted Peters eds., Carol R. Jacobson and Adam W. Prior (2015)
- God in Cosmic History Anselm Academic (2017)
- Sin Boldly! Justifying Faith for Fragile and Broken Souls Fortress (2015)
- God--The World's Future: Systematic Theology for a Postmodern Era 3rd ed. Fortress (2015)
- UFOs--God's Chariots? 2nd ed. Career Press New Page Books (2015)
- The Evolution of Evil. Co-edited with Gaymon Bennett, Martinez J. Hewlett, Robert John Russell (2008). Vandenhoeck & Ruprecht. ISBN 3-525-56979-3
- Sacred Cells? Why Christians Should Support Stem Cell Research with Karen Lebacqz and Gaymon Bennett (2008)
- The Evolution of Terrestrial and Extraterrestrial Life: Where in the World is God? (2008)
- The Stem Cell Debate (2007)
- Anticipating Omega (2006)
- Can You Believe in God and Evolution? A Guide For the Perplexed with Martinez Hewlett (2006)
- The Gift of Grace: the Future of Lutheran Theology (editor) with Niels Henrik Gregersen and Bo Holm (2004)
- Evolution from Creation to New Creation: Conflict, Conversation, and Convergence with Martinez Hewt (2003)
- God, Life, and the Cosmos: Christian and Islamic Perspectives (editor) with Muzaffar Iqbal and Syed Nomanul Haq (2003)
- Bridging Science and Religion (editor) with Gaymon Bennett (2003)
- Science and Theology: The New Consonance (editor) (1999)
- For the Love of Children: Genetic Technology and the Future of the Family (1996)
- Playing God? Genetic Determinism and Human Freedom (1996, 2nd edition 2002)
- Sin: Radical Evil In Soul and Society (1994)
- God as Trinity: Relationality and Temporality in Divine Life (1993)
- Toward a Theology of Nature: Essays on Science and Faith with Wolfhart Pannenberg (1993)
- GOD - The World's Future (1992, 2nd edition 2002, 3rd edition 2016)
- The Cosmic Self (1990)
- Cosmos as Creation (1989)
- Fear, Faith and the Future (1980)
- Futures Human and Divine (1978)

== See also ==
- Astrobiology
- Astrotheology
- Digital theology – Study of the relationship between theology and digital technology
