= Theological critical realism =

In theology, critical realism is an epistemological position adopted by a community of scientists turned theologians. They are influenced by the scientist turned philosopher Michael Polanyi. Polanyi's ideas were taken up enthusiastically by T. F. Torrance, whose work in this area has influenced many theologians calling themselves critical realists. This community includes John Polkinghorne, Ian Barbour, and Arthur Peacocke.

== Overview ==
The aim of the group is to show that the language of science and Christian theology are similar, forming a starting point for a dialogue between the two. Alister McGrath and Wentzel van Huyssteen (the latter of Princeton Theological Seminary) are recent contributors to this strand. The New Testament scholar N. T. Wright also writes on this topic:

... I propose a form of critical realism. This is a way of describing the process of "knowing" that acknowledges the reality of the thing known, as something other than the knower (hence "realism"), while fully acknowledging that the only access we have to this reality lies along the spiralling path of appropriate dialogue or conversation between the knower and the thing known (hence "critical").

Wright's fellow biblical scholar, James Dunn, encountered the thought of Bernard Lonergan as mediated through Ben F. Meyer. Much of North American critical realism—later used in the service of theology—has its source in the thought of Lonergan rather than Polanyi.

== See also ==
- Christian Smith (sociologist) – American sociologist
- Critical realism (philosophy of perception)
- Critical realism (philosophy of the social sciences)
- Physico-theology – Theology reliant on rational and empirical arguments
- Subtle realism
- Thomas F. Torrance – Scottish Protestant theologian (1913–2007)
- Theistic science
