= Ian Barbour =

American academic (1923–2013)

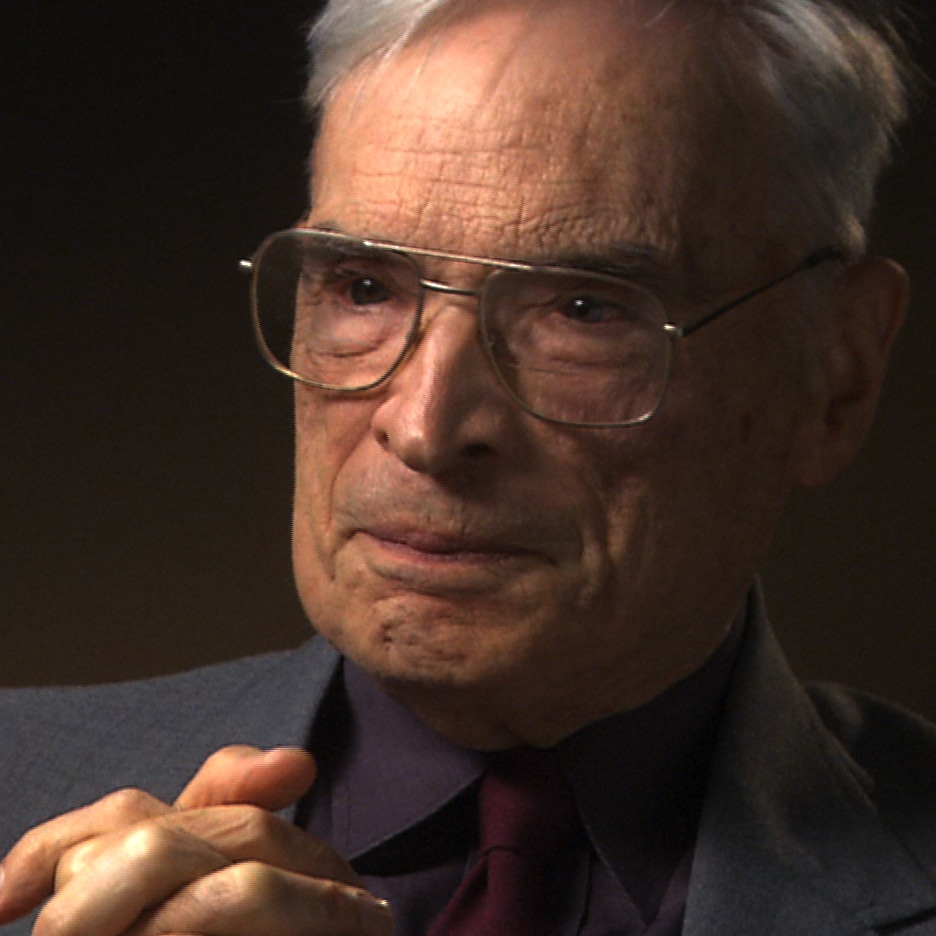
- Ian Barbour in a Closer To Truth interview
- Born: Ian Graeme Barbour; October 5, 1923; Beijing, China
- Died: December 24, 2013 (aged 90); Minneapolis, Minnesota, US
- Spouse: Deane Kern (m. 1947; died 2011)
- Awards: Templeton Prize (1999)

Academic background
- Education: Swarthmore College (BS); Duke University (MS); University of Chicago (PhD); Yale University (BDiv)
- Thesis: Magnetic Deflection of Cosmic-ray Mesons Using Nuclear Plates (1950)

Academic work
- Discipline: Physics; religious studies; science and technology studies
- Sub-discipline: Particle physics
- School or tradition: Process theology; theological critical realism
- Institutions: Carleton College
- Main interests: Relationship between religion and science
- Notable works: Issues in Science and Religion (1966)
- Notable ideas: Theological critical realism
- Influenced: Arthur Peacocke; John Polkinghorne

Ian Graeme Barbour (October 5, 1923 – December 24, 2013) was an American scholar on the relationship between science and religion. According to the Public Broadcasting Service, his mid-1960s Issues in Science and Religion "has been credited with literally creating the contemporary field of science and religion."

In the citation nominating Barbour for the 1999 Templeton Prize, John B. Cobb wrote, "No contemporary has made a more original, deep, and lasting contribution toward the needed integration of scientific and religious knowledge and values than Ian Barbour. With respect to the breadth of topics and fields brought into this integration, Barbour has no equal."

== Biography ==
Barbour was born on October 5, 1923, in Beijing, China, the second of three sons of an American Episcopal mother (who was the daughter of the obstetrician Robert Latou Dickinson) and a Scottish Presbyterian father. His family left China in 1931, and Barbour spent the remainder of his youth in the United States and England. A conscientious objector, he served in the Civilian Public Service for three years during the Second World War.

He received his Bachelor of Science degree in physics from Swarthmore College and his Master of Science degree in physics from Duke University in 1946. In 1950, he received a Doctor of Philosophy degree in physics from the University of Chicago, where he worked as a teaching assistant to Enrico Fermi. He earned a Bachelor of Divinity degree in 1956 from Yale University's Divinity School.

Barbour taught at Carleton College beginning in 1955 with a joint appointment in the departments of physics and philosophy. He began teaching religion full-time in 1960, when the university established a religion department. In the 1970s, he co-founded of the Science, Technology, and Public Policy program at Carleton, which later became the Environment and Technology Studies program. He retired in 1986 as the Winifred and Atherton Bean Professor Emeritus of Science, Technology and Society.

Barbour gave the Gifford lectures from 1989 to 1991 at the University of Aberdeen. These lectures led to the book Religion in an Age of Science. He was awarded the Templeton Prize in 1999 for Progress in Religion in recognition of his efforts to create a dialogue between the worlds of science and religion.

Barbour was married to Deane Kern from 1947 until her death in 2011. They had four children.

Barbour suffered a stroke on December 20, 2013, at his home in Northfield, Minnesota, and remained in a coma at Abbott Northwestern Hospital until his death four days later.

== Philosophy and theology ==
In his efforts to link science and religion in Issues in Science and Religion, Barbour coined the term critical realism. This has been adopted by other scholars. He claimed the basic structure of religion is similar to that of science in some ways but also differs on some crucial points. They are part of the same spectrum in which both display subjective as well as objective features. The subjective includes the theory on data, the resistance of comprehensive theories to falsification, and the absence of rules for choice among paradigms. Objective features include the presence of common data, evidence for or against a theory, and criteria which are not paradigm-dependent. The presence of subjective and objective features in both science and religion makes his thinking valuable and original. Barbour's arguments have been developed in significant and diverse ways by a variety of scholars, including Arthur Peacocke, John Polkinghorne, Sallie McFague, and Robert John Russell. His subjective/objective approach is prominent in the evolving paradigm of religious naturalism.

Barbour considered critical realism an alternative to the competing interpretations of scientific theories: classical or naive realism, instrumentalism, and idealism. A critical realist perspective sees scientific theories yielding partial, revisable, abstract, but referential knowledge of the world that can be expressed through metaphors and models.

During the 1970s, Barbour presented a program of interdisciplinary courses that dealt with ethical issues in the applications of science, exploring the social and environmental consequences of a variety of technologies. In 2000, in When Science Meets Religion (2000) he used a fourfold typology (Conflict, Independence, Dialogue, Integration) to relate religion and science that he had developed in his earlier writings. In his works, Barbour writes from a Christian perspective.

Barbour compared methods of inquiry in science and religion, and has explored the theological implications of the natural and social sciences. He also has lectured widely on ethical issues in such fields as climate change, technology policy, energy, agriculture, computers, and cloning.

American academic Forrest Clingerman ties Barbour to the religious naturalism movement via his theology of nature. His subjective/objective approach to religion is prominent in this evolving paradigm. Michael Dowd calls Barbour the grandfather of the evolutionary Christianity movement.

In his acceptance speech for the 1999 Templeton Prize, Barbour spoke about the need to break down barriers, using cloning as an example of science's ability to say what is possible and of religion to reflect on what is desirable.

== Bibliography ==
- Christianity & the Scientists (1960)
- Issues in Science and Religion (1966)
- Science & Religion (1968)
- Science & Secularity: The Ethics of Technology (1970)
- Review of Science & Secularity with discussion of other books from Journal of Religion
- Myths, Models and Paradigms (1974), ISBN 0-334-01037-3
- Religion in an Age of Science (1990), ISBN 0-06-060383-6
- Ethics in an Age of Technology (1993), ISBN 0-06-060935-4
- Foreword in Religion & Science: History, Method, Dialogue (1996), W. Mark Richardson (ed.) and Wesley J. Wildman (ed.), ISBN 0-415-91667-4
- Religion and Science: Historical and Contemporary Issues (1997) ISBN 0-06-060938-9 (revised and expanded version of Religion in an Age of Science)
- When Science Meets Religion, (2000), ISBN 0-06-060381-X
- Nature, Human Nature, and God (2002), ISBN 0-281-05545-9

== See also ==
- List of scholars on the relationship between religion and science

Academic offices
Preceded by	Gifford Lecturer at the University of Aberdeen; 1989–1991	Succeeded by Jaroslav Pelikan
Awards
Preceded by Sir Sigmund Sternberg	Templeton Prize; 1999	Succeeded by Freeman Dyson
