= Society of Ordained Scientists =

- Abbreviation: SOSc
- Formation: 1986
- Type: Anglican religious order
- Founder: Arthur Peacocke
- Website: ordainedscientists.wordpress.com

The Society of Ordained Scientists (SOSc) is an international religious order of priest-scientists within the Anglican Communion. The organisation was founded at the University of Oxford by biologist-theologian Arthur Peacocke following the establishment of several other similar societies in the 1970s, in order to advance the field of religion and science. Membership in the Society of Ordained Scientists is open at the invitation of the Warden to ordained ministers of any Christian denomination upholding belief in the Holy Trinity. As a result, the ecumenical religious order includes individuals from the Anglican Church, Catholic Church, Methodist Church, Eastern Orthodox Church, Reformed Church, and Lutheran Church, among other Christian denominations.

== See also ==
- American Scientific Affiliation
- Christians in Science
- Veritas Forum
