= John F. Haught =

American theologian

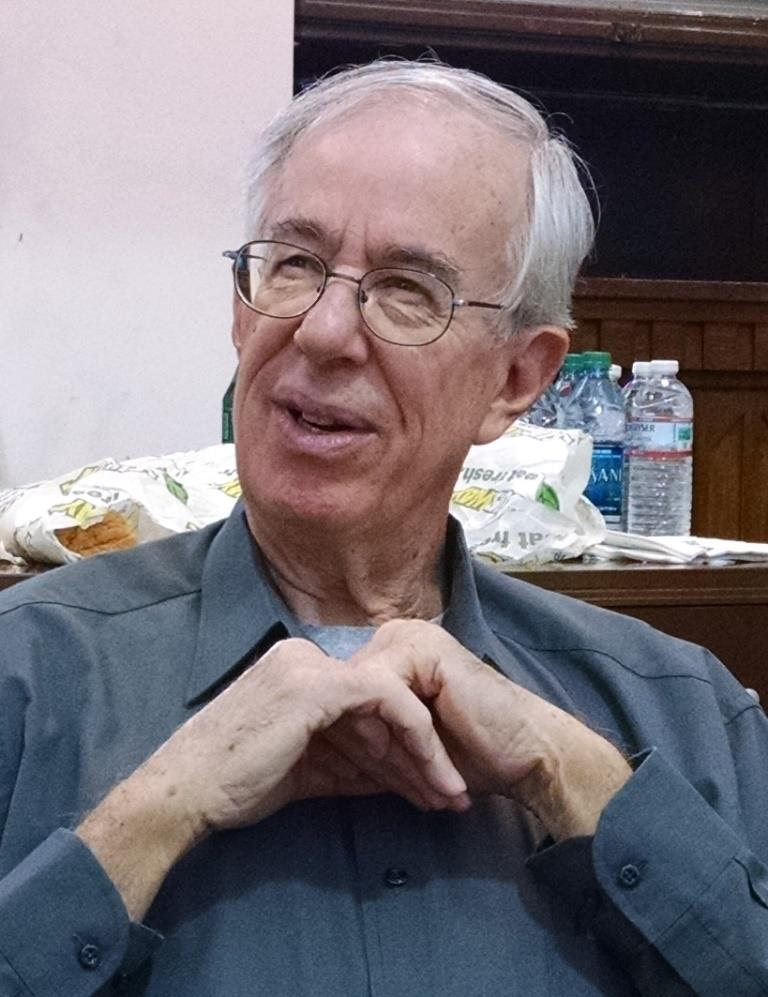
Theologian John F. Haught of Georgetown University

John F. Haught is an American theologian. He is a Distinguished Research Professor at Georgetown University. He specializes in Roman Catholic systematic theology, with a particular interest in issues pertaining to physical cosmology, evolutionary biology, geology, and Christianity.

He has authored numerous books and articles, including Science and Faith: A New Introduction (2012), Making Sense of Evolution: Darwin, God, and The Drama of Life ( 2010), God and the New Atheism: A Critical Response to Dawkins, Harris, and Hitchens (2008), Christianity and Science: Toward a Theology of Nature (2007), Is Nature Enough? Meaning and Truth in the Age of Science (2006), Purpose, Evolution and the Meaning of Life (2004), God After Darwin: A Theology of Evolution (2000, 2nd ed. 2007), Science and Religion: From Conflict to Conversation (1995), The Promise of Nature: Ecology and Cosmic Purpose (1993, 2nd ed. 2004), What is Religion? (1990), What is God? (1986), and The Cosmic Adventure: Science, Religion and the Quest for Purpose (1984).

In 2002, Haught received the Owen Garrigan Award in Science and Religion, in 2004 the Sophia Award for Theological Excellence, and in 2008 a "Friend of Darwin Award" from the National Center for Science Education. He also testified for the plaintiffs in Harrisburg, PA “Intelligent Design Trial”(Kitzmiller et al. vs. Dover Board of Education).

== Life ==
John F. Haught was born on November 12, 1942, to Paul and Angela Haught. His wife is Evelyn.

== Academic career and systemic theology ==
Haught graduated from St. Mary's Seminary and University in Baltimore in 1964 and subsequently received his PhD in theology from The Catholic University of America in Washington, D.C., in 1968 (Dissertation: Foundations of the Hermeneutics of Eschatology).

From 1969 to 2005 Haught taught in the Department of Theology at Georgetown University in Washington, D.C., serving as theology department chair between 1990 and 1995. In addition, he has been a Landegger Distinguished Professor and Thomas Healey Distinguished Professor, and held the D’Angelo Chair in Humanities at St. John's University (2008), and was visiting professor at the Pontifical Gregorian University in Rome (2010).

=== Inspiration and influence ===
In his early 20s, John Haught started reading the works of the Jesuit priest and geologist Pierre Teilhard de Chardin. As an undergraduate student at St. Mary's Seminary and University, Haught had majored in philosophy and completed graduate work in philosophical theology, though he was never ordained. While teaching science and religion at Georgetown University and writing books on the topic, he specialized in the areas of cosmology and biology. During his studies, he concluded that Thomistic metaphysics could not adequately contextualize the discoveries of evolutionary biology and Big Bang physics. As the intellectual backbone of his courses, he turned to science-friendly 20th century philosophers such as Alfred North Whitehead, Michael Polanyi, Bernard Lonergan, and Hans Jonas. His books Science and Religion: From Conflict to Conversation (1995) and more recently Science and Faith: a New Introduction (2012) reflect an approach developed over many years of teaching at Georgetown University.

During the 1990s, he became increasingly involved in issues relating to evolution, especially because of their growing importance in the intellectual world and the claims by creationists and prominent evolutionists alike that Darwinian science and belief in God are irreconcilable. The American cultural warfare over the teaching of intelligent design led Haught to write such books as God After Darwin, Deeper than Darwin, and Making Sense of Evolution. These and other works have led to numerous lectures on theology and evolution nationally and internationally. In his works, John Haught argues that an open-minded search for intelligibility requires a plurality of distinct “horizons of inquiry,” allowing for the harmonious cohabitation of science (including evolutionary biology) and religious belief. Haught views science and religion as two different and noncompeting levels of explanation, asserting that "science and religion cannot logically stand in a competitive relationship with each other."

In 2005, Haught testified on behalf of the plaintiffs at the Harrisburg PA trial against the teaching of Intelligent Design in public schools. His testimony earned him the “Friend of Darwin” award from the National Center for Science Education.

=== Science and religion ===
John Haught's lectures and works focus on a vision of reality that provides room for both scientific inquiry and a biblical understanding of God. In Haught's perspective, everything should be open to scientific study, including human intelligence, ethical aspiration, and religion. Haught posits that science is one of many avenues to providing a fruitful understanding of nature since there are distinct and noncompeting levels of explaining all natural phenomena. By allowing for different reading levels, one can avoid the conflation of science and religion whereby physics spills into metaphysics, or evolutionary biology into a whole worldview. According to Haught, a major obstacle to adopting a plurality of reading levels is the persistence of biblical literalism which erroneously looks to the Bible as a source of scientific truth. In his view, approaching ancient religious texts with modern scientific expectations is the source of unnecessary and anachronistic confusion that makes the Bible, and the biblically based faith traditions, seem incompatible with modern science. In works, such as God and the New Atheism, Haught aims to show that Daniel Dennett, Christopher Hitchens, Richard Dawkins, and Jerry Coyne have adopted the same misplaced biblical literalism as their creationist opponents. Haught disputes the contention of New Atheists that God is a quasi-scientific hypothesis now rendered obsolete by modern cosmology, geology, and evolutionary biology. Emphasizing that science and theology represent two distinct horizons for looking at the story of life and the universe, Haught argues in his various lectures and writings that “it is the mission of a theology of nature to integrate them into a synthetic vision wherein differences do not dissolve but instead contribute in distinct ways to the larger and longer human quest for meaning and truth.”

Haught emphasizes that theology looks for levels of meaning and truth that scientific method is not wired to receive. “Theology has its own horizon of inquiry. It is grounded in a qualitatively distinct set of questions from those asked by scientists and ethicists. The data that give rise to distinctively theological questions include an easily recognizable set of beliefs and ethical commitments that do not show up within the horizon of scientific inquiry, but which every scientist must embrace in order to do science at all.

1. Belief (faith or trust) that the world, including the horizon of scientific inquiry, is intelligible.
2. Belief that truth is worth seeking.
3. Belief that honesty, humility, generosity, and openness in sharing one’s ideas and discoveries are unconditionally right (and hence that the pursuit of virtue is not irrelevant to successful scientific work.)
4. Belief that one’s own mind has the capacity to grasp intelligibility and to distinguish what is true from what is false.”

=== Recognition and awards ===
Haught was the winner of the 2002 Owen Garrigan Award in Science and Religion and the 2004 Sophia Award for Theological Excellence. In 2009, in recognition of his work on theology and science, Haught was awarded the degree of Doctor Honoris Causa by the University of Louvain and the Friend of Darwin Award from the National Center for Science Education.

=== Peer evaluations ===
In the May 25 - June 1, 2015 issue of America: The National Catholic Review, Robert E. Lauder, Professor of Philosophy at St. John's University, provided a review of John Haught's works, including, What is God? How to Think About the Divine (1986), God After Darwin: A Theology of Evolution, and Mystery and Promise.

Other expert evaluations of the works of John Haught include Carter Phipps, the author of Evolutionaries: Unlocking the Spiritual and Cultural Potential of Science’s Greatest Idea (2012). Phipps’ article, “A Theologian of Renewal”, won a Gold Folio award for editorial excellence.

Dr. Haught's latest book is The New Cosmic Story, Inside Our Awakening Universe (New Haven: Yale University Press, 2017) about the emergence of religious consciousness in the long cosmic process. Forbes Magazine called The New Cosmic Story the “Book of the year.”

== Kitzmiller et al. vs. Dover Board of Education Expert Witness Testimony ==
Haught testified as an expert witness for the plaintiffs in the case of Kitzmiller v. Dover Area School District. He testified that the effect of the intelligent design policy adopted by the Dover School board would "be to compel public school science teachers to present their students in biology class information that is inherently religious, not scientific in nature." He also testified that materialism, the philosophy that only matter exists, is "a belief system, no less a belief system than is intelligent design. And as such, it has absolutely no place in the classroom, and teachers of evolution should not lead their students craftily or explicitly to ... feel that they have to embrace a materialistic world-view in order to make sense of evolution."

== Debates, lectures, and writings ==
Haught has participated in several public debates about the compatibility of science and religion, sharing the stage with Daniel Dennett at the City University of New York in 2009, Kenneth Miller at the New York Academy of Sciences in 2011, Taking issue in the letter with Coyne's characterization, Haught's opposition to the release and Coyne's final list of Catholic "evils" as a way to end the presentation, Haught explained that he sought to "protect the public from such a preposterous and logic-offending ... presentation."

== Books ==
- Nature and Purpose, 1980, University Press of America, ISBN 0-8191-1258-5, 0-8191-1257-7
- The Cosmic Adventure: Science, Religion and the Quest for Purpose, 1984, Paulist Press, ISBN 0-8091-2599-4
- What Is God?: How to Think about the Divine, 1986, Paulist Press, ISBN 0-8091-2754-7
- What Is Religion: An Introduction, 1990, Paulist Press, ISBN 0-8091-3117-X
- Science & Religion: From Conflict to Conversation, 1995, Paulist Press, ISBN 0-8091-3606-6
- Science and Religion: In Search of Cosmic Purpose, 2000, Georgetown University Press 2001 reprint: ISBN 0-87840-865-7
- God After Darwin: A Theology of Evolution, 2000, Westview Press 2001 reprint: ISBN 0-8133-3878-6

- 2nd Edition of God After Darwin: A Theology of Evolution, 2008, ISBN 0-8133-4370-4

- Responses to 101 Questions on God and Evolution, 2001, Paulist Press, ISBN 0-8091-3989-8
- In Search of a God for Evolution: Paul Tillich and Pierre Teilhard de Chardin, 2002, American Teilhard Association, ISBN 0-89012-088-9
- Deeper Than Darwin: The Prospect for Religion in the Age of Evolution, 2003, Westview Press, hardcover: ISBN 0-8133-6590-2, paperback: ISBN 0-8133-4199-X
- The Promise of Nature: Ecology and Cosmic Purpose, 2004, Wipf & Stock Publishers, ISBN 1-59244-945-X
- Is Nature Enough?: Meaning and Truth in the Age of Science, May 2006, Cambridge University Press, ISBN 0-521-60993-3
- God and the New Atheism: A Critical Response to Dawkins, Harris, and Hitchens, December 2007, Westminster John Knox Press, ISBN 978-0-664-23304-4
- Christianity and Science: Toward a Theology of Nature, 2007, Orbis Books, ISBN 978-1-57075-740-2
- Making Sense of Evolution: Darwin, God and the Drama of Life, February 2010, Westminster John Knox Press, ISBN 978-0-664-23285-6
- Resting on the Future, Catholic Theology for an Unfinished Universe, 2015, Bloomsbury Academic, ISBN 978-1-5013-0621-1
- The New Cosmic Story, Inside Our Awakening Universe, 2017, Yale University Press, ISBN 978-0-300-21703-2
- God after Einstein, What's Really Going on in the Universe, 2022, Yale University Press, ISBN 978-0-300-25119-7
