= Physical biochemistry =

Study of the physical chemistry of biomolecules

Physical biochemistry is a branch of biochemistry that deals with the theory, techniques, and methodology used to study the physical chemistry of biomolecules. It also deals with the mathematical approaches for the analysis of biochemical reaction and the modelling of biological systems. It provides insight into the structure of macromolecules, and how chemical structure influences the physical properties of a biological substance.

It involves the use of physics, physical chemistry principles, and methodology to study biological systems. It employs various physical chemistry techniques such as chromatography, spectroscopy, Electrophoresis, X-ray crystallography, electron microscopy, and hydrodynamics.

== See also ==
- Physical chemistry
