= Theology and Science =

- Discipline: Theology
- Language: English
- Edited by: Ted Peters and Robert John Russell

Publication details
- Publisher: Routledge on behalf of the Center for Theology and the Natural Sciences

Standard abbreviations
- ISO 4: Theol. Sci.

Indexing
- ISSN: 1474-6700 (print); 1474-6719 (web)

Links
- Journal homepage

Theology and Science is the journal of the Center for Theology and the Natural Sciences. It has a stated dedication to peer-reviewed articles on religion and science. The co-editors are Ted Peters and Robert John Russell. It is published by Routledge. The first volume was published in 2003.

== Abstracting and indexing ==
The journal is indexed and abstracted in the following bibliographic databases:

- Academic Search Premier
- Arts and Humanities Citation Index
- IBZ Online
- International Bibliography of the Social Sciences
- Scopus
- Science Citation Index Expanded
