= Robert John Russell =

American physicist and theologian

- Known for: Founder and Director of the Center for Theology and the Natural Sciences

Robert John Russell is founder and Director of the Center for Theology and the Natural Sciences (CTNS). He is also the Ian G. Barbour Professor of Theology and Science in Residence at the Graduate Theological Union (GTU). He has written and edited extensively on possible scientific mechanisms of Christian belief.

Russell is an ordained minister in the United Church of Christ. He received a Ph.D. in physics from the University of California, Santa Cruz, a B.S. in physics from Stanford University, an M.S. in physics from UCLA, and an M.A. in Theology and an M. Div. from Pacific School of Religion. Russell taught physics at Carleton College and science and religion with Ian Barbour for several years before joining the GTU in 1981. His wife, Charlotte, is an associate minister at First Congregational Church, Berkeley, California.

== Ideas ==
From 1984 to the present, Robert John Russell has published papers exploring consonance and dissonance between modern physics, evolutionary biology and Christian theology.

He is the Principal Investigator of "STARS: Science and Transcendence Advanced Research Series".

In God’s Action in Nature’s World: Essays in Honour of Robert John Russell, 15 writers on the interaction between theology and science analysed their views of Russell’s contribution to the subject.

== Works ==
- Cosmology, Evolution, and Resurrection Hope: Theology and Science in Creative Mutual Interaction. London: Pandora Press. 2006. ISBN 1-894710-67-3.
- Cosmology from Alpha to Omega. Minneapolis: Fortress Press. 2008. ISBN 978-0-8006-6273-8.
- Time in Eternity: Pannenberg, Physics, and Eschatology in Creative Mutual Interaction. Notre Dame, IN: University of Notre Dame Press. 2012. ISBN 978-0268040598.

Editor

- Fifty Years in Science and Religion: Ian G. Barbour and His Legacy. Aldershot: Ashgate. 2004. ISBN 0-7546-4117-1.

Coeditor

- Scientific Perspectives on Divine Action (1996, 1997, 1999, 2000, and 2002)
- Resurrection: Theological and Scientific Assessments (Eerdmans, 2002)
- Theology and Science (journal)
