= List of scholars on the relationship between religion and science =

This is a list of notable individuals who have focused on studying the intersection of religion and science.

== A ==
- S. Alexander
- Gordon W. Allport: noted Behavioural Psychologist & author of The Individual and his Religion (1951).
- Nathan Aviezer

== B ==
- Ian Barbour: author of Issues in Science and Religion (1966).
- E.W. Barnes
- Stephen M. Barr: author of The Believing Scientist: Essays on Science and Religion (2016). Description & arrow/scrollable preview.
- Arnold O. Benz: astrophysicist at ETH Zurich, author of The Future of the Universe (2002) and Astrophysics and Creation (2017)
- Mani Lal Bhaumik: author of Code Name God (2005).
- Nader El-Bizri: author of The Phenomenological Quest between Avicenna and Heidegger, general editor of the series Epistles of the Brethren of Purity (tenth century encyclopaedia of science, philosophy and religion), co-Editor of Islamic Philosophy and Occidental Phenomenology in Dialogue, and editor of the "Islam Division" of Encyclopaedia of Sciences and Religions.
- John Hedley Brooke: Andreas Idreos Professor of Science and Religion at the University of Oxford (1999–2006)
- Ralph Wendell Burhoe: an important twentieth century pioneer interpreter of the importance of religion for a scientific and technological world.
- E. A. Burtt: author of The Metaphysical Foundations of Modern Physical Science (1925).

== C ==
- Geoffrey Cantor: author of Quakers, Jews, and Science: Religious Responses to Modernity and the Sciences in Britain, 1650-1900 (2005).
- Fritjof Capra: author of The Tao of Physics (1975).
- Pierre Teilhard de Chardin: author of Science and Christ (1965, English Translation).
- Francis S. Collins: director of the Human Genome Project, author of The Language of God (2006).
- C. A. Coulson: author of Science and Christian Belief (1955).
- Alistair Cameron Crombie: author of Augustine to Galileo: The History of Science A.D. 400 - 1650.

== D ==
- Richard Dawkins: has written about the relationship between science and religion for a popular audience with books such as A Devil's Chaplain and The God Delusion. Dawkins has also engaged in public debates on the topic.
- Pierre Duhem: well known for his works on the philosophy and history of science, especially in the Middle Ages.

== E ==
- Arthur Eddington: author of The Nature of the Physical World (1928) and Why I Believe in God: Science and Religion, as a Scientist Sees It (1930).

== F ==
- John Freely: author of Aladdin's Lamp: How Greek Science Came to Europe Through the Islamic World and Before Galileo: The Birth of Modern Science in Medieval Europe.

== G ==
- Stephen Jay Gould: introduced the concept of non-overlapping magisteria, arguing that religion and science attempt to describe different domains of knowledge.
- Edward Grant: author of The Foundations of Modern Science in the Middle Ages (1996), God and Reason in the Middle Ages (2001), and Science and Religion, 400 B.C. to A.D. 1550: From Aristotle to Copernicus (2004)
- Nidhal Guessoum: author of Islam's Quantum Question: Reconciling Muslim Tradition and Modern Science (2010)

== H ==
- John Habgood: author of Religion and Science (1964).
- J.S. Haldane
- Charles Hartshorne: author of Philosophers Speak of God (1953).
- Waldemar Haffkine
- Peter Harrison: author of The Territories of Science and Religion (2015).
- John F. Haught: author of Science and Religion—From Conflict to Conversation (1995).
- Philip Hefner: author of The Human Factor: Evolution, Culture, and Religion (1993) and coined an influential phrase when he defined human beings as created co-creators. He was a longtime editor of Zygon: Journal of Religion and Science.
- John L. Heilbron: author of The Sun in the Church: Cathedrals as Solar Observatories (1999).
- Karl Heim: author involving in the religion and science dialogue, his thought on quantum mechanics has been seen as the precursor to much of the current studies on divine action.
- Michał Heller: author of Creative tension essays on science and religion: Essays on Science and Religion (2003).
- Mary B. Hesse: author of Science and The Human Imagination: Aspects of the History of Logic of Physical Science (1954).
- Martinez Hewlett: author of the chapter on "Molecular Biology and Religion" (pp. 172–186) in The Oxford Handbook of Religion and Science (2006)
- Reijer Hooykaas: author of Religion and the Rise of Modern Science (1972)
- Julian Huxley

== I ==
- W.R. Inge

== J ==
- L.P. Jacks
- Stanley Jaki: leading contributor to the philosophy of science and the history of science, and in particular their relationship to Christianity.
- Malcolm Jeeves: formerly President of the Royal Society of Edinburgh, founder of the St Andrews Psychology Department, and author of, most recently, with Warren S. Brown "Neuroscience, Psychology, and Religion: Illusions, Delusions, and Realities about Human Nature" (2009) and "From Cells to Souls-and Beyond" (2003)

== K ==
- Donald E. Knuth: author of Things a Computer Scientist Rarely Talks About (2001)

== L ==
- Denis Lamoureux: holds PhDs in both theology and biology and is also a retired dentist, has written several books on the relationship between science and religion, including the Bible & Ancient Science (McGahan Publishing House, 2020), has debated proponents of ID, atheistic evolution, and young earth creationism, including Stephen Meyer, Lawrence Krauss, and Kent Hovind), and is professor of science and religion at the University of Alberta.
- John Lennox: has written several books on the relationship between science and religion and has also debated Richard Dawkins on the topic.
- David C. Lindberg: co-editors of two anthologies on the relationship between religion and science.
- David N. Livingstone: author of Dealing with Darwin: Place, Politics, and Rhetoric in Religious Engagements with Evolution (2014).

== M ==
- B. Malinowski
- Henry Margenau: co-author of Cosmos, Bios, Theos Scientists Reflect on Science, God, and the Origins of the Universe, Life, and Homo sapiens (1992)
- Alister McGrath: Andreas Idreos Professor of Science and Religion at the University of Oxford (2014–)
- Robert K. Merton: sociologist proposing the Merton Thesis
- E. A. Milne: author of Modern Cosmology and the Christian Idea of God (1952).
- Nancey Murphy co-author with George Ellis of On the Moral Nature of the Universe: Theology, Cosmology, and Ethics

== N ==
- Seyyed Hossein Nasr: author of the chapter on Islam and science (pp. 71–86) in The Oxford Handbook of Religion and Science (2006)
- Ronald L. Numbers: co-editors of two anthologies on the relationship between religion and science.

== O ==
- Thomas Jay Oord: author of Defining Love (2010).

== P ==
- Kuruvilla Pandikattu: Author of six books on the relationship between Science and Religion, including Religion@scientist.com and Ever Approachable, Never Attainable: Science-Religion Dialogue in India.
- Arthur Peacocke: author of Creation and the World of Science (1979).
- Robert T. Pennock: author of Tower of Babel a strong defense of Darwinian evolution and the chapter on "The Pre-modern Sins of Intelligent Design" (pp. 732–748) in The Oxford Handbook of Religion and Science (2006)
- John Polkinghorne: author of Science and Theology (1998) and Faith, Science and Understanding (2000).
- William G. Pollard: author of a significant amount of material in the areas of science and religion such as Physicist and Christian: A dialogue between the communities (1961)
- William B. Provine: author of the chapter on "Evolution, Religion, and Science" (pp. 652–666) in The Oxford Handbook of Religion and Science (2006)
- Mihajlo Pupin

== R ==
- Ian Ramsey: author of Religious Language (1957).
- Fazale Rana: CEO of Reasons to Believe
- Hugh Ross (creationist): founder of Reasons to Believe
- Bertrand Russell

== S ==
- Norbert M. Samuelson: author of the chapter on Judaism and Science (pp. 41–56) in The Oxford Handbook of Religion and Science (2006)
- Nicholas Saunders: author of Divine Action and Modern Science (2002).
- Harold K. Schilling: author of Science and Religion (1962).
- H. R. L. Sheppard

== T ==
- J. Arthur Thomson
- Paul Tillich
- Thomas F. Torrance: author of Space, Time and Incarnation, Space Time and Resurrection, and Theological Science literary executor for the philosopher and scientist Michael Polanyi, and winner of 1978 Templeton Prize.
- Jonathan R. Topham: author of Reading the Book of Nature: How Eight Best Sellers Reconnected Christianity and the Sciences on the Eve of the Victorian Age (2022).
- Renny Thomas: author of Science and Religion in India: Beyond Disenchantment (London: Routledge, 2022)

== U ==
- James Ungureanu: author of Science, Religion, and the Protestant Tradition – Retracing the Origins of Conflict (2019).

== W ==
- Charles D. Walcott
- B. Alan Wallace: author of the chapter on Buddhism and Science (pp. 24–40) in The Oxford Handbook of Religion and Science (2006)
- David Wilkinson: author of Science, religion, and the search for extraterrestrial intelligence (2013).

== See also ==
- Interfaith dialogue
- Relationship between religion and science
- List of Christians in science and technology
- List of participants in the dialogue of religion and science
