= Physicist and Christian =

Book by William G. Pollard

- Author: William G. Pollard
- Language: English
- Subject: Religion and science
- Publisher: Seabury Press
- Publication date: 1961
- Publication place: United States
- Media type: Print (hardcover)
- Pages: 178

Physicist and Christian: A Dialogue Between the Communities (1961) is a book by William G. Pollard. Much of the attention given to the book such as its review in Time magazine has been attributed to the fact that Pollard was not only a physicist but also an Anglican priest. The book deliberately avoids specific subject matter differences, focusing on religion and science both as human communities. An important theme is the idea that human knowledge—scientific or religious—can be developed only by those, like Pollard, who have "fully and freely" given themselves to a human community, whether to the physics community or Christian community or some other, e.g., the United States Marine Corps. Also an important theme is Pollard's argument and cautions against a cultural norm in which scientific knowledge would be objective and public, on the one hand, while religious knowledge would be subjective and private, on the other.

== Contents ==
There are six chapters plus a preface and author's note. The first chapter Community vs. Subject Matter discusses the benefits of focusing on science and religion as communities, outlining five common frameworks in which religion and science are routinely compared. The first chapter's section on "Impersonal vs. Personal knowledge" highlights Werner Heisenberg's May 1958 article in Harper's Magazine and Michael Polanyi's 1958 book Personal Knowledge. The second chapter Science and Christianity as Communities begins by mentioning the work of the well-respected sociologist George Homans and anthropologist Robert Redfield selecting six methods from Redfield's The Little Community (University of Chicago Press, 1956) with which to study and compare the religion and science communities. In the third chapter The Reality of Spirit, Pollard uses the United States Marine Corps as an example of another community in order to compare it with the religion and science communities and to better explain ancient and modern ideas of spirit. The third chapter's section on "Spirit and Holy Spirit" states that Eric Hoffer's The True Believer "offers a profound understanding and exceptionally clear insights into the nature of the spirit in the community...", but takes exception to Hoffer's idea that any spirit from a mass movement and its community, Christian or otherwise, always ends up being bad. The fourth chapter Nature and Supernature introduces Rudolf Otto's The Idea of the Holy leading into a discussion about non-conceptual components within the experience of life and how that relates to the science community. The fourth chapter holds that a range of reality can be experienced that is non-conceptual and to illustrate how a portion of reality could appear so, it goes over the idea of higher dimensions using Edwin Abbott's Flatland as an example. Chapter five Knowledge discusses epistemology as found in both science and religion communities incorporating ideas from Martin Buber's book I and Thou and a diagram from Henry Margenau. The sixth chapter The Problem of Revelation jocularly states "To one who has known the sense of real achievement which accompanies the gaining of each new understanding and insight in science, the idea of revealed knowledge is likely to seem on a par with copying answers out of an answer book at an examination."

== Critical stands ==
- On pages 9–11, Pollard makes his first argument of five about certain common science-and-religion contrasts, which he holds to be irrelevant once seen in the light of science as a community. Here, the "common assertion that anyone can demonstrate the truths of science for himself, but the tenets of religion have to be accepted blindly on faith" is claimed as false.
- On page 61, Pollard discusses Edward R. Murrow's This I Believe. Pollard comments that these professions of private belief by prominent figures are inadequate and "disturbing evidence of the religious bankruptcy of our time."

== Influences ==
One of this book's major influences was the then Pennsylvania State University Dean of Physics Harold K. Schilling, whose lecture Pollard credits as follows. "The effect of it was to let me realize for the first time that the same emphasis on community which was quite natural and generally understood in the acquisition of Christian knowledge within the Church could be applied in a remarkably parallel fashion to my earlier experience of coming to know physics through my personal involvement in and commitment to the community of physicists."

Without doubt the term science community, heard with increasing frequency, is extremely useful in describing science as it actually is. Certainly it does exist and it is a community with the usual attributes of human communities. It has its own ideals and characteristic way of life; its own standards, mores, conventions, signs and symbols, language and jargon, professional ethics, sanctions and controls, authority, institutions and organizations, publications; its own creeds and beliefs, orthodoxies and heresies and effective ways of dealing with the latter. This community is affected, as are other communities, by the usual vagaries, adequacies, and shortcomings of human beings. It has its politics, its pulling and hauling, its pressure groups; its differing schools of thought, its divisions and schisms; its personal loyalties and animosities, jealousies, hatreds, and rallying cries; its fads and fashions.

— Harold K. Schilling, "A Human Enterprise: Science as lived by its practitioners bears but little resemblance to science as described in print." Science, June 6, 1958, 127(3310), pages 1324-1327.

Pollard's extensive use of the analogy between the Holy Spirit within the Church and the esprit de corps of United States Marine Corps owes a direct debt to the Reverend Canon Theodore O. Wedel.

== Reviews ==
- The Christian Century, "Out of Oakridge", John D. Godsey, volume 79 (February 28, 1962)

Physicist and [Christian] is a good antidote to an impersonal, mechanistic understanding of science or to an individualistic view of Christianity. Its greatest weakness is its failure to do justice to the problem of sin in the empirical community. As a result the distinction between the spirit of the Christian community and the Holy Spirit becomes blurred. Here Pollard's "Catholic Christianity" needs to be corrected by a Protestant understanding of the Word of God in the community.

- Library Journal, volume 86, (Sept. 1 1961)
- The New York Times Book Review, "In the Field of Religion", Nash K. Burger, (Dec. 31 1961)

Two subjects of continuing religious and intellectual interest--the relation of science and religion and the matter of education--are given first-rate treatment in recent books by authors speaking with authority. William G. Pollard in [Physicist and Christian] writes as both atomic scientist and Episcopal clergyman, defining the spheres of physics and religion and showing how the claims and achievements of each, when properly understood, are complementary rather than contradictory.

- Time magazine, volume 78, (Oct. 13 1961)

"The New Heaven" Friday, Oct. 13, 1961

- Journal of the American Scientific Affiliation, PSCF Book Reviews for March 1965

Review

== Citations ==
- Religion and Science, John Habgood, Mills & Brown, 1964, pp. 130–131

"Learning to be a scientist, being initiated into the scientific community, discovering how to handle scientific concepts, deciding how much weight to give to this or that consideration, or what nuance of interpretation is demanded here or there, has been compared with learning to be a Christian. W.G. Pollard, who is a leading American physicist as well as an Anglican clergyman, has recently written a fascinating book making the comparison in detail."

- The Colossal Book of Mathematics: Classic Puzzles, Paradoxes, and Problems : Number Theory, Algebra, Geometry, Probability, Topology, Game Theory, Infinity, and Other Topics of Recreational Mathematics, Martin Gardner, W. W. Norton & Company, 2001, ISBN 0-393-02023-1, p. 154

"Yes," I said. "I recently read an interesting book called Physicist and Christian, William G. Pollard (executive director of the Oak Ridge Institute of Nuclear Studies and an Episcopal clergyman). He draws heavily on Heim's concept of hyperspace."
