= Leshan (disambiguation) =

Leshan is a prefecture-level city in China.

Leshan or LeShan may also refer to:

== Places in Kosovo ==
- Leshan, Peja, a settlement
- Leshan, Suva Reka, a settlement

== People ==
- Leshan Lewis, better known as L.E.S. (music producer) (born 1966), American DJ and producer
- Eda LeShan (1922–2002), American writer, television host, counselor, educator and playwright
- Lawrence LeShan (1920–2020), American psychologist, educator
