= Edmund Fuller =

American historian

Edmund Maybank Fuller (3 March 1914 – 29 January 2001) was an American educator, editor, novelist, historian, and literary critic.

== Career ==
Fuller directed plays at Longwood Gardens, taught playwriting at the New School for Social Research, and wrote a history of drama for students at the secondary-school level. His biography of Milton (1944) is enlivened by novelistic techniques which he justified, in an "Author's Note", by appealing to the example of other biographers from Plutarch on down. This led in 1946 to the most important of his novels, A Star Pointed North, a historical novel based on the life of Frederick Douglass which includes as characters William Lloyd Garrison, John Brown, Harriet Tubman, Abraham Lincoln, and his successor as president, Andrew Johnson. Other novels followed: Brothers Divided (1951), The Corridor (1963), and Flight (1970). In the Douglass novel Fuller is said to have "bridged an aching gap in American history." As a historian and biographer he was attracted to off-the-beaten-track topics. In Journey into the Self (1950) he wove together the surviving papers of Gertrude Stein's brother, Leo Stein, in a biographical narrative, and two years later the Vermont State Board of Education published his Vermont: A History of the Green Mountain State. Tinkers and Genius: The Story of the Yankee Inventors followed in 1955; God in the White House: The Faiths of American Presidents, co-authored with David E. Green, in 1968; and Prudence Crandall: An Incident of Racism in Nineteenth-Century Connecticut in 1971.

Early in his career Fuller served for eight years as editor-in-chief at Crown Publishers, where he compiled an anthology of the law in literature and large collections of quotations, anecdotes, epigrams, and, in collaboration with Hiram Haydn, book digests. In 1948 he left the metropolis for 264 acres near Shoreham, Vermont, where he hoped to sustain his family through farming combined with free-lance consulting with authors and publishers. That effort lasted only five years, during nt together another Crown anthology, Mutiny! drawing on historical accounts ranging in date from Livy to Chiang Kai-shek and including his own brief piece, "Nat Turner the Prophet."

In 1953 he accepted a faculty appointment at the Kent School in Connecticut, where he would teach English and theology until he left to join Dr. John O. Patterson, the former Headmaster of Kent who had founded St. Stephen's School in Rome, Italy in 1964. While at Kent he co-edited (with Oak Ridge physicist William G. Pollard) in two volumes the proceedings of ecumenical symposia held at Kent in 1955 (for the school's fiftieth anniversary) and 1960 on "the Christian idea of education." An ongoing association with Pollard equipped him to review the book Science Ponders Religion (1960) Harlow Shapley ed., an account of eight summers of the Star Island Institute on Religion in an Age of Science Conferences, Fuller comments on Henry Margenau, Ian G. Barbour, Theodosius Dobzhansky, Kirtley F. Mather, Edwin C. Kemble, Ralph W. Burhoe, and others, but says that in order to provide a better balance of viewpoints another volume is needed containing work by such thinkers as Pollard, Charles A. Coulson, or Charles E. Raven. "From the physical sciences to psychiatry," he writes, "a new rapprochement is developing between science and religion" that some of the authors in the volume under review "fail to understand."

From 1955 through 1968 he made selections from, or abridged reading versions of, long classics that were staples in the curriculum: novels by Tolstoy, Dostoevsky, Ross Lockridge, Dickens, Romain Rolland, and Thackeray in addition to Johnson's Lives of the Poets, Bulfinch's Mythology, and works by Plutarch, Boswell, and Vasari—thirteen volumes in all. Meanwhile, over the same period, slightly extended, he served as general editor for Harcourt, Brace & World's "Adventures in Good Books" textbook series, editing six of the fifteen volumes himself; edited two essay anthologies for other publishers; edited Laurel paperbacks of selected works by Voltaire, Balzac, and Mark Twain, as well as seven annotated plays by Shakespeare; and edited two or three other textbooks, including a selection from the poetry of Longfellow.

Fuller returned to Connecticut in 1966 and became chairman of the English department at South Kent School from 1971 to 1978. The bulk of Fuller's work as a critic consists of book reviews in the Saturday Review and major New York newspapers. He was book review editor of The Wall Street Journal for 32 years. In 1969 and 1973 he served on the selection jury for the Pulitzer Prize for Fiction. He also published several critical essays and two more books of literary criticism, companion surveys of the contemporary literary scene springing from his deep familiarity as a reviewer. The first focuses on aspects of mid-century taste that he found deplorable; the second calls for greater appreciation of selected writers whose work, though then unfashionable, represents what to Fuller are enduring values. Man in Modern Fiction (1958) is aptly subtitled "some minority opinions on contemporary American writing." As an adherent of traditional Christian humanism Fuller decried the emphasis on human depravity, the denial of freedom and moral responsibility, and the embrace of meaninglessness that he found characteristic of such novelists as Nelson Algren, James Jones, Norman Mailer, and Jack Kerouac, representing what he later would call "the post-Chatterley deluge." The eight National Book Award choices to date reflected, he believed, this prevailing taste. But he saw encouraging signs of a counter-trend, an emergence of good writers "in the great tradition of man as a rational, free, responsible, purposeful—even though fallible and imperfect—creature of God," and in Books with Men behind Them (1962) (whose title derives from a mot of Emerson's) he named more than a dozen such writers and singled out seven for extensive analysis: Thornton Wilder, Gladys Schmitt, Alan Paton, C. P. Snow, C. S. Lewis, J. R. R. Tolkien, and Charles Williams. On two of the Inklings Fuller would have more to say a few years later.

He issued a selection of John Donne's sermons, edited and abridged, believing that "much in Donne's thought and expression speaks with extraordinary directness and aptness to our own condition today." Affirmations of God and Man: Writings for Modern Dialogue grew out of many conversations about religion that Fuller had with students at his own school and on the university lecture circuit. It consists of nearly 250 extracts from a wide array of authors, ancient to contemporary and quite varied in religious orientation, arranged thematically to spark discussion on issues central to theological inquiry. Finally, after retiring and moving to Chapel Hill, N. C., where his friend from The Wall Street Journal days, Vermont C. Royster, was teaching journalism, Fuller assembled about a hundred of Royster's prize-winning columns that he thought deserved continued attention beyond what newspapers generally afford.
