= Katharine Way =

American physicist (1902–1995)

- Born: February 20, 1902; Sewickley, Pennsylvania
- Died: December 9, 1995 (aged 93); Chapel Hill, North Carolina
- Citizenship: United States of America
- Education: Columbia University; University of North Carolina at Chapel Hill
- Known for: Nuclear Data Project; Way–Wigner formula
- Scientific career
- Fields: Physics
- Workplaces: University of Tennessee; Manhattan Project; National Bureau of Standards; Oak Ridge National Laboratory; Duke University
- Thesis: Photoelectric Cross Section of the Deuteron (1938)
- Doctoral advisor: John Wheeler

Katharine "Kay" Way (February 20, 1902 – December 9, 1995) was an American physicist best known for her work on the Nuclear Data Project. During World War II, she worked for the Manhattan Project at the Metallurgical Laboratory in Chicago. She became an adjunct professor at Duke University in 1968.

== Early life and education ==
Katharine Way was born in Sewickley, Pennsylvania, the second child of William Addisson Way, a lawyer, and his wife Louise Jones. She had an older brother and a younger sister. Originally named Catherine, she later changed the spelling to Katharine. Friends and colleagues generally knew her as Kay. Her mother died when she was twelve years old, and her father married an ear and throat specialist, who provided Kay with a role model of a career woman.

Way was educated at Miss Hartridge's boarding school in Plainfield, New Jersey, and Rosemary Hall in Greenwich, Connecticut. In 1920 she entered Vassar College, but was forced to drop out after two years after becoming ill with suspected tuberculosis. After convalescing in Saranac Lake, New York, she attended Barnard College for two semesters in 1924 and 1925.

From 1929 to 1934 she studied physics at Columbia University, where Edward Kasner stoked an interest in mathematics, and co-authored Way's first published academic paper. She graduated with her BS in 1932. She next went to the University of North Carolina to study nuclear theory, where John Wheeler stimulated an interest in nuclear physics, and she became his first PhD student. Because jobs were hard to come by during the Great Depression, she stayed on as a graduate student after completing the requirements of her PhD.

In 1938, she became a Huff Research Fellow at Bryn Mawr College, which allowed her to receive her PhD for her thesis on nuclear physics, "Photoelectric Cross Section of the Deuteron". She subsequently took up a teaching position at the University of Tennessee in 1939, becoming an assistant professor in 1941.

At a conference in New York in 1938, Way presented a paper, "Nuclear Quadrupole and Magnetic Moments," in which she examined deformation of a spinning atomic nucleus under three models, including Niels Bohr's liquid drop model. She followed this up with a closer examination of the liquid drop model in a paper entitled "The Liquid-Drop Model and Nuclear Moments," in which she showed that the resulting cigar-shaped nucleus could be unstable. Wheeler later recalled that:

One day [Katherine Way] came in and reported a difficulty. The equations gave no solution in the case of a sufficiently highly charged nucleus turning at a sufficiently great angular velocity. It was clear that one had to do in this case with a kind of instability. It took only 1939 and the discovery of [Otto] Hahn and [Fritz] Strassmann to recognize the nature of the instability: nuclear fission. Why did we not go to the analysis of the higher order terms in the deformation energy and predict fission in advance of its discovery? It was not any difficulty in mathematics. It was a difficulty in the model. It failed to give the right magnitudes and the right trends for nuclear magnetic moments.

== Manhattan Project ==
In 1942, Wheeler recruited Way to work on the Manhattan Project at the Metallurgical Laboratory in Chicago. Working with physicist Alvin Weinberg, Way analyzed neutron flux data from Enrico Fermi's early nuclear reactor designs to see whether it would be possible to create a self-sustaining nuclear chain reaction. These calculations were put to use in the construction of Chicago Pile-1. Afterwards, she examined the problem of nuclear poisoning of reactors by certain fission products. With physicist Eugene Wigner she developed the Way–Wigner formula for decay heat.

Way also visited the Hanford Site and the Los Alamos Laboratory. In mid-1945 she moved to Oak Ridge, Tennessee, where she continued her research into nuclear decay. While there, she began to specialize in the collection and organization of nuclear data.

Despite contributing to the Manhattan Project, she questioned the morality of using the atomic bomb. She signed the Szilárd petition of 1945 and later co-edited the 1946 New York Times bestseller One World or None: a Report to the Public on the Full Meaning of the Atomic Bomb with Dexter Masters. The book included essays by Niels Bohr, Albert Einstein and Robert Oppenheimer, and sold over 100,000 copies. She also joined the Federation of Atomic Scientists, a group which was very concerned about the use of nuclear weapons for mass destruction and later became the Federation of American Scientists. Furthermore, her suggestions led William G. Pollard to establish of the Oak Ridge Institute of Nuclear Studies (now known as Oak Ridge Institute for Science and Education) in 1946 to develop peaceful applications for the nuclear science which came out of the Manhattan Project.

== Later life ==
Way moved to Washington, D.C., in 1949, where she went to work for the National Bureau of Standards. Four years later, she persuaded the National Academy of Sciences' National Research Council to establish the Nuclear Data Project (NDP), an organization with special responsibility for gathering and disseminating nuclear data, under her leadership. The NDP moved to the Oak Ridge National Laboratory in 1964, but Way remained its head until 1968. Beginning in 1964, the NDP published a journal, Nuclear Data Sheets, to disseminate the information that the NDP had gathered. This was joined the following year by a second journal, Atomic Data and Nuclear Data Tables. She also persuaded the editors of Nuclear Physics to add keywords to the subject headings of articles to facilitate cross-referencing.

Way left the NDP in 1968 to join the Triangle Universities Nuclear Laboratory, becoming an adjunct professor at Duke University in Durham, North Carolina. Meanwhile, she continued as editor of Nuclear Data Sheets until 1973, and Atomic Data and Nuclear Data Tables until 1982. In later life she became interested in the health problems of seniors, and lobbied for improved health care for them.

Way died at Chapel Hill, North Carolina, on December 9, 1995.
