= Fazale Rana =

American biochemist and author (born 1963)

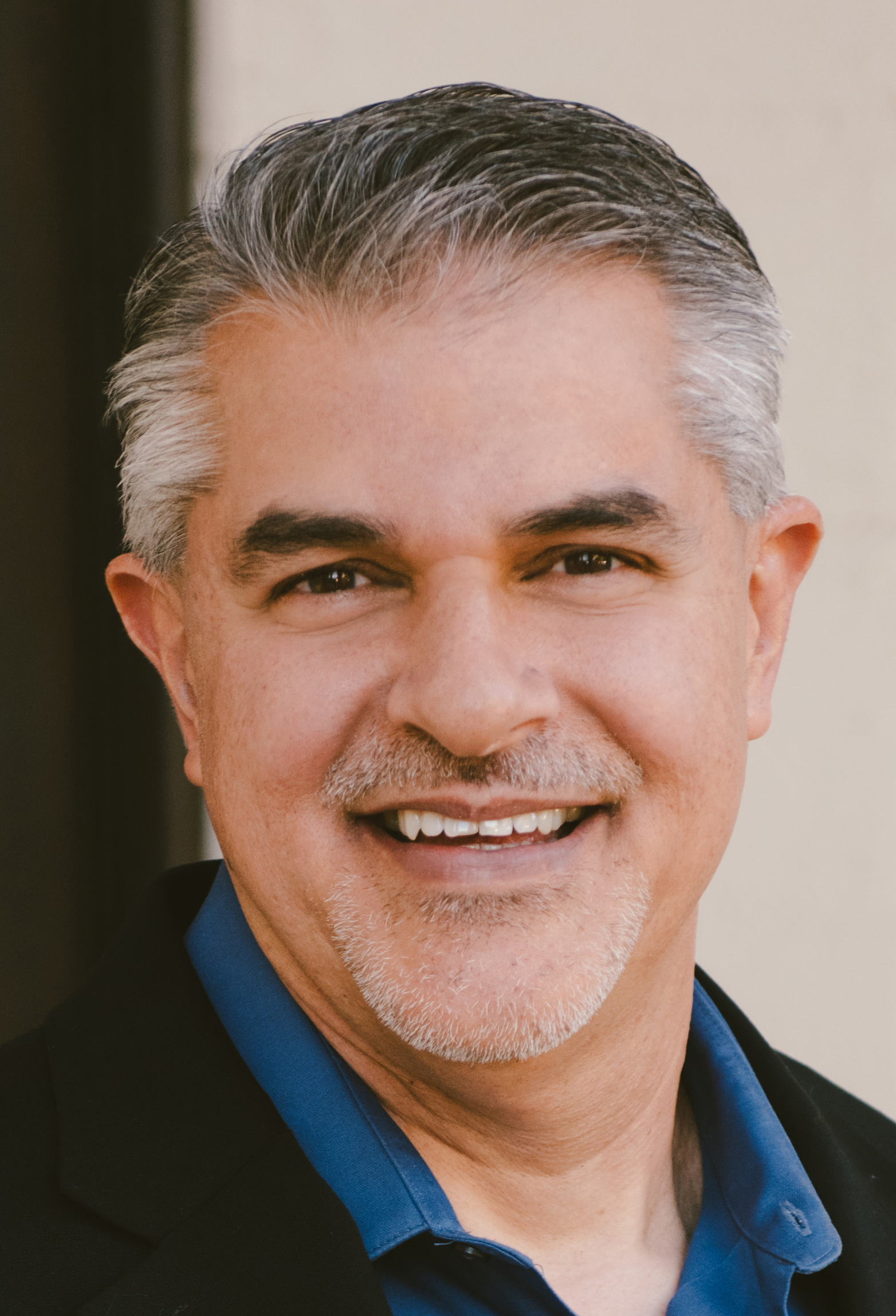
- Born: February 6, 1963 (age 63); Ames, Iowa
- Education: West Virginia State College (BS) chemistry; Ohio University (PhD) chemistry
- Occupations: Biochemist; Christian apologist; author; science lecturer; CEO of Reasons to Believe
- Predecessor: Hugh Ross
- Awards: West Virginia State College Presidential Scholar, 1981–1985; Donald Clippinger Research Award (1988); Donald Clippinger Research Award (1990)

Fazale "Fuz" Rana (born February 6, 1963) is an American biochemist, Christian apologist, author, and science lecturer. Since July 2022, he has advanced from the position of vice president to become the president and CEO of Reasons to Believe, a nonprofit organization that promotes day-age forms of old Earth creationism. He writes and speaks extensively about evidence for creation emerging from biochemistry, genetics, human origins, and synthetic biology.

== Early life ==
He was born in Ames, Iowa, and raised in West Virginia. He was the older of two sons. Rana's father was a Punjabi immigrant, a physics professor, department chair, and a devout Muslim. His mother was a non-practicing Catholic. Although his father encouraged his sons to adopt a Muslim identity, Rana was not religious growing up.

In high school, Rana was a straight-A student, but had a reputation for being a prankster. As a teenager, his interests were described as "sports, girls, and rock and roll." As a sophomore in high school, Rana learned Islamic prayers and read the Koran, but he later abandoned the effort after finding it too burdensome. He toyed with universalism in graduate school but gave up that view when he converted to Christianity.

Initially, Rana considered himself an agnostic. The cell's complexity, coupled with his skepticism toward evolutionary scenarios to account for life's origin, caused him to conclude that life must stem from a Creator.

When they met in college, Rana's fiancée Amy was a nominal Christian who had drifted away from her childhood faith. They both were studying chemistry and biology together and made plans to marry the summer after Amy graduated. Just before graduation, Amy rededicated her life to Jesus Christ at a local nondenominational church. Upon meeting Rana, Amy's pastor challenged him to read the Bible. He purchased the cheapest edition of a King James Bible he could find and started reading it in the lab. He had a religious experience after reading the Sermon on the Mount and dedicated his life to Christ shortly afterwards. His parents disapproved of his conversion, with his father threatening to disown him.

Rana was inspired to pursue evangelism after he was unable to explain his faith to his father before his death. After his loss, evangelistic conversations with his colleagues became more important to him than his work. He prayed to God, asking that he would be used as a scientist for evangelism because he wanted to reach others.

== Education ==
Rana attended West Virginia State College (Now University) where he earned a BS degree in chemistry. He then began his graduate work at Ohio University where he received his PhD in chemistry, with an emphasis in biochemistry, in 1990. He completed his postdoctoral studies in the biophysics of cell membranes at both the University of Virginia and the University of Georgia.

== Career ==
Rana began his career by teaching at various academic institutions. Before pursuing apologetics full-time, Rana worked as an R&D scientist at companies such as Procter & Gamble. His wife Amy was teaching biology at a local community college and brought home a variety of creationist literature when the term ended. Rana was curious and flipped through several books, finding them to be "horrible science." In his opinion, the Christian authors did not appear to understand certain subjects, such as the chemistry of radiometric dating. As Rana located more books on evolution, he came across Hugh Ross’ Creator and the Cosmos. This is the first time he read about Ross’ Progressive Creation Theory and he decided to investigate Ross’ organization, Reasons to Believe.

He signed up for a 34-week training course at the organization and went on to start a Bible study focused on science and faith at his workplace at Procter & Gamble. He later learned that Reasons to Believe was considering adding another scientist to their staff, so he wrote to them and offered his services.

Rana joined Reasons to Believe in 1999. He was eventually appointed Vice President of Science Apologetics. He was later promoted to the Vice President of Research and Apologetics where he began to oversee his fellow staff scholars. Aside from writing multiple books, he has spoken at universities, churches, and conferences worldwide.

In 2011, he stated to NPR "From my viewpoint, a historical Adam and Eve is absolutely central to the truth claims of the Christian faith" and he has questioned the evolution theory.

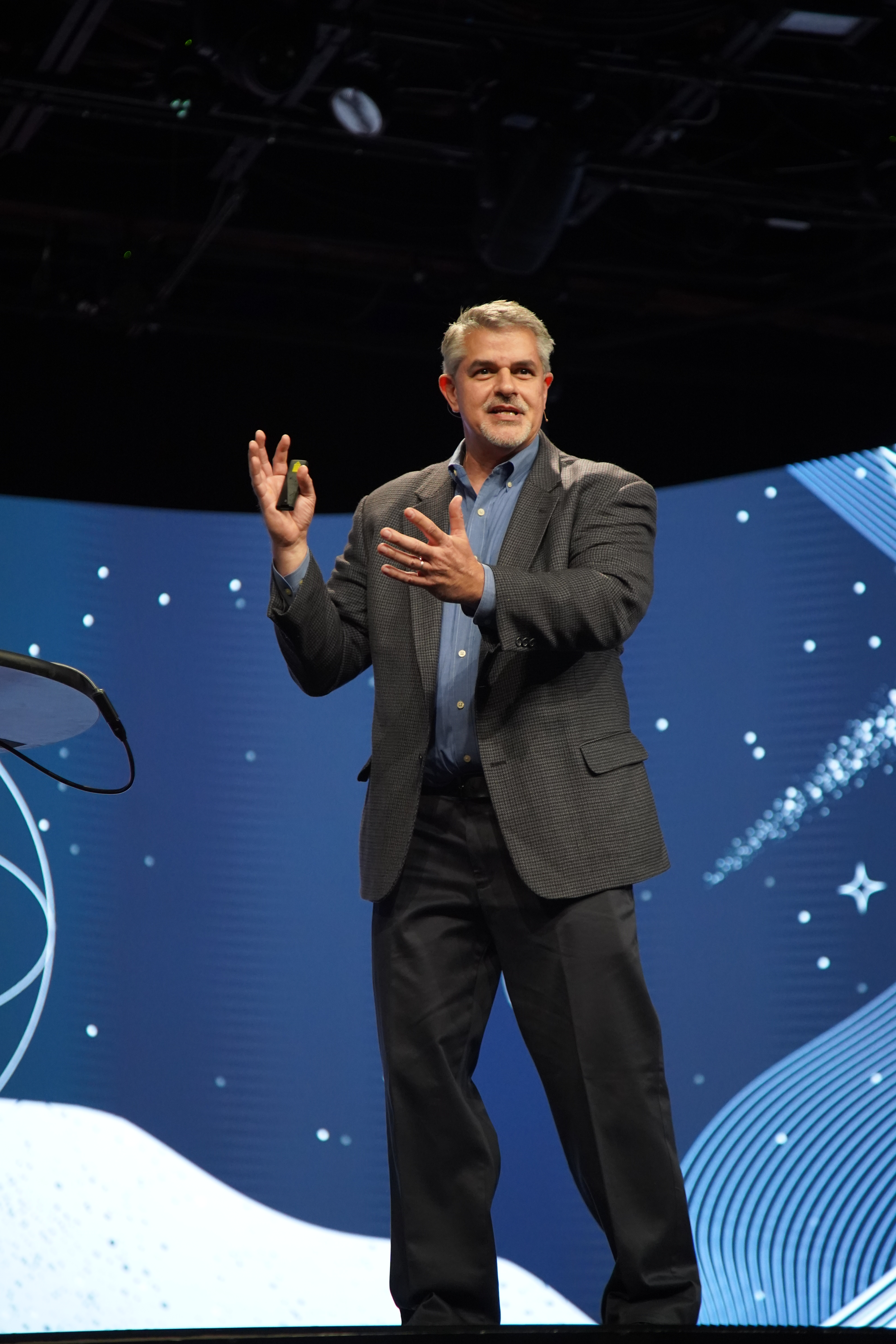
Dr. Fazale Rana presents at Grace Church St. Louis in November 2022

Rana has been interviewed in media outlets such as Fox News, The Christian Broadcasting Network, In the Market with Janet Parshall, and The John Ankerberg Show. He has also written as a contributor for publications such as World Magazine and Salvo Magazine.

== Views ==
=== Adam and Eve ===
Rana believes that a literal, historical Adam and Eve is central to the truth claims of the Christian faith for many reasons. One is that the Genesis account makes man unique, created in the image of God – not a descendant of lower primates. Second, it tells a story of how evil came into the world, and it's not a story in which God introduced evil through the process of evolution, but one in which Adam and Eve decided to disobey God and eat the forbidden fruit.

=== Criticism of William Lane Craig ===
Rana has been openly critical of Dr. William Lane Craig’s book In Quest of the Historical Adam: A Biblical and Scientific Exploration, published in 2021. Rana penned a review of the manuscript for The Christian Research Institute. In this, he states, "Craig’s theological and scientific conclusions are unlikely to be accepted by many evangelicals and theologically conservative Christians.…I direct most of my focus on the scientific issues — in particular, how symbolic artifacts in the fossil record provide compelling evidence that Adam (and Eve) are best understood as modern humans, who alone display cognitive capacities that reflect the image of God."

== Personal life ==
Rana (also known as Fuz) loves blues, southern and country rock music, including artists such as Lynyrd Skynyrd and Marshall Tucker. He supports the Cincinnati Reds and Cincinnati Bengals and enjoys playing fantasy sports and reading Shakespeare – especially the tragedies.

== Selected journal articles ==
Rana has published more than 30 articles in peer-reviewed scientific journals, including Biochemistry, Applied Spectroscopy, FEBS Letters, Journal of Microbiological Methods, Journal of Chemical Education and Origins of Life and Evolution of Biospheres.

- Thomas, J. A., & Rana, F. R. (2007). The influence of environmental conditions, lipid composition, and phase behavior on the origin of cell membranes. Origins of Life and Evolution of Biospheres, 37, 267–285.
- Rana, F. R., Macias, E. A., Sultany, C. M., Modzrakowski, M. C., & Blazyk, J. (1991). Interactions between magainin 2 and Salmonella typhimurium outer membranes: effect of lipopolysaccharide structure. Biochemistry, 30(24), 5858–5866.
- Perkins, M. A., Osborne, R., Rana, F. R., Ghassemi, A., & Robinson, M. K. (1999). Comparison of in vitro and in vivo human skin responses to consumer products and ingredients with a range of irritancy potential. Toxicological sciences: an official journal of the Society of Toxicology, 48(2), 218–229.
- Rana, F. R., & Blazyk, J. (1991). Interactions between the antimicrobial peptide, magainin 2, and Salmonella typhimurium lipopolysaccharides. FEBS letters, 293(1–2), 11–15.
- Rana, F. R., Mautone, A. J., & Dluhy, R. A. (1993). Surface chemistry of binary mixtures of phospholipids in monolayers. Infrared studies of surface composition at varying surface pressures in a pulmonary surfactant model system. Biochemistry, 32(12), 3169–3177.

== Bibliography ==
- The Cell's Design (Baker Books, 2008, ISBN 978-0801068270)
- What Darwin Didn't Know (RTB Press, 2009, ISBN 978-1886653481)
- Creating Life in the Lab (Baker Books, 2011, ISBN 978-0801072093)
- Origins of Life (RTB Press, 2014, ISBN 978-1886653153)
- Who Was Adam? (RTB Press, 2015, ISBN 978-1886653115)
- Dinosaur Blood and the Age of the Earth (RTB Press, 2016, ISBN 978-1886653184)
- Building Bridges (RTB Press, 2018, ISBN 978-1886653085)
- Humans 2.0 (RTB Press, 2019, ISBN 978-1886653122)
- Thinking about Evolution (RTB Press, 2020, ISBN 978-1886653979 )
- Fit for a Purpose (RTB Press, 2022, ISBN 978-1956112009)

== Filmography ==
Title	Type	Year	Role
Dual Revelation	Documentary film	2008	Self
Impartial	Documentary film	2018	Self
Breath of Life	Documentary series	2022	Self
Universe Designed	Documentary film	TBA	Self
