= Scientific Perspectives on Divine Action =

Scientific Perspectives on Divine Action is a five volume set that represents more than a decade of scientific-theological conferences sponsored by the Vatican Observatory and the Center for Theology and the Natural Sciences.

== Volumes ==
- Neuroscience and the Person: Scientific Perspectives on Divine Action
- Chaos and Complexity: Scientific Perspectives on Divine Action
- Quantum Cosmology and the Laws of Nature: Scientific Perspectives on Divine Action
- Evolutionary and Molecular Biology: Scientific Perspectives on Divine Action
- Quantum Mechanics: Scientific Perspectives on Divine Action, Robert John Russell (Corporate Author), Philip Clayton (Corporate Author), Kirk Wegter-McNelly (Ed), John Polkinghorne (Ed)

== See also ==
- Divine Action and Modern Science
- Natural theology
- Theophysics
