= RTB =

RTB may refer to:

== Businesses and organizations ==
- Reasons to Believe, a creationist group
- Residential Tenancies Board of Ireland; see State Agencies of the Republic of Ireland
- Richard Thomas and Baldwins, a former British steelmaker

=== Broadcasters ===
- RTBF, Belgium
- Radio Television of Belgrade, Yugoslavia
- Radio Television Brunei
- Radio Télévision du Burkina, Burkina Faso

== Other uses ==
- Juan Manuel Gálvez International Airport (IATA airport code), Roatán, Honduras
- Real-time bidding, in online advertising
- Right to Buy, a policy of the United Kingdom government allowing some tenants to purchase their home
- Rouge the Bat, a character from the Sonic the Hedgehog franchise
