= Trotter Prize (Texas A&M) =

The Trotter Prize (named after Dr. Ide P. Trotter Sr., former dean of the Texas A&M Graduate School) is awarded at Texas A&M University and is part of an endowed lecture series. It is awarded "for pioneering contributions to the understanding of the role of information, complexity and inference in illuminating the mechanisms and wonder of nature" and includes The Trotter Lecture which "seeks to reveal connections between science and religion, often viewed in academia as non-overlapping, if not rival, worldviews.

== Previous winners ==
Nobel Prize winners Charles Hard Townes and Francis Crick received the inaugural award at A&M's Rudder Theater in 2002. Townes spoke about connections between science and faith. Promoter of the notion of intelligent design William A. Dembski shared the award in 2005 with theoretical biologist Stuart Kauffman. Simon Conway Morris received the award and spoke in 2007. Francis Collins, the director of the Human Genome Project, and Steven Weinberg, a Nobel Prize recipient for physics, shared the Trotter Prize in 2008 and discussed the interplay between science and religion. Astronomer and historian of science Owen Gingerich also won the prize.

Robert L. Park has criticized the award for being given to William A. Dembski, a proponent of the pseudoscientific concept of intelligent design, saying it is given out for "overlapping the magisteria" (a comment based on Stephen Jay Gould's concept of non-overlapping magisteria, NOMA, the idea that science and religion inherently do not overlap).

== Honorees/ speakers ==
- 2025 Richard Dawkins, evolutionary biologist and zoologist; Rosalind Picard, Grover M. Hermann Professor in Health Sciences and Technology, Massachusetts Institute of Technology Media Lab
- 2024 Sean M. Carroll, professor, Johns Hopkins University; Michael Strauss, professor, The University of Oklahoma
- 2023 Jennifer Wiseman, astrophysicist; Marlan Scully, professor of physics, Texas A&M University
- 2022 Denis Alexander, Founding Director Emeritus, Faraday Institute for Science & Religion, Cambridge University; K. R. Sreenivasan, University Professor and Eugene Kleiner Professor for Innovation in Mechanical Engineering, New York University.
- 2020 Alan Lightman, writer and Professor of Practice of the Humanities, Massachusetts Institute of Technology; Andrew Steane, Professor of Physics, University of Oxford.
- 2019 Walter Bradley, polymer scientist, Texas A&M University; Stephen Freeland, evolutionary biologist, University of Maryland Baltimore County.
- 2018 Michael Duff spoke on "The Best of All Possible Worlds"; Donald Knuth spoke on "Translating the Bible into Music".
- 2015 John Lennox, Philosopher of Science and Christian apologist gave a lecture entitled "God, Science and the Nature of Explanation". Timothy Spector, Professor of Genetic Epidemiology/Head at King's College London spoke on "What Twins Reveal About the Science of Faith".
- 2014 Biologist James A. Shapiro spoke on "The Read-Write (RW) Genome: Taking Some of the Mystery Out of Evolution". James M. Tour from Rice University gave a talk on "The Impact of Faith Upon the Life of a Scientist".
- 2013 Roald Hoffmann, theoretical chemist who won the 1981 Nobel Prize in Chemistry gave a lecture: "INDIGO: A Story of Craft, Religion, History, Science, and Culture". Physicist Gerald Gabrielse spoke on "God of Antimatter".
- 2012 Hugh Ross, Founder and President of Reasons to Believe, spoke on "Theistic Implications of Big Bang Cosmology." Gerald Schroeder, Lecturer at The Aish HaTorah College of Jewish Studies in Jerusalem, Israel gave a talk titled "Genesis and the Big Bang."
- 2011 Henry F. Schaefer, III, Graham Perdue Professor of Chemistry and Director of the Center for Computational Chemistry at the University of Georgia gave a talk titled "C.S. Lewis: Science and Scientism." Francisco J. Ayala, University Professor and Donald Bren Professor of Biological Sciences, Ecology and Evolutionary Biology at the University of California, Irvine spoke on "Darwin's Gift to Science and Religion."
- 2010 Francis Everitt, Research Professor at the Hansen Experimental Physics Laboratory at Stanford University gave a talk titled "Mystery in Science, Reason in Religion: How the Two Intersect and Overlap", and Sir Roger Penrose, Emeritus Rouse Ball Professor of Mathematics at the University of Oxford gave a talk titled "Did the Universe Have a Beginning?"
- 2009 Owen Gingerich, Professor Emeritus of Astronomy and History of Science at Harvard University spoke on the "Mystery in Science, Reason in Religion: How the Two Intersect and Overlap", and Charles Townes, professor emeritus at University of California Berkeley and 1964 winner of the Nobel Prize in physics, spoke on "The Parallelism and Likely Eventual Convergence of Science and Religion"
- 2008 Francis S. Collins, Director of the National Human Genome Research Institute at the National Institutes of Health gave a talk titled "The Language of God", and Steven Weinberg, 1979 Nobel Prize in Physics recipient and professor of Physics & Astronomy at the University of Texas gave a talk titled "Without God"
- 2007 Simon Conway Morris, professor of Earth Sciences and holder of the Chair in Evolutionary Paleobiology at the University of Cambridge spoke on "Darwin's Compass: How Evolution Discovers the Song of Creation"
- 2006 Freeman Dyson, winner of the 2000 Templeton Prize for Progress in Religion Winner and Professor Emeritus of physics at the Institute for Advanced Study at Princeton spoke on "Heretical Thoughts about Science and Society"
- 2005 William D. Phillips, 1997 Nobel Prize in Physics Winner and Research Group Leader at the Physics Laboratory at the National Institute of Standards and Technology gave a talk titled "Ordinary Faith, Ordinary Science"
- 2005 William Dembski, Associate Research Professor at Baylor University gave a talk titled "Intelligent Design's Place in the Natural Sciences", and Stuart Kauffman, Director of the Institute for Biocomplexity and Informatics at the University of Calgary, gave a talk titled "Toward a Physical Definition of Life"
- 2004 Paul Davies, Professor of Natural Philosophy in the Australian Centre for Astrobiology at Macquarie University gave a talk titled "Did Life Come From Mars?" and Robert Shapiro, Professor Emeritus and Senior Lecturer of Chemistry at New York University spoke on "Science & Myth in the Origin of Life"
- 2003 Alan Guth, Father of the "inflationary universe" theory and Professor of Physics at The Massachusetts Institute of Technology gave a talk titled "Cosmic Inflation and the Origin of the Universe". and John Polkinghorne. an Anglican Priest and Former Professor of Mathematical Physics and President of Queens' College, Cambridge spoke on "The Universe as Creation"
- 2002 Francis Crick, 1962 Nobel Prize Winner in Medicine and Physiology who works at The Salk Institute gave a talk titled "The Astonishing Hypothesis" and Charles Townes, 1964 Nobel Prize in Physics at the University of California-Berkeley gave a talk titled "The Convergence of Science and Religion"
