= Theophysics =

Approach to reconcile physical religious cosmology

In philosophy, theophysics is an approach to cosmology that attempts to reconcile physical cosmology and religious cosmology. It is related to physicotheology, the difference between them being that the aim of physicotheology is to derive theology from physics, whereas that of theophysics is to unify physics and theology.

== Usage ==
Paul Richard Blum (2002) uses the term in a critique of physicotheology, i.e. the view that arguments for the existence of God can be derived from the existence of the physical world (e.g. the "argument from design"). Theophysics would be the opposite approach, i.e. an approach to the material world informed by the knowledge that it is created by God.

Richard H. Popkin (1990) applies the term to the "spiritual physics" of Cambridge Platonist Henry More and his pupil and collaborator Lady Anne Conway, who enthusiastically accepted the new science, but rejected the various forms of materialist mechanism proposed by Descartes, Hobbes and Spinoza to buttress it, as these, More and Conway argued, were incapable of explaining productive causality. Instead, More and Conway offered what Popkin calls "a genuine important alternative to modern mechanistic thought", "a thoroughly scientific view with a metaphysics of spirits to make everything operate". Materialist mechanism triumphed, however, and today their spiritual cosmology, as Popkin notes, "looks very odd indeed".

The term has been applied by some philosophers to the system of Emanuel Swedenborg. William Denovan (1889) wrote in Mind: "The highest stage of his revelation might be denominated Theophysics, or the science of Divine purpose in creation." R. M. Wenley (1910) referred to Swedenborg as "the Swedish theophysicist".

Pierre Laberge (1972) observes that Kant's famous critique of physicotheology in the Critique of Pure Reason (1781; second edition 1787) has tended to obscure the fact that in his early work, General History of Nature and Theory of the Heavens (1755), Kant defended a physicotheology that at the time was startlingly original, but that succeeded only to the extent that it concealed what Laberge terms a theophysics ("ce que nous appellerons une théophysique").

Theophysics is a fundamental concept in the thought of Raimon Panikkar, who wrote in Ontonomía de la ciencia (1961) that he was looking for "a theological vision of Science that is not a Metaphysics, but a Theophysics.... It is not a matter of a Physics 'of God', but rather of the 'God of the Physical'; of God the creator of the world... not the world as autonomous being, independent and disconnected from God, but rather ontonomicly linked to Him". As a vision of "Science as theology", it became central to Panikkar's "cosmotheandric" view of reality.

Frank J. Tipler's Omega Point theory (1994), which identifies concepts from physical cosmology with theistic concepts, is sometimes referred to by the term, although not by Tipler himself. Tipler was an atheist when he wrote The Anthropic Cosmological Principle (1986, co-authored with John D. Barrow, whose many popular books seldom mention theology) and The Physics of Immortality (1994), but a Christian when he wrote The Physics of Christianity (2007). In 1989, Wolfhart Pannenberg, a liberal theologian in the continental Protestant tradition, welcomed Tipler's work on cosmology as raising "the prospect of a rapprochement between physics and theology in the area of eschatology". In subsequent essays, while not concurring with all the details of Tipler's discussion, Pannenberg has defended the theology of the Omega Point.

== See also ==
- Anthropic principle
- Fine-tuned universe
- List of science and religion scholars
- Multiverse
- Natural theology
- Omega Point
- Tipler's Omega Point
- Ultimate fate of the universe
- Zygon: Journal of Religion and Science
