= Oak Ridge Institute for Science and Education =

Educational institution in Oak Ridge, Tennessee

The Oak Ridge Institute for Science and Education (ORISE) is an asset of the U.S. Department of Energy that provides expertise in STEM workforce development, scientific and technical reviews, and the evaluation of radiation exposure and environmental contamination. Located in Oak Ridge, Tennessee, ORISE was established in 1992 to support DOE's mission by prepare the next generation of STEM professionals and by collaborating with the DOE Office of Science and other DOE programs, federal agencies, the scientific community, and industry to address scientific initiatives.

== Overview ==
The ORISE mission is focused on five areas that support the U.S. Department of Energy's overall mission. Mission areas include recruiting and preparing the next generation of the United States scientific workforce; promoting sound scientific and technical investment decisions through independent peer reviews; facilitating and preparing for the medical management of radiation incidents around the world; evaluating health outcomes in individuals exposed to chemical and radiological hazards; and ensuring public confidence in environmental cleanup through independent environmental verification activities.

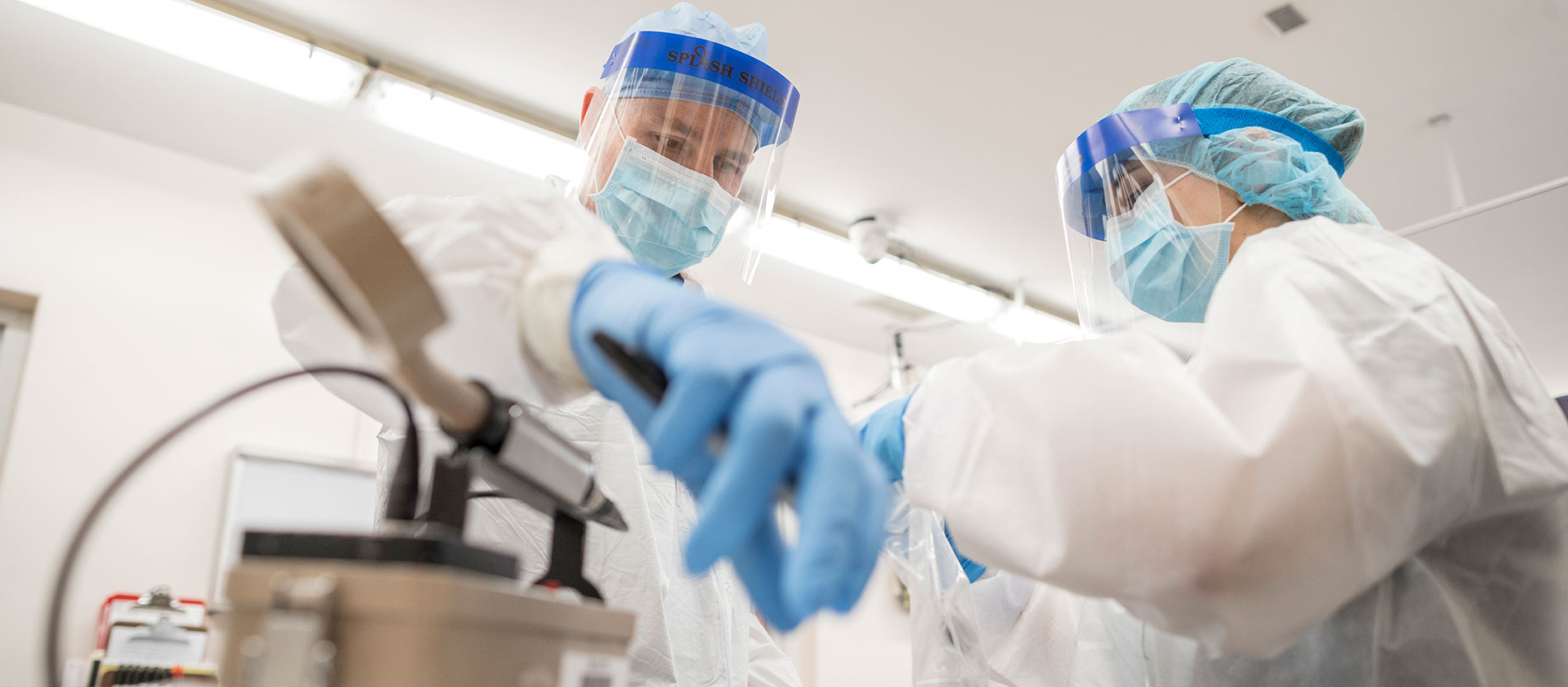
Medical professionals participate in a REAC/TS Continuing Medical Education course

The Radiation Emergency Assistance Center/Training Site (REAC/TS) operates as a part of ORISE. REAC/TS provides emergency response and subject matter expertise on the medical management of radiation incidents for the National Nuclear Security Administration’s Office of Counterterrorism and Counterproliferation. A cytogenetics biodosimetry laboratory was established within ORISE to provide capabilities for measuring radiation dose and to conduct research to improve techniques for determining the doses received by victims of radiological accidents.

REAC/TS is designated as a Pan American Health Organization/World Health Organization Collaborating Centre, which are key institutions that provide expertise and function as an extension of the international public health agency’s mission to improve health outcomes for all people. ORISE is managed by Oak Ridge Associated Universities. Its operations are overseen by the Oak Ridge National Laboratory Site Office.

== History ==
Elements of the DOE asset now known as Oak Ridge Institute for Science and Education were originally conceived by University of Tennessee physics professor Dr. William G. Pollard to cultivate a peacetime purpose for the nuclear science generated by the Manhattan Project. This vision became a reality on October 17, 1946, when the Oak Ridge Institute of Nuclear Studies received a charter of incorporation from the state of Tennessee. Although the name later changed to Oak Ridge Associated Universities, the organization's mission generally remained the same as the programs it managed evolved over time.

In 1992, DOE consolidated many of these legacy programs into what became known as ORISE. DOE selected ORAU to manage the initial ORISE contract and has continuously managed ORISE for more than 30 years. DOE established ORISE with an operating budget of $75 million, encompassing programs long-managed for DOE by ORAU in science education, training, and environmental/occupational health.
