= William Denovan =

Scottish philosopher

William Denovan was a Scottish philosopher with an interest in theophysics and physics. One of the earliest occurrences of the term multiverse used in reference to the physical world is due to Denovan, in a letter to Scientific American in 1873.

== Selected publications ==
- 1889. William Denovan, "A Swedenborgian View of the Problem of Philosophy", Mind, Vol. 14, No. 54 (April 1889), pp. 216–229.
