= Harold K. Schilling =

American physics professor (1899–1979)

Harold K. Schilling (February 7, 1899 – April 29, 1979) was a professor of physics at Pennsylvania State University. He had served as chairman of the physics department and then as dean of the graduate school. He also wrote extensively about science and religion.

== Works ==
- The structure of absorption bands in the spectrum of aqueous solutions of potassium permanganate (Master thesis) (1928)
- I. Mosaic crystals of zinc. II. Growth of crystals of zinc containing cadmium, by the Czochralski-Gomperz method (Ph.D. Thesis from the University of Iowa) (1935)
- Supersonic signalling (1945)
- The university and the church (1955)
- Concerning the nature of science and religion : a study of presuppositions (1958)
- The role of the church in higher education (1958)
- "A Human Enterprise: Science as lived by its practitioners bears but little resemblance to science as described in print." Science, June 6, 1958, 127(3310), pages 1324-1327.
- "On Relating Science and Religion," The Christian Scholar, Volume XLI, No. 3, September, 1958, pages 376-7.

Science and Religion: An Interpretation of Two Communities, New York: Charles Scribner's Sons, 1962

- Review: Robert E. McBride, The Journal of Religion, Volume 44, Issue 3, (July 1964), pages 267-269
- Review: Mary B. Hesse, Journal for the Scientific Study of Religion, Volume 3, Issue 1, (Autumn, 1963), page 112-113

- Seeing the unseen (1963)
- On the significance of science for religious thought (1964)
- Science with Christian concern (1964)
- On physics as one of the humanities (1965)
- A conversation with Harold Schilling by North Carolina State University (1966)
- Chapter 5 "The Threefold Nature of Science and Religion" (pp. 78–100) in Science and Religion: New Perspectives on the Dialogue, Editor Ian Barbour, Harper & Row, 1968
- A theology of nature (1970)
- Usages of the term mystery (1972)
- The New Consciousness in Science and Religion, 1973 United Church Press, 288 pages, ISBN 0-8298-0247-9

== Citations ==
In Margenau, H. (1992). Cosmos, Bios, Theos Scientists Reflect on Science, God, and the Origins of the Universe, Life, and Homo sapiens. Open Court Publishing Company. co-edited with Roy Abraham Varghese, Henry Margenau answers the question "What do you think should be the relationship between religion and science?" (page 58) in part

"A book entitled Science and Religion (1962) by Harold Schilling is also recommended, for it contains a large number of factual instances allowing comparisons between the two fields."

== See also ==
- List of science and religion scholars
