= Day-age creationism =

Metaphorical interpretation of the creation accounts in Genesis

Day-age creationism is an interpretation of the creation accounts in Genesis. It holds that the six days referred to in the Genesis account of creation are not literal 24-hour days, but are much longer periods (from thousands to billions of years). The Genesis account is then reconciled with the age of the Earth. Proponents of the day-age theory can be found among both theistic evolutionists, who accept the scientific consensus on evolution, and progressive creationists, who reject it. The theories are said to be built on the understanding that the Hebrew word yom is also used to refer to a time period, with a beginning and an end and not necessarily that of a 24-hour day. It is a subset of Old Earth creationism.

The differences between the young Earth interpretation of Genesis and modern scientific theories believed by some day-age creationists such as the Big Bang, abiogenesis, and common descent are significant. The young Earth interpretation says that everything in the universe and on Earth was created in six 24-hour days, estimated to have occurred some 6,000 years ago. Modern scientific observations, however, put the age of the universe at 13.8 billion years and the Earth at 4.5 billion years, with various forms of life, including humans, being formed gradually over time.

The day-age theory attempts to reconcile the Genesis creation narrative and modern science by asserting that the creation "days" are not literal 24-hour days, but actually lasted for long periods of time (as day-age implies, the "days" each lasted an age). According to this view, the sequence and duration of the creation "days" may be paralleled to the scientific consensus for the age of the Earth and the age of the universe.

== History ==
A kind of figurative view can be traced back at least to Saint Augustine in the 5th century who pointed out, in De Genesi ad litteram (On the Literal [Interpretation of] Genesis) that the "days" in Genesis could not be literal days, if only because Genesis itself tells us that the sun was not made until the fourth "day".

Scottish lawyer and geologist Charles Lyell published his famous and influential work Principles of Geology in 1830–1833 which interpreted geologic change as the steady accumulation of minute changes over enormously long spans of time and that natural processes, uniformly applied over the length of that existence (uniformitarianism), could account for what men saw and studied in creation.

In the mid 19th century, American geologist Arnold Guyot sought to harmonize science and scripture by interpreting the "days" of Genesis 1 as epochs in cosmic history. Similar views were held by a protégé of Lyell, John William Dawson, who was a prominent Canadian geologist and commentator, from an orthodox perspective, on science and religion in the latter part of the 19th century. Dawson was a special creationist, but not a biblical literalist, admitting that the days of creation represented long periods of time, that the Genesis flood was only 'universal' from the narrator's limited perspective, and that it was only humanity, not the Earth itself, that was of recent creation.

American geologist and seminarian George Frederick Wright was originally a leading Christian Darwinist. However reaction against higher criticism in biblical scholarship and the influence of James Dwight Dana led him to become increasingly theologically conservative. By the first decade of the 20th century he joined forces with the emerging fundamentalist movement in advocating against evolution, penning an essay for The Fundamentals entitled "The Passing of Evolution". In these later years Wright believed that the "days" of Genesis represented geological ages and argued for the special creation of several plant and animal species "and at the same time endowed them with the marvellous capacity for variation which we know they possess." His statements on whether there had been a separate special creation of humanity were contradictory.

Probably the most famous day-age creationist was American politician, anti-evolution campaigner and Scopes Trial prosecutor William Jennings Bryan. Unlike many of his conservative followers, Bryan was not a strict biblical literalist, and had no objection to "evolution before man but for the fact that a concession as to the truth of evolution up to man furnishes our opponents with an argument which they are quick to use, namely, if evolution accounts for all the species up to man, does it not raise a presumption in behalf of evolution to include man?" He considered defining the days in Genesis 1 to be twenty-four hours to be a pro-evolution straw man argument to make attacking creationists easier, and admitted under questioning at the Scopes trial that the world was far older than six thousand years, and that the days of creation were probably longer than twenty-four hours each.

American Baptist preacher and anti-evolution campaigner William Bell Riley, "The Grand Old Man of Fundamentalism", founder of the World Christian Fundamentals Association and of the Anti-Evolution League of America was another prominent day-age creationist in the first half of the 20th century, who defended this position in a famous debate with friend and prominent young Earth creationist Harry Rimmer.

One modern defender is astronomer Hugh Ross, who in 1994 wrote Creation and Time defending the day-age view in great detail, and who founded the day-age creationist ministry Reasons to Believe.

Another person who has defended the view is Rodney Whitefield.

While Jehovah's Witnesses adhere to the belief that the six days of Creation in Genesis lasted millions of years, they reject the usage of the term "creationism" to describe their beliefs.

== Interpretation of Genesis ==
Day-Age creationists differ from young Earth creationists in how they interpret a number of crucial Hebrew words in Genesis, and thus how they interpret the genealogies and creation account contained in it.

They point out that the Hebrew words for father ('ab) and son (ben) can also mean forefather and descendent, respectively, and that the Biblical scripture occasionally "telescopes" genealogies to emphasise the more important ancestors. This, they argue, renders genealogically based dating of the Creation, such as the Ussher chronology, to be inaccurate.

They admit that yom can mean a twenty-four hour solar day, but argue that it can refer to an indefinitely long period of time. In their view, it is in this sense that the word is employed in Genesis 2:4, with a "day" of God's total creation taking place in the course of "days" of creation.

Day-age creationists often point to phenomena such as the Cambrian explosion as evidence of one of the Creation "days" appearing in the fossil record as a long period of time.

Hugh Ross interprets Day 1 and Day 4 of the Genesis creation account as follows: On Day 1, although the heavens, including the Sun and Moon, were already created, light did not reach the surface because the atmosphere was opaque. By Day 4, the atmosphere became transparent enough for celestial bodies to be visible, enabling animals to use them to regulate biological clocks. He associates a rise in atmospheric oxygen during Precambrian that reduced haze and cloud cover with his interpretation. He also interprets the plants in Genesis 1 as oxygen-producing microorganisms and suggests that land animals could have been created on Day 5 as well, arguing that the animals created on Day 6 are those necessary for human activity.

== See also ==
- Biblical cosmology
- Chronology of the universe
- Creator deity
- Dating creation
- Genesis 1:5
- Genesis creation narrative
- Theistic evolution
- Yom
