= Leshan, Peja =

Leshan: Leshan (Albanian); Lešane (Serbian)
- Village
- Location in Kosovo
- Location: Kosovo
- District: Peja
- Municipality: Peja
- Elevation: 418 m (1,371 ft)

Population (2011)
  - Total: 622
- Time zone: UTC+1 (CET)
  - Summer (DST): UTC+2 (CEST)

Leshan (Albanian: Leshan, definite form: Leshani; Serbian: Lješane Serbian: Љешане) is a settlement in the municipality of Peja in western Kosovo.

It has 622 inhabitants according to a 2024 census, with an ethnic Albanian majority and an Ashkali and Balkan Egyptian minority. It lies 418 metres (1,371 ft) above sea level.

== Geography ==
Leshan is located 12 kilometres (7.5 mi) south of the city of Pejë on the Pristina-Peja highway. To the east of the village of Leshan flows the Lumbardhi River which originates in the Rugova Mountains; after flowing through the heart of Peja, it continues towards Grabanicë in Klina, where it merges into the White Drin. This river separates the Leshan Valley (Leshan River Basin) from the Baran Valley; the village is bordered to the south by Kliçina to the west by Sferka , and to the north by Gllaviçica.
