= Eda LeShan =

American writer and educator (1922–2002)

LeShan in 1973

Eda LeShan (June 6, 1922 – March 3, 2002) was an American writer, television host, counselor, educator, and playwright. She was a "voice of respect for the inherent integrity of children." LeShan was married to Lawrence LeShan, an American psychologist and writer.

She was the host of How Do Your Children Grow? on PBS in the 1970s.

== Views ==
Education is in danger of becoming a religion based on fear; its doctrine is to compete. Our children are being led to believe that they are doomed to failure in a world which has room only for those at the top ... in all our efforts to provide "advantages" we have actually produced the busiest, most competitive, highly pressured and over-organized generation of youngsters in our history and possibly the unhappiest.

== Selected books ==
- When Your Child Drives You Crazy
- The Conspiracy Against Childhood
- It's Better to be Over the Hill than Under It.
