= Lawrence LeShan =

American psychologist (1920–2020)

- Born: September 8, 1920
- Died: November 9, 2020 (aged 100)
- Occupations: psychologist, parapsychologist, educator, and author
- Known for: psychological intervention for cancer

Lawrence LeShan (September 8, 1920 – November 9, 2020) was an American psychologist, educator, and the author of the best-selling How to Meditate (1974) a practical guide to meditation. He authored or co-authored approximately 75 articles in the professional literature and more than fifteen books on a diverse range of topics including psychotherapy, war, cancer treatment, and mysticism. He also authored science fiction using the pseudonym Edward Grendon.

== Biography ==
LeShan received a bachelor's degree from The College of William and Mary, a masters degree from University of Nebraska and a Ph.D. in Human Development from the University of Chicago. He taught at Pace College, Roosevelt University, and the New School for Social Research. He worked as a clinical and research psychologist for more than 50 years, including six years as a psychologist in the United States Army. He served in the army from 1943 to 1946 and from 1950 to 1952.

During the 1960s and 1970s, LeShan conducted extensive research concerning parapsychology. In his book The Medium, the Mystic, and the Physicist: Toward a General Theory of the Paranormal, he investigated paranormal topics, mystical thought and quantum mechanics. In the book LeShan claimed to have tested his hypothesis of "clairvoyant reality". He said the results were a success and he could heal with mental power and train others to do the same. However, Tim Healey wrote that the results were not convincing as nine of his students had eight attempts at using a clairvoyant training technique and all scored four to fives misses.

In World of the Paranormal: The Next Frontier, LeShan advanced his paranormal ideas further, claiming that psychic abilities such as clairvoyance, precognition, and telepathy can be explained using quantum theory.

During the 1980s, LeShan's emphasis changed to the psychotherapy of cancer support, a topic for which he is considered a pioneer.

LeShan lived in New York City. He was married to Eda LeShan (1922..2002), who was also a writer. He died at the age of 100 in 2020.

== Publications ==
- The Medium, the Mystic, and the Physicist: Toward a General Theory of the Paranormal (1974)
- How to Meditate: A Guide to Self-Discovery (1974)
- Alternate Realities: The Search for the Full Human Being (1976)
- You Can Fight For Your Life: Emotional Factors in the Treatment of Cancer (1980)
- Einstein's Space & Van Gogh's Sky: Physical Reality and Beyond (with Henry Margenau)(1982)
- The Mechanic and the Gardener: How to Make the Most of the Holistic Revolution in Medicine (Introduction by Norman Cousins) (1982)
- Holistic Health: How to Understand and Use the Revolution in Medicine (1984)
- From Newton to Esp: Parapsychology and the Challenge of Modern Science (1985)
- Cancer As a Turning Point: A Handbook for People with Cancer, Their Families, and Health Professionals (1994)
- An Ethic for the Age of Space: A Touchstone for Conduct Among the Stars (1996)
- Beyond Technique: Psychotherapy for the 21st Century (1996)
- The Dilemma of Psychology: A Psychologist Looks at His Troubled Profession (2002)
- The Psychology of War: Comprehending Its Mystique and Its Madness (2002)
- World of the Paranormal: The Next Frontier (2004)
- Patriotism for Grownups (with Eda J. LeShan)(2005)
- The Pattern of Evil: Myth, Social Perception and the Holocaust (2006)
- A New Science of the Paranormal: the Promise of Psychical Research (2009)
- Landscapes of the Mind: The Faces of Reality (2012)
