= William G. Pollard =

American physicist (1911-1989)

The Reverend William G. Pollard
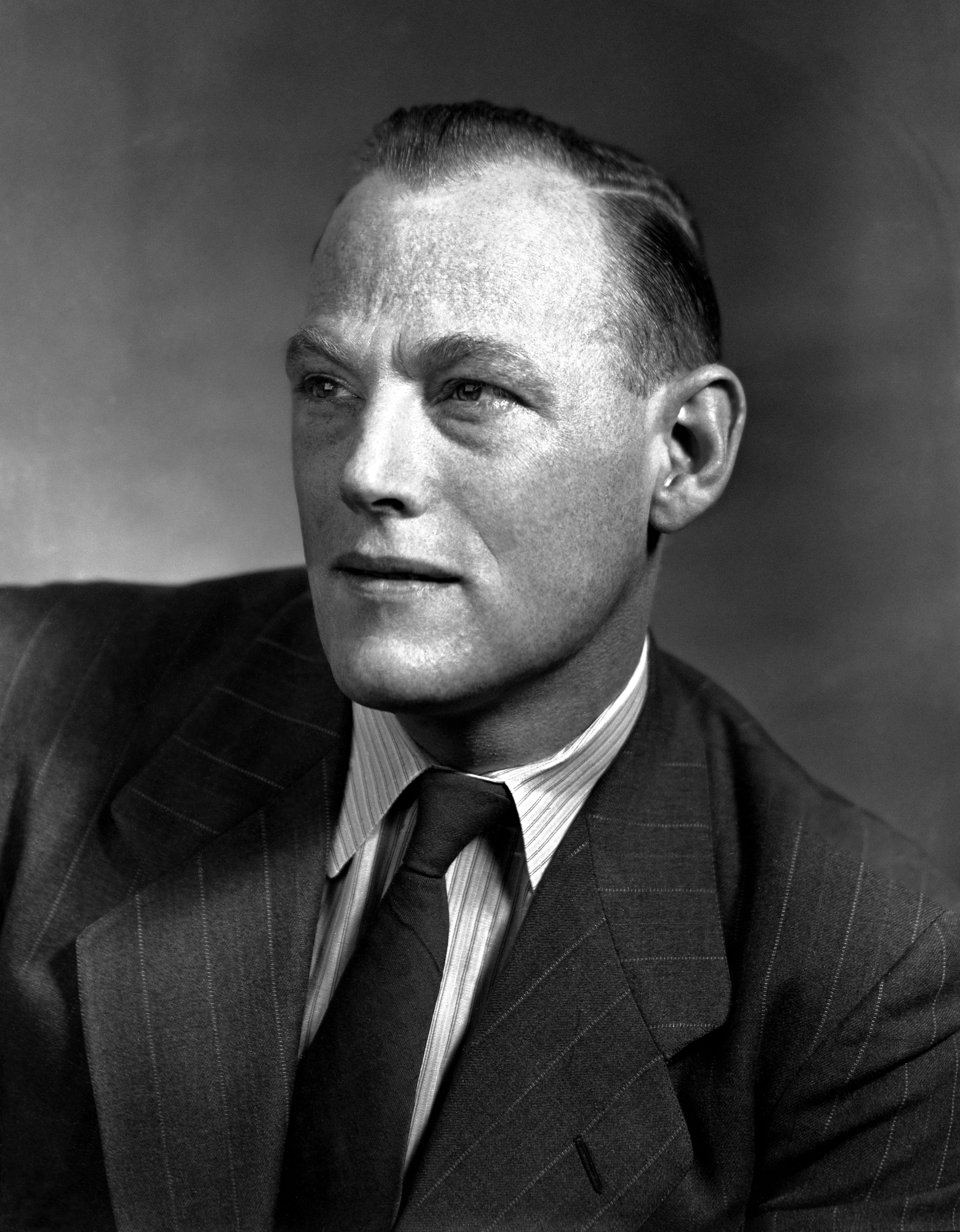
- Pollard in 1948
- Born: William Grosvenor Pollard; 1911; Batavia, New York, US
- Died: 1989 (aged 77–78)
- Education: University of Tennessee; Rice University
- Known for: Gaseous diffusion Founding the Oak Ridge Associated Universities; Physicist and Christian (1961)
- Spouse: Marcella (m. 1932)
- Scientific career
- Fields: Nuclear physics
- Workplaces: University of Tennessee
- Thesis: On the Theory of Beta-Ray Type of Radio-active Disintegration (1935)

Ecclesiastical career
- Religion: Christianity (Anglican)
- Church: Episcopal Church (United States)
- Ordained: 1952

William Grosvenor Pollard (1911–1989) was an American physicist and an Episcopal priest. He started his career as a professor of physics in 1936 at the University of Tennessee. In 1946 he championed the organization of the Oak Ridge Institute of Nuclear Studies (ORINS). He was its executive director until 1974. He was ordained as a priest in 1954. He authored and co-authored a significant amount of material in the areas of Christianity and Science and Religion found in books, book chapters, and journal articles. He was sometimes referred to as the "atomic deacon".

== Life ==
He was born in Batavia, New York, in 1911. His father, Arthur L. Pollard, a mining engineer and bacteriologist, moved the family to Knoxville, Tennessee, when Pollard was twelve. Pollard had been raised in the Episcopal faith, but in high school ventured into the Unitarian Church. After three years, he also gave that up. After marriage in 1932, he again began to attend Episcopal services. He received a Bachelor of Arts degree from University of Tennessee in 1932 and Master of Arts and Doctor of Philosophy degrees from Rice University in 1934 and 1935, respectively. His thesis was entitled On the Theory of Beta-Ray Type of Radio-active Disintegration. In 1936 he joined the University of Tennessee as a faculty member, becoming a full professor in 1943.

=== Manhattan Project ===
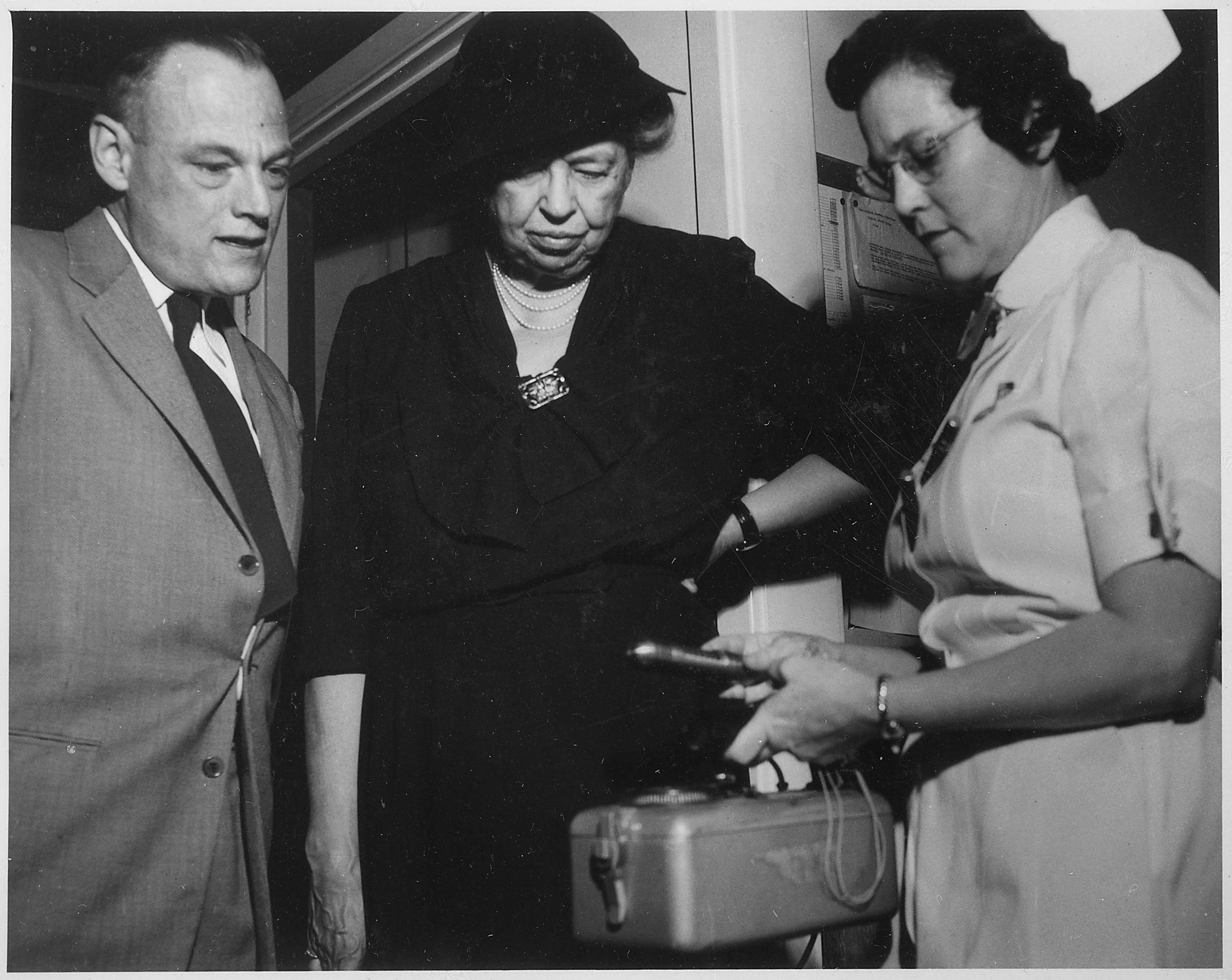
Pollard (left) and Eleanor Roosevelt (center) watch as a nurse demonstrates a radiation counter during Roosevelt's 1955 visit to the Oak Ridge cancer research hospital

In 1944 under the cover of Columbia University's Special Alloys and Metals Laboratory, he was asked to join the Manhattan Project. He did research on a gaseous diffusion extraction method of U-235 from common uranium. He initially worked at Columbia University's Pupin Physics Laboratories.

=== Ordination ===
He was ordained on Ember Wednesday, December 17, 1952. His four sons, then aged 10 to 17, served as acolytes. Numerous scientists and employees from Oak Ridge Institute of Nuclear Studies attended along with several reporters and photographers.

== Position on the relation of religion and science ==
Pollard's position on the relation of religion and science involves God acting through quantum indeterminacy. His position is thought to be similar to that of Karl Heim, J. J. Thomson, Arthur Compton, George Thomson, E. T. Whittaker, and Eric Mascall.

=== Continuing influence ===
The book The Frontiers of Science & Faith: Examining Questions from the Big Bang to the End of the Universe (2002) credits Pollard in making important contributions to a significant train of thought on religion and quantum indeterminacy that has led to further ideas about religion and chaos theory. Chapter 5 of Divine Action and Modern Science (Cambridge University Press, 2002) is divided into three sections: "Pre-Pollard quantum SDA", "William Pollard", and "Post-Pollard quantum SDA".

== Fiftieth anniversary of Kent School ==
At an ecumenical seminar held in honor of the fiftieth anniversary of Kent School (1955), Pollard was one of eight distinguished speakers giving talks on The Christian Idea of Education. According to acting New York Times reporter Edward N. West, a Canon of New York Cathedral St. John the Divine and author of Mediations on the Gospel of St. John, "the speakers were as distinguished as authentic Christianity produces." Other speakers included Princeton University historian and Presbyterian layman E. Harris Harbison, Cry, The Beloved Country author and Anglican layman Alan Paton, Professor of Liturgics and Episcopal priest Massey H. Shepherd, Roman Catholic priest John Courtney Murray, Roman Catholic layman and then professor emeritus of Princeton University Jacques Maritain, Russian Orthodox priest and then Harvard University professor Georges Florovsky, and Protestant theologian Reinhold Niebuhr. According to West, "These contributors are so excellent, the thinking on so high a level, that any intelligent reader will be excited. The Christian position has never been better stated." Pollard and Edmund Fuller co-edited the results of this seminary, which were published as The Christian idea of education: papers and discussions (Yale University Press, 1958).

== Published works ==
- "The Significance of Complementarity for the Life Sciences American Journal of Physics", American Journal of Physics, May 1952, Volume 20, Issue 5, pp. 281–288
- The Christian idea of education: papers and discussions, co-edited with Edmund Fuller (1958), Yale University Press

Dr. Pollard, the Chairman, added: "The purpose of this seminar is to examine and identify in a fundamental fashion the peculiar characteristics of the educational processes and objectives which constitute the Christian idea of education. The emphasis will not be on religious perspectives in teaching, nor on the problems of the Christian teacher, but will rather be concerned with education in its entirety from a Christian viewpoint.

- Schools and Scholarship: The Christian Idea of Education: Part 2, co-edited with Edmund Fuller (1962), Yale University Press

The formal addresses by the university professors are, by and large, re-enactments of the ritual of Loving One's Subject. They are eloquent pleas, on behalf of this, that or the other discipline, for a greater share in the students' time. Most of the real moments of constructive excitement come in the discussions. ...There are two startling exceptions to the generalization about the contribution of the university people. These exceptions are the scientists. The most exquisite statement of what the process of education should be is not to be found amid the majestic vivacity of the humanists but in the conversational, almost casual speech by Edward Teller, the physicist. The most acute and moving theology is contributed by the executive director of the Oak Ridge Institute of Nuclear Studies, the Rev. William G. Pollard. Their utterances explain why it has been, of all things, the dramatic demands of science on the high-school curricula that have, after thirty-five years of stagnation, at last produced the beginnings of a new humanism in American education.

- The Hebrew Iliad : the history of the rise of Israel under Saul and David : written during the reign of Solomon probably by the priest Ahimaaz, co-authored with Robert Henry Pfeiffer, Harper (1957)
- Chance and providence: God's action in a world governed by scientific law, Faber and Faber and Charles Scribner's Sons, (1958) (full text )
- Physicist and Christian: A Dialogue Between the Communities (1st published 1961; 2nd pub. 1964), Seabury Press (full text )
- Atomic energy and southern science; the impact of the Nation's atomic energy program on the development of science and technology in the South since 1946, Oak Ridge Associated Universities (1966)
- Science and faith: twin mysteries, T. Nelson (1970)
- The mystery of matter, U.S. Atomic Energy Commission (1970)
- Transcendence and providence : reflections of a physicist and priest, Scottish Academic Press (1986), ISBN 0-7073-0486-5
- Long-range prospects for solar-derived fuels, American Scientist, Vol/Issue: 64:5, 1976 Jan 01
- "The Recovery of Theological Perspective in a Scientific Age" (pp. 22–43) in Religion and the University (1964) Edited by Jaroslav Pelikan, University of Toronto Press
- The Moral Implications of Energy: Its Production, Distribution and Use, By William G Pollard, Frederick S Carney, Thomas J. Reese, Published by America Press, 1981, (published as special issue of Catholic Mind October 1981)
- "The Faith of a Physicist" in Modern Canterbury Pilgrims: The Story of Twenty-three Converts and why They Chose the Anglican Communion, James Albert Pike, Stephen Neill, Wystan Hugh Auden, New York, Mowbray, London: Morehouse-Gorham, 1956, 317 pages

Review of book in Time Magazine: Travelers at Home, Monday, May. 28, 1956

- "Creation by Alternative Histories", Chapter 16 of Science, Faith, and Revelation: An Approach to Christian Philosophy (A festschrift for Eric Rust), Bob E. Patterson, Eric Charles Rust, Broadman Press, 1979, ISBN 0-8054-1809-1, 371 pages
