= Karl Heim =

German theologian (1874–1958)

- Born: May 8, 1874; Frauenzimmern
- Died: 30 August 1958; Tübingen
- Known for: Religion and Science theology

Academic background
- Influences: Søren Kierkegaard

Academic work
- Institutions: Münster; Tübingen
- Influenced: William G. Pollard

Karl Heim (20 January 1874 – 30 August 1958) was a professor of dogmatics at Münster and Tübingen. He retired in 1939. His idea of God controlling quantum events that do and would seem otherwise random has been seen as the precursor to much of the current studies on divine action. His current influence upon religion and science theology has been compared in degree to that of the physicist and theologian Ian Barbour and of the scientist and theological organizer Ralph Wendell Burhoe. His doctrine on the transcendence of God has been thought to anticipate important points of later religious and science discussions, including the application of Thomas Kuhn's idea of a paradigm to religion and Thomas F. Torrance's theory of multileveled knowledge. Mention of Heim's physical and theological concept of extra-dimensional space can be found in a 2001 puzzle book by the popular mathematics writer Martin Gardner. His concept of space has also been discussed by Ian Barbour himself, who in a review of the book Christian Faith and Natural Science (English translation, 1953, Harper & Brothers) and in a mention of "its more technical sequel" The Transformation of the Scientific World-View (English translation, 1943, Harper & Brothers), found it to be "an illuminating insight."

== Place amongst German scholars ==
Until the late 1960s Karl Heim's call for a religion and science dialogue was a lone voice amongst German theologians. Within the realm of German scientists who were also Christian laity or religious proponents, Heim's views did however have contemporary company. So while German theologians Karl Barth and Rudolph Bultmann discouraged all types of interdisciplinary religious dialogue with science or any other intellectual discipline, scientists such as Max Planck, Werner Heisenberg, Otto Hahn, Gunther Howe, and Carl Friedrich von Weizsacker readily participated in religion and science dialogues from the 1930s onward. In the 1960s Anglo-American Creationism-type religion and science dialogues (in particular young earth) began to be promoted by A.E. Wilder-Smith and others involved in the Karl-Heim-Gesellschaft (i.e., the Karl Heim Society).

== Concept of spaces ==
Heim's analog of spaces has been subject to some criticism. He appeared to use a scientific concept to create a new natural-supernatural relationship using a fourth dimension, which, in modern physics, cannot be visualized, and relates to mathematical and physical measurements and is always expressed as a mathematical equation. He proposed a "suprapolar" space which was experiential, interpersonal and non-objectifiable and would exist alongside conventional space-time within an "archetypal" space. This space would be the abode of God, but also the experiencing subject connecting to God and other beings.

== Publications ==
- Christian faith and natural science (1953) full text
- The transformation of the scientific world view (1953)
- Jesus the Lord; the sovereign authority of Jesus and God's revelation in Christ (1959)
- Jesus, the world's perfecter : the atonement and the renewal of the world (1959)
- The world: its creation and consummation (1962) full text
- God transcendent; foundation for a Christian metaphysic (1935)
- Germany's new religion; the German faith movement(1937)
- The nature of Protestantism (1963)
- The church of Christ and the problems of the day (1935)
- Spirit and truth; the nature of evangelical Christianity (1935)
- The world : its creation and consummation : the end of the present age and the future of the world in the light of the resurrection (1952)
- The Living fountain; a series of sermons (1936)
- The new divine order (1930)
- The gospel of the cross; a second series of sermons (1937)
- The power of God (1937)
