= Oak Ridge Associated Universities =

Consortium of American universities

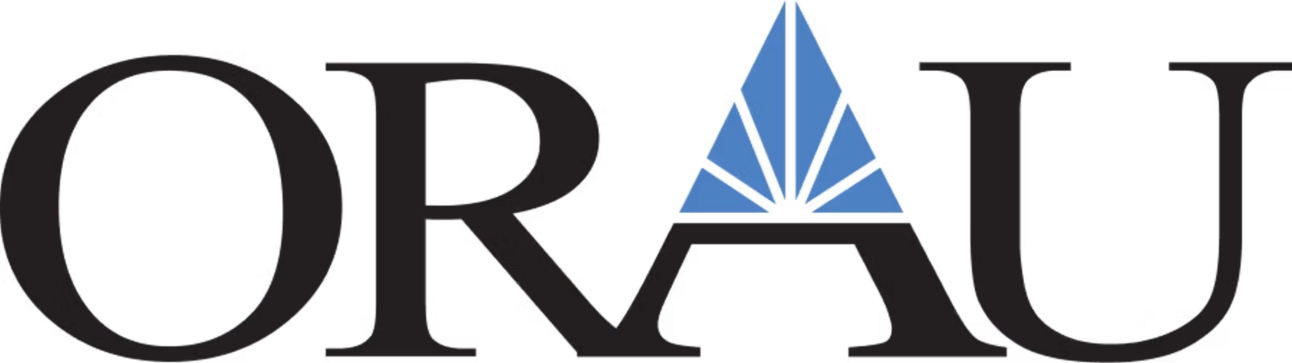
- Abbreviation: ORAU
- Formation: 1946
- Legal status: Active
- Headquarters: Oak Ridge, Tennessee, U.S.
- Members: 160+ colleges and universities
- President: Meghan Millwood
- Website: orau.org
- Formerly called: Oak Ridge Institute of Nuclear Studies (ORINS)

Oak Ridge Associated Universities (ORAU) is a consortium of American universities headquartered in Oak Ridge, Tennessee, with offices in Arvada, Colorado and Cincinnati, Ohio and staff at other locations across the country.

== History ==
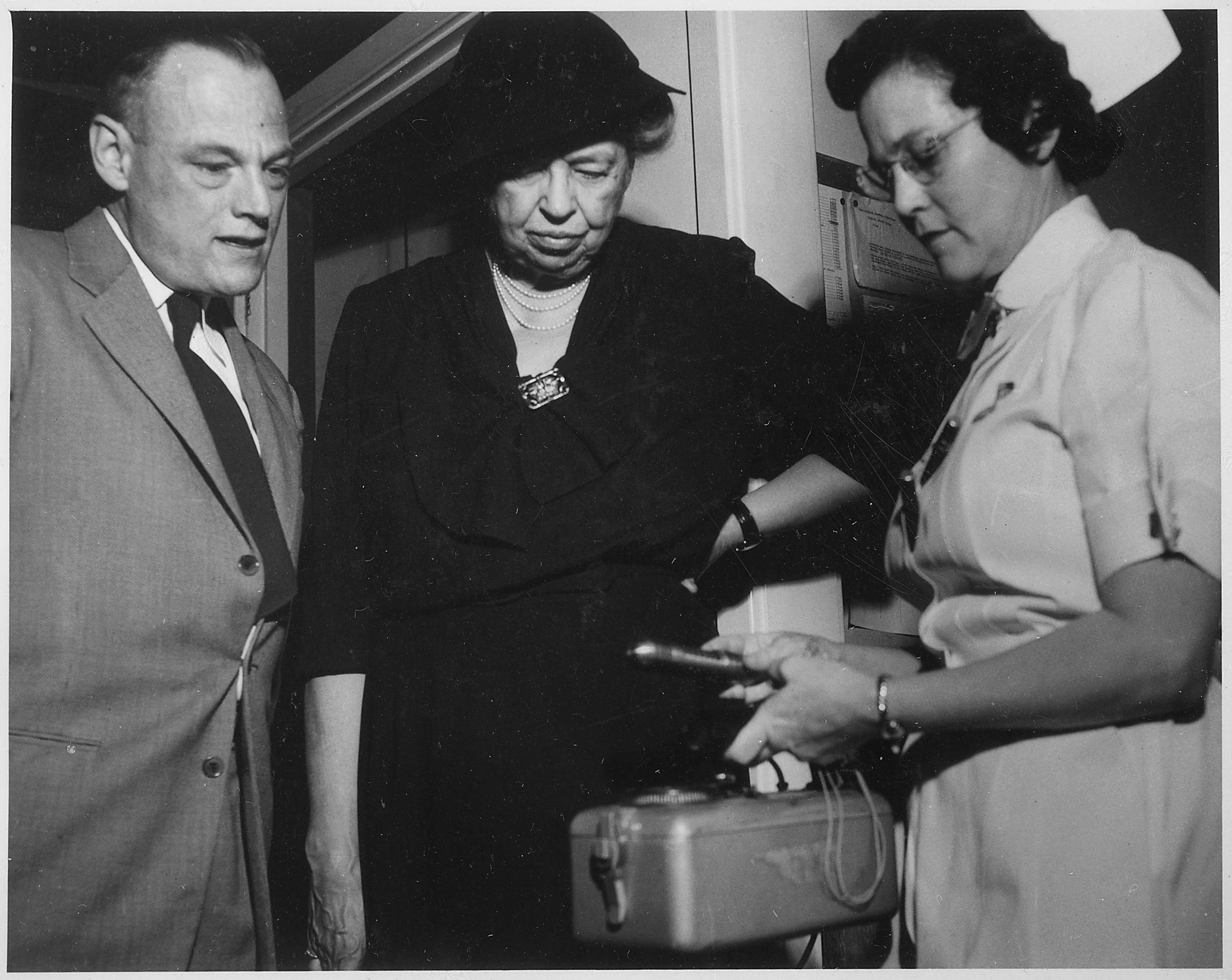
Eleanor Roosevelt (center) and William G. Pollard watch as Nurse Mary Sutliff demonstrates a radiation counter during Roosevelt's 1955 visit to the Oak Ridge cancer research hospital. (Photo by Ed Westcott)

The organization was first established in 1946 as the Oak Ridge Institute of Nuclear Studies (ORINS) with 14 university members. Its original purpose was to advance science and technology education and research by providing access to the atomic energy research facilities of the Oak Ridge National Laboratory (ORNL) to faculty and students of universities across the South. The Institute also served to provide access to university faculty for ORNL researchers, arranging for University of Tennessee faculty to teach master's and doctoral courses in chemistry, math, and physics in Oak Ridge using ORNL facilities, equipment, and supplies. University of Tennessee faculty member William G. Pollard developed the institution from a suggestion by ORNL physicist Katharine Way; Pollard would be elected the Institute's first executive director, a position he would hold until 1974. The name Oak Ridge Associated Universities was adopted in 1966.

In 1950, ORINS opened a hospital where it conducted clinical research for the United States Atomic Energy Commission on the use of radiation and radioactive materials in cancer treatment. The hospital treated patients until the mid-1970s. ORINS also conducted training courses in radioisotopes and established resident training programs in nuclear medicine. In the 1980s, clinical research at ORINS was the subject of investigation by the Advisory Committee on Human Radiation Experiments.

The Institute for Energy Analysis was organized as a unit of ORAU in January 1974, under the leadership of former Oak Ridge National Laboratory director Alvin Weinberg. This institute's focus was the evaluation of alternatives for meeting future energy requirements. From 1976 until it ceased operation with Weinberg's retirement in 1984, the Institute for Energy Analysis was a center for the study of diverse issues related to carbon dioxide and global climate.

In the mid-1970s, ORAU operated the Training And Technology (TAT) Project, an effort to provide marketable technical skills to the disadvantaged unemployed. TAT taught basic sciences as well as technical skill concentrations, such as welding, machining, mechanical operations, drafting and physical testing. Employment search assistance was provided to trainees to integrate with regional industrial company opportunities.

The Radiation Emergency Assistance Center/Training Site (REAC/TS) was established by ORAU in 1976 to provide onsite emergency medical services, advice, and consultation for incidents involving radiation anywhere in the world.

== Current mission and programs ==
ORAU's mission continues to be the advancement of scientific research and education. ORAU operates the Oak Ridge Institute for Science and Education (ORISE) under contract to the Department of Energy. ORISE provides operational capabilities dedicated to enabling critical scientific, research, and health initiatives for the department and its laboratory system by providing world class expertise in STEM workforce development, scientific and technical reviews, and the evaluation of radiation exposure and environmental contamination.

Health physics and epidemiology continue to be major areas of activity for ORAU. Activities include radiological surveys, dose reconstruction, and health screening for workers who may have been exposed to radioactive material, or other toxins. Since 1948, ORAU has also provided radiation safety and health physics training through its Professional Training Programs (PTP).

== Members ==
ORAU defines two levels of membership, "sponsoring institution" and "associate member." Sponsoring institutions must be non-profit, accredited universities granting doctoral degrees in relevant fields ("complementary to the interests of ORAU members and/or the programs of ORAU itself"), and either among the top schools in the U.S. by Carnegie Classification or National Science Foundation research spending, or have offered doctoral degrees in multiple STEM fields for at least five years. Associate members are not required to be non-profit, but must be accredited and offer graduate degrees in at least two science, engineering, or math fields; be recommended by an existing sponsoring institution or ORAU program; and receive a significant amount of NSF or other federal research funding.

The ORAU consortium comprises more than 160 sponsoring institutions and associate members, as of April 2025. Several institutions (48 as of April 2025) are additionally members of ORAU's Minority Serving Institutions (MSI) Research Council, created to foster "relationships between these schools" serving historically disadvantaged communities in the US "and some of the larger laboratories and research universities in America", and increase participation by members of minority communities in scientific research.

=== Sponsoring institutions ===
- Alabama A&M University (Note: Member of ORAU's MSI Research Council)
- Arizona State University
- Arkansas State University
- Auburn University
- Augusta University
- Carnegie Mellon University
- Catholic University of America
- City College of New York
- Clark Atlanta University
- Clemson University
- College of William & Mary
- Colorado State University
- Columbia University
- Des Moines University
- Duke University
- East Carolina University
- East Tennessee State University
- Embry–Riddle Aeronautical University
- Emory University
- East Tennessee State University
- Florida A&M University
- Florida Atlantic University
- Florida Institute of Technology
- Florida International University
- Florida State University
- George Mason University
- George Washington University
- Georgia Institute of Technology
- Georgia State University
- Howard University
- Idaho State University
- Illinois Institute of Technology
- Indiana University
- Indiana University-Purdue University Indianapolis
- Iowa State University
- Jackson State University
- Johns Hopkins University
- Lehigh University
- Louisiana State University
- Meharry Medical College
- Mercer University
- Michigan State University
- Michigan Technological University
- Middle Tennessee State University
- Mississippi State University
- Missouri University of Science & Technology
- North Carolina A&T State University
- North Carolina State University
- Ohio State University
- Ohio University
- Oklahoma State University
- Oregon State University
- Pennsylvania State University
- Portland State University
- Purdue University
- Rice University
- Rutgers University
- Southern Illinois University Carbondale
- Southern Methodist University
- Southern University and A&M College
- Syracuse University
- Temple University
- Tennessee State University
- Tennessee Technological University
- Texas A&M University
- Texas Christian University
- Texas Tech University
- Tulane University
- Tuskegee University
- University of Alabama at Tuscaloosa
- University of Alabama at Birmingham
- University of Alabama in Huntsville
- University at Albany
- University of Arizona
- University of Arkansas
- University of Central Florida
- University of Cincinnati
- University of Colorado Boulder
- University of Colorado Denver
- University of Delaware
- University of Florida
- University of Georgia
- University of Houston
- University of Kentucky
- University of Louisiana at Lafayette
- University of Louisville
- University of Maryland, Baltimore County
- University of Maryland, College Park
- University of Massachusetts Lowell
- University of Memphis
- University of Miami
- University of Michigan
- University of Mississippi
- University of Missouri
- University of Nevada, Reno
- University of New Mexico
- University of North Carolina at Chapel Hill
- University of North Carolina at Charlotte
- University of North Texas
- University of Notre Dame
- University of Oklahoma
- University of Oklahoma Health Sciences Center
- University of Pittsburgh
- University of South Alabama
- University of South Carolina
- University of South Florida
- University of Southern Mississippi
- University of Tennessee
- University of Tennessee at Chattanooga
- University of Tennessee Health Science Center
- University of Texas at Arlington
- University of Texas at Austin
- University of Texas at Dallas
- University of Texas at San Antonio
- University of Toledo
- University of Tulsa
- University of Utah
- University of Virginia
- University of Wisconsin–Madison
- Utah State University
- Vanderbilt University
- Virginia Commonwealth University
- Virginia Polytechnic Institute and State University
- Wake Forest University
- Washington University in St. Louis
- Wayne State University
- Western Kentucky University
- Wichita State University
- Yale University

=== Associate members ===
- Appalachian State University
- Arkansas State University
- Berea College
- College of Charleston
- Eastern Kentucky University
- Fayetteville State University
- Jefferson University
- Johnson C. Smith University
- Lincoln Memorial University
- Marymount University
- Maryville College
- Mercyhurst University
- Navajo Technical University
- Oakland University
- South Carolina State University
- Spelman College
- Texas A&M University-Kingsville
- University of Arkansas for Medical Sciences
- University of Maryland, Eastern Shore
- University of Texas at El Paso
- University of Texas Permian Basin
- University of Texas Rio Grande Valley
- University of the District of Columbia
- University of West Georgia
- Villanova University
- Western Michigan University

== See also ==
- Advisory Committee on Human Radiation Experiments
- Atoms for Peace
- Oak Ridge Institute for Science and Education
