= Hugh Ross (astrophysicist) =

Canadian astrophysicist

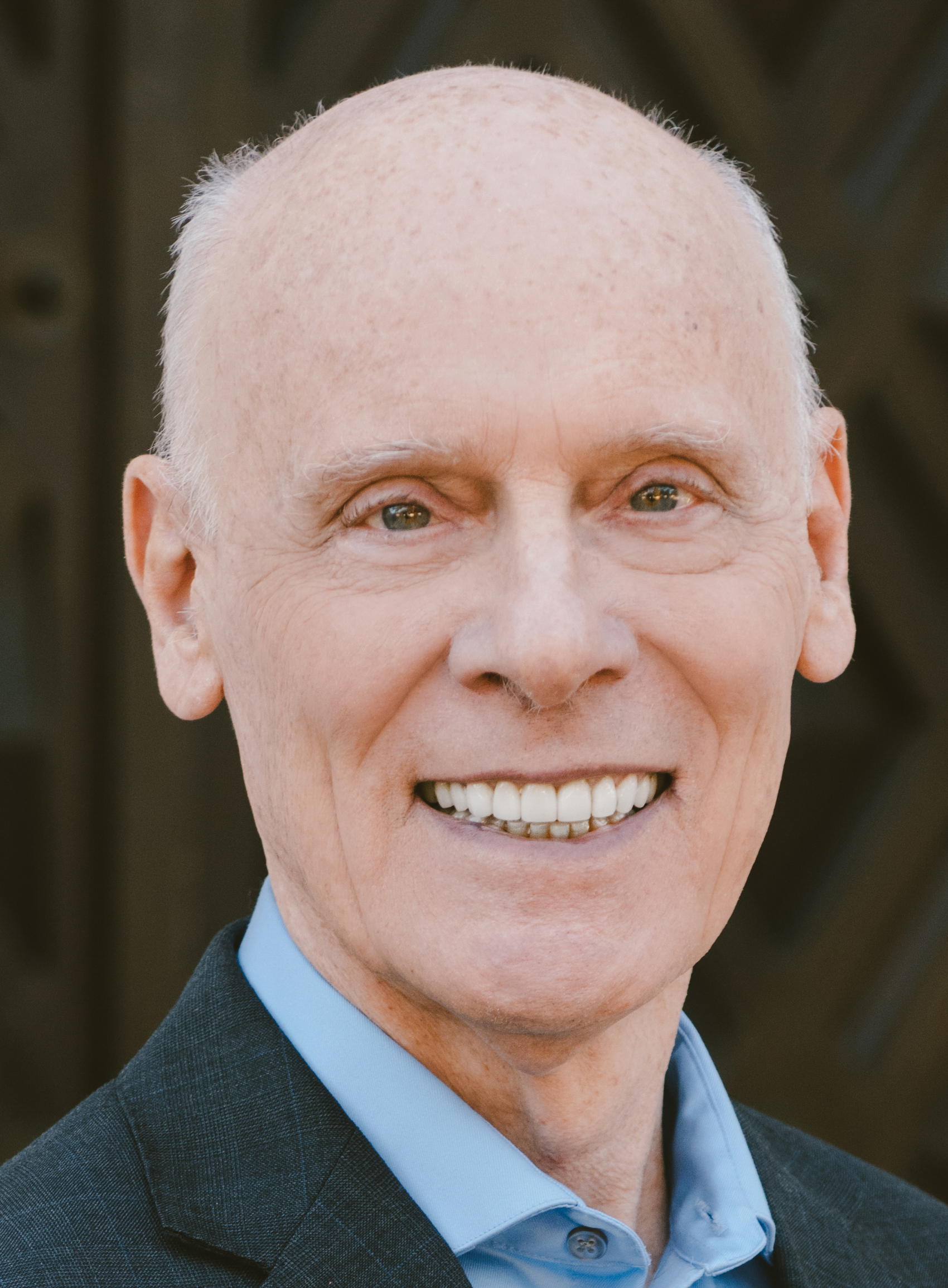
- Born: Hugh Norman Ross; July 24, 1945 (age 81); Montreal, Quebec, Canada
- Education: University of British Columbia (B.Sc.); University of Toronto (M.Sc., Ph.D.)
- Spouse: Kathy
- Children: 2
- Awards: Trotter Prize 2012
- Website: reasons.org

Hugh Norman Ross (born July 24, 1945) is a Canadian astrophysicist, Christian apologist, and old-Earth creationist.

Ross obtained his Ph.D. in astronomy from the University of Toronto and his B.Sc. degree in physics from the University of British Columbia. He established his own ministry in 1986, called Reasons to Believe.

Ross rejects both abiogenesis and evolution as explanations for the origin and entire history of life, contrary to the scientific consensus. Ross' position overlaps with that of intelligent design, but Ross argues that the evidence points to Jesus Christ as the designer, instead of an undefined intelligent designer.

== Early life and education ==
Hugh Ross was born in Montreal, Quebec, and raised in Vancouver, British Columbia, after moving there at the age of five. His parents were James Stewart Alexander Ross and Dorothy Isabel (Murray) Ross. He was interested in science from a young age, often reading science textbooks as a child.

As a teenager, Ross read works by philosophers such as Immanuel Kant and Rene Descartes, but felt their works contained inconsistencies and contradictions. Ross also read Eastern holy books from religions such as Hinduism, Buddhism, and Zoroastrianism. He began studying the Bible in secret due to his family's disapproval. He was inspired by the way the Bible described historical and scientific information, eventually becoming a Christian.

Ross described his upbringing as moral, but not religious. Ross became interested in astronomy at the age of seven, after asking his parents whether stars were hot when gazing up at the night sky. He visited the local library to find the answer. He soon became convinced that the expansion of the universe and the Big Bang required a divine "cosmic beginner". At 17 he began to serve as director of observations for Vancouver's Royal Astronomical Society and started examining religious texts.

Ross received a provincial scholarship and a National Research Council of Canada fellowship and earned a B.Sc. in physics from the University of British Columbia in 1967, going on to earn a M.Sc. in 1968, and a Ph.D. in astronomy from the University of Toronto in 1973. While in Toronto, Ross began meeting with his fellow Christian students to share their faith.

The National Research Council of Canada sent Ross to Caltech as a postdoctoral research fellow to study quasars and galaxies from 1973 to 1978. While at Caltech Ross met astronomer Dave Rogstad and joined his Bible study group, which included his future wife, Kathleen Ann Drake. The group encouraged him to spread his personal story about scientific evidence and Christianity.

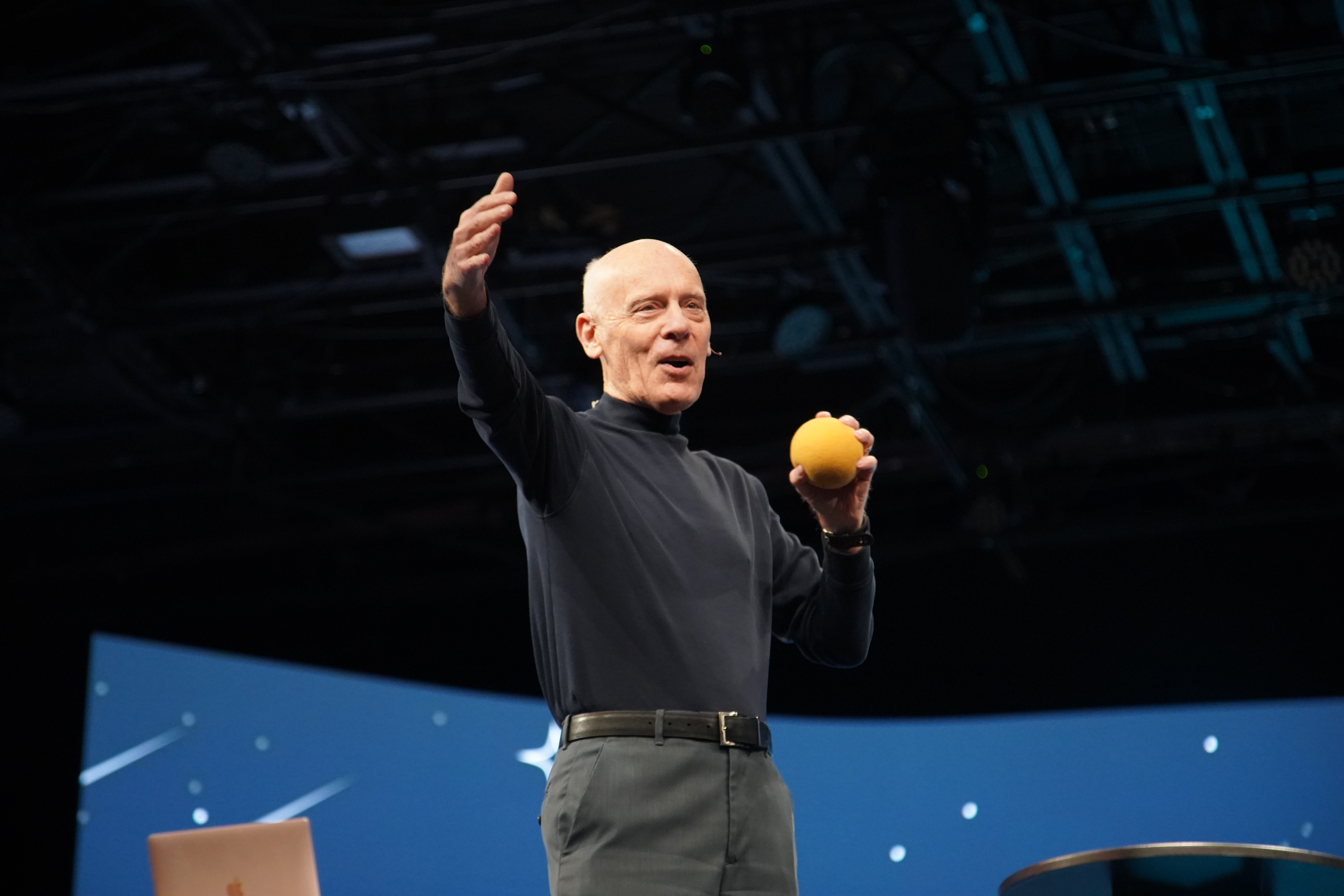
Ross presents at Grace Church St. Louis in November 2022

== Career ==
Ross served as a minister of evangelism at Sierra Madre Congregational Church. He was encouraged by leaders in his church to start his own ministry, and in 1986 he and Kathy Ross founded the apologetics ministry Reasons To Believe in Sierra Madre, California.

In 1989, Ross' first book on Christian apologetics was released, with sales exceeding a quarter million copies.

In 2012, Ross won the Trotter Prize, delivering the Trotter Lecture at Texas A&M University on "Theistic Implications for Big Bang Cosmology."

Ross has made radio and television appearances, and his work has been covered by news outlets including Christianity Today, The Houston Chronicle, The LA Times, The Washington Post, Fox News, and CBN.

In July 2022, Ross stepped down as CEO of Reasons to Believe to focus his efforts on research, writing and other endeavors.

== Beliefs ==
Ross believes God has revealed his existence and divine nature through both the Bible and creation. He also believes that his creation model is empirically testable, and equally plausible as the evolutionary model. Ross also believes that the Earth is fine-tuned for life, and that science and Christianity intersect rather than contradict each other. Ross believes that God has created the universe for several reasons and desires a relationship with humans.

Ross believes the record of nature is "like the 67th book of the Bible." He attempts to use science to find common ground with people, including secular scientists who reject the idea of God.

=== Old-Earth Creationism ===
Ross believes in progressive creationism, a view which holds that while the Earth is billions of years old, life did not appear by natural forces alone but that a supernatural agent formed different lifeforms in incremental (progressive) stages, and day-age creationism, a system of reconciling a literal Genesis account of creation with modern scientific theories on the age of the universe, the Earth, life, and humans. He rejects the young-Earth creationist positions that the earth is younger than 10,000 years and that the creation "days" of Genesis 1 represent 24-hour periods. Ross instead asserts that these days (translated from the Hebrew word yom) are historic, distinct, and sequential, but not 24 hours in length nor equal in length. Ross agrees with the scientific community that any version of intelligent design is inadequate if it does not provide a testable hypothesis which can make verifiable and falsifiable predictions, and if not, it should not be taught in the classroom as science.

Ross has critiqued young-Earth creationists, in particular Russell Humphreys, Ken Ham and Henry Morris. He was influential in chemistry Nobel Laureate Richard Smalley becoming a Christian and spoke at his funeral.

== Personal life ==
Ross married Kathy in 1977 and they have two sons.

Kathy was formerly the senior vice president of Reasons to Believe and oversaw the organization’s communications.

Ross has been diagnosed with Asperger syndrome.

== Bibliography ==
Ross has written or collaborated on the following books:

- The Fingerprint of God. Orange, Calif.: Promise Publishing, 1989, 2nd ed. 1991, 3rd ed. 2005 ISBN 978-0939497188
- The Creation Hypothesis, Downers Grove, IL: InterVarsity Press, 1994 ISBN 978-0830816989
- The Creator and the Cosmos. Colorado Springs: NavPress, 1993, 2nd ed. 1995, 3rd ed. 2001, 4th ed. 2018 ISBN 978-1886653146
- Creation and Time. Colorado Springs: NavPress, 1994 ISBN 978-0891097761
- Mere Creation, Downers Grove, IL: InterVarsity Press, 1998 ISBN 978-0830815159
- Beyond the Cosmos. Colorado Springs: NavPress, 1996, 2nd ed. 1999; Orlando, FL: Signalman Publishing, 2010, 3rd ed. ISBN 978-0984061488
- The Genesis Question, Colorado Springs: NavPress, 1998, 2nd ed. 2001 ISBN 978-1576831113
- The Genesis Debate, Mission Viejo, CA: Crux, 2002 (with five other authors) ISBN 978-0970224507
- Lights in the Sky and Little Green Men, Colorado Springs: NavPress, 2002 ISBN 978-1576832080
- A Matter of Days, Colorado Springs: NavPress, 2004 ISBN 978-1576833759
- Origins of Life, Colorado Springs: NavPress, 2004 (with Fazale Rana) ISBN 978-1576833445
- Who Was Adam? Colorado Springs, NavPress, 2005 (with Fazale Rana) ISBN 978-1576835777
- Creation as Science, Colorado Springs: NavPress, 2006 ISBN 978-1576835784
- Why the Universe is the Way it Is, Grand Rapids, MI: Baker Books, 2008 ISBN 978-0801071966
- More Than a Theory, Grand Rapids, MI: Baker Books, 2009 ISBN 978-0801014420
- Hidden Treasures in the Book of Job: How the Oldest Book of the Bible Answers Today's Scientific Questions, Grand Rapids: Baker Books, 2011 ISBN 978-0801072109
- Navigating Genesis: A Scientist's Journey through Genesis 1–11, 2014 ISBN 978-1886653863
- Improbable Planet: How Earth Became Humanity's Home, Grand Rapids: Baker Books, 2016 ISBN 9780801016899
- Always Be Ready: A Call To Adventurous Faith, Covina, CA: RTB Press, 2018 ISBN 978-1886653016
- Weathering Climate Change, Covina, CA: RTB Press, 2020 ISBN 978-1886653955
- Designed to the Core, Covina, CA: RTB Press, 2022 ISBN 978-1956112016
- Rescuing Inerrancy: A Scientific Defense, Covina, CA: RTB Press, 2023 ISBN 978-1956112030
- Noah's Flood Revisited: New Depths of Insight from Science and Scripture, Covina, CA: RTB Press, 2025 ISBN 978-1956112085

== Filmography ==
Title	Type	Year	Role
Praise	Self	1992-2013	Self
Earth: Young or Old?	TV miniseries	2000	Self
Journey Toward Creation	Video	2003	Self/Host
UFO Files	TV series	2004	Self
Ancient Secrets of the Bible	TV series	2007	Self
Dual Revelation	Film	2008	Self
Marcus & Joni	Self	2014	Self
The Land of The Lost Story (1999)	Film	2014	Self
Joni Table Talk	TV series	2015	Self
Four Blood Moons	Film	2015	Self
The Leon Show	TV series	2015	Self
The 700 Club	TV series	2019-2020	Self
The Hour of Power	TV series	2021	Self
Norm Geisler: Not Qualified	Film	2021	Self
Breath of Life	TV series	2022	Self
Universe Designed	Film	2025	Self

== See also ==
- Age of the Earth
- Anthropic principle
- Astronomy
- Biblical cosmology
- Cosmology
- Creator god
- Dating creation
- Fine-tuned universe
- Genesis creation narrative
- Timeline of cosmological epochs
