= Divine Action and Modern Science =

2002 book by Nicholas Saunders

- Author: Nicholas Saunders
- Publisher: Cambridge University Press
- Publication date: 2002

Divine Action and Modern Science (2002) is a book written by Nicholas Saunders. It looks at Near Eastern biblical and modern theological approaches to the idea of divine action, covering such questions as how divine action occurs, what its effects are, the relationship between divine and finite causation and complementarity versus mutual exclusivity. Saunders concludes that God is active in the physical world, but not as described by traditional accounts.

Through this book, Saunders differentiates between general and special divine action, with the former referring to the actions of God concerning the entirety of the natural order (initial creation and continual sustenance), and the latter pointing to the actions of God with regards to a particular time and place (such as a particular divine intervention or responses to prayer).

The author's categorical disagreement with current endeavors to bring together special divine action (SDA) with quantum assumptions and chaos theory is reflected in the book, saying that people are still remotely far from a reasonable hypothesis of divine action in a world that is consonant with contemporary science. Nonetheless, Saunders presumes that God exists and is currently active in the world in a specific sense setting off new fundamental interactions in nature. The book's writer further concedes that while people cannot ever seek to have inclusive comprehension of God's action within the world, this should not be a reason for anyone to go to the opposite extreme and assert that God's transcendence prohibits any evocative discussions of His actions.

== Key points ==
Essentially, Divine Action and Modern Science attempted to reconcile God and his actions with science. The book's main thesis is that Divine action should be considered an action upon and within nature. This being said, it is part of nature and, therefore, "the mechanics of describing such action, in some way, correlate with the mechanics of describing nature herself."

Saunders also drew from several theories on Divine Action such as those put forward by thinkers William Pollard, Nancey Murphy, and Thomas Tracy, among others. In his discourse, the author – through the evidence provided by these scholars – concluded that for each Divine action, there is a scientific feasibility.

Ultimately, the book claimed that a scientific explanation of the Divine action could revolutionize theological traditions, making it more relevant and tenable in light of our modern understanding of the natural sciences.

== Reviews ==
- Edward L. Schoen. International Journal for Philosophy of Religion, February 2005, volume 57, issue 1, pages 67–70.
- Michael Epperson. The Journal of Religion, October 2004 volume 84, issue 4 p648(2).
- Larry Chapp Modern Theology, October 2004, volume 20, issue 4, p. 613-615
- David Atkinson, "Words and works," Times Literary Supplement, January 9, 2004 issue 5258 p27(1).
- Arthur Peacocke, The Journal of Theological Studies, October 2003 volume 54, issue 2, pages 869–873.
- Religious Studies Review, Oct 2003 volume 29, page 353.
- V.V.Raman CHOICE: Current Reviews for Academic Libraries, Sept 2003, volume 41, issue 1 p169(1).
- Russell Stannard, Theology, July–August 2003, volume 106, Issue 832, pages 294–295.

== See also ==
- Scientific Perspectives on Divine Action
