= Henry Margenau =

German-American physicist (1901–1997)

- Henry Margenau
- Born: April 30, 1901; Bielefeld, German Empire
- Died: February 8, 1997 (aged 95); Hamden, Connecticut, U.S.
- Education: Midland College; University of Nebraska; Yale University
- Known for: Microwave theory, nuclear physics, philosophical foundations of physics
- Scientific career
- Fields: Physics, philosophy
- Workplaces: Yale University
- Theses: On the Zeeman-effect in the cerium spectrum between 3000 and 5000 Å (1926); Dependence of ultra-violet reflection of silver on plastic deformation (1929)
- Doctoral advisor: Louis Williams McKeehan
- Other academic advisors: Burton Evans Moore (M.Sc. advisor)
- Notable students: Murray Gell-Mann

Henry Margenau (April 30, 1901 – February 8, 1997) was a German-American physicist and philosopher of science.

== Biography ==
=== Early life ===
Born in Bielefeld, Germany, Margenau obtained his bachelor's degree from Midland Lutheran College, Nebraska before his M.Sc. from the University of Nebraska in 1926, and PhD from Yale University in 1929.

=== World War II ===
Margenau worked on the theory of microwaves and the development of duplexing systems that enabled a single radar antenna both to transmit and receive signals. He also worked on spectral line broadening, a technique used to analyse and review the dynamics of the atomic bombing of Hiroshima.

=== Philosophy and history of science ===
Margenau wrote extensively on science, his works including: Ethics and Science, The Nature of Physical Reality, Quantum Mechanics and Integrative Principles of Modern Thought. He wrote in 1954 the important introduction for the classic book of Hermann von Helmholtz, On the Sensations of Tone.

=== Free Will ===
In 1968, Margenau was invited to give the Wimmer Lecture at St. Vincent College in Latrobe, Pennsylvania. His topic was Scientific Indeterminism and Human Freedom. Margenau embraced indeterminism as the first step toward a solution of the problem of human freedom.

Then in 1982, Margenau called his two-stage model of free will a "solution" to what had heretofore had been seen as mere "paradox and illusion." He very neatly separates "free" and "will" in a temporal sequence, as William James had done, naming the two stages simply "chance" followed by "choice."

"Our thesis is that quantum mechanics leaves our body, our brain, at any moment in a state with numerous (because of its complexity we might say innumerable) possible futures, each with a predetermined probability. Freedom involves two components: chance (existence of a genuine set of alternatives) and choice. Quantum mechanics provides the chance, and we shall argue that only the mind can make the choice by selecting (not energetically enforcing) among the possible future courses."

=== Religious interests ===
Margenau served on a commission of the World Council of Churches in developing an ecumenical position on nuclear weapons and atomic warfare. However, his book The Miracle of Existence (Ox Bow Press, 1984) shows Margenau's broad interests not only in Christianity, but also in Eastern religions and his fascination with finding connections among different religious and philosophical traditions.

=== Post-war Yale ===
Margenau was appointed Eugene Higgins Professor of Physics and Natural Philosophy as Yale in 1950, a post he was to hold until his retirement from formal academic life in 1986. He also became a staff member at both the Institute for Advanced Study, Princeton and the MIT Radiation Laboratory. During his working career, he acted as consultant to the U.S. Air Force, the U.S. National Bureau of Standards, Argonne National Laboratory, Rand Corporation, General Electric Co. and Lockheed.

Margenau's work embraced investigation of intermolecular forces, spectroscopy, nuclear physics and electronics. He was also interested in parapsychology. He co-authored parapsychological papers with his friend Lawrence LeShan.

He was married to Liesel Noe and the couple parented two sons and a daughter. Margenau died in Hamden, Connecticut.

== Honours and awards ==
- Guggenheim Fellowship
- Fulbright Fellowship
- William Clyde DeVane Medal from the Yale chapter of Phi Beta Kappa for outstanding teaching and scholarship (1970).
- Laszlo & Sellon (eds) (1976). Vistas in Physical Reality: Papers in Honor of Henry Margenau. Plenum Press.

== Works ==
- Margenau, H. (1992). Cosmos, Bios, Theos: Scientists Reflect on Science, God, and the Origins of the Universe, Life, and Homo Sapiens. Open Court Publishing Company.

This book and Margenau each receive a mention in a December 28, 1992 Time magazine article: Galileo And Other Faithful Scientists

- Margenau, H. (1984). The Miracle of Existence. Ox Bow Press.
- LeShan, L. and Margenau, H. (1982). Einstein's Space and Van Gogh's Sky: Physical Reality and Beyond. Macmillan.
- Margenau, H. (1978). Physics and Philosophy: Selected Essays. D. Reidel Co.
- Lindsay, R. B.; Margenau, H. (1936). Foundations of Physics. J. Wiley & Sons.
- Margenau, H. (1950). The Nature of Physical Reality. McGraw Hill.
- Margenau, H. (1953). Physics: Principles and Applications. McGraw Hill.
- Margenau, H. (1961). Open Vistas: Philosophical Perspectives on Modern Science. Yale University Press.
- Margenau, H. (1964). The Scientist. TimeLife books.
- Margenau, H. (1958). Thomas and the Physics of 1958: A Confrontation. Marquette University Press.
- Margenau, H. Murphy, G. The Mathematics of Physics and Chemistry. 1943 1956

== See also ==
- Life Science Library
- List of science and religion scholars
