= Reasons to Believe =

American non-profit creationist organization

- Formation: 1986
- Founder: Hugh Ross
- Type: Religious ministry
- Legal status: Non-profit
- Purpose: "Revealing God in science"
- Headquarters: Covina, California, United States
- President: Fazale Rana
- Staff: 5 Scholars and 65 Staff
- Website: reasons.org

Reasons to Believe (RTB) is an American nonprofit organization that promotes day-age forms of old Earth creationism. It was founded in 1986 by Hugh Ross, a Canadian-born astrophysicist and creationist Christian apologist. Former Vice-President of Research and Apologetics, Fazale Rana, was named President and CEO in July 2022.

== About ==
Reasons to Believe aims to use science as a means of evangelism. The organization publishes articles, books, and audio programs about topics related to science and Christianity. It also produces video and multimedia content and hosts events where RTB speakers discuss science and apologetics.

The organization integrates science, theology, and philosophy to address topics such as the existence of God and the Bible’s reliability. Reasons to Believe is a member of the Evangelical Council of Financial Accountability and the Independent Charities of America.

RTB uses the words of 1 Peter 3:15-16 as the organization’s core values and ministry goal.

=== Reasons Institute ===
Through its Reasons Institute program, Reasons to Believe offers courses in science apologetics at educational institutions such as Biola University, Regent University, and Southern Evangelical Seminary.

=== RTB Press ===
Reasons to Believe founded RTB Press in 2013 to be an in-house publisher of books by RTB scholars. More than 25 books have been published through RTB Press. The organization previously published twelve books through Baker Publishing Group.

=== Scholars and Scholar Community ===
RTB has five in-house research scholars: Hugh Ross, Fazale Rana, Jeff Zweerink, Kenneth Samples and George Haraksin. RTB also organizes a scholar community with 350 members that studies various topics, including apologetics, earth sciences, and theology and participates in workshops organized by RTB.

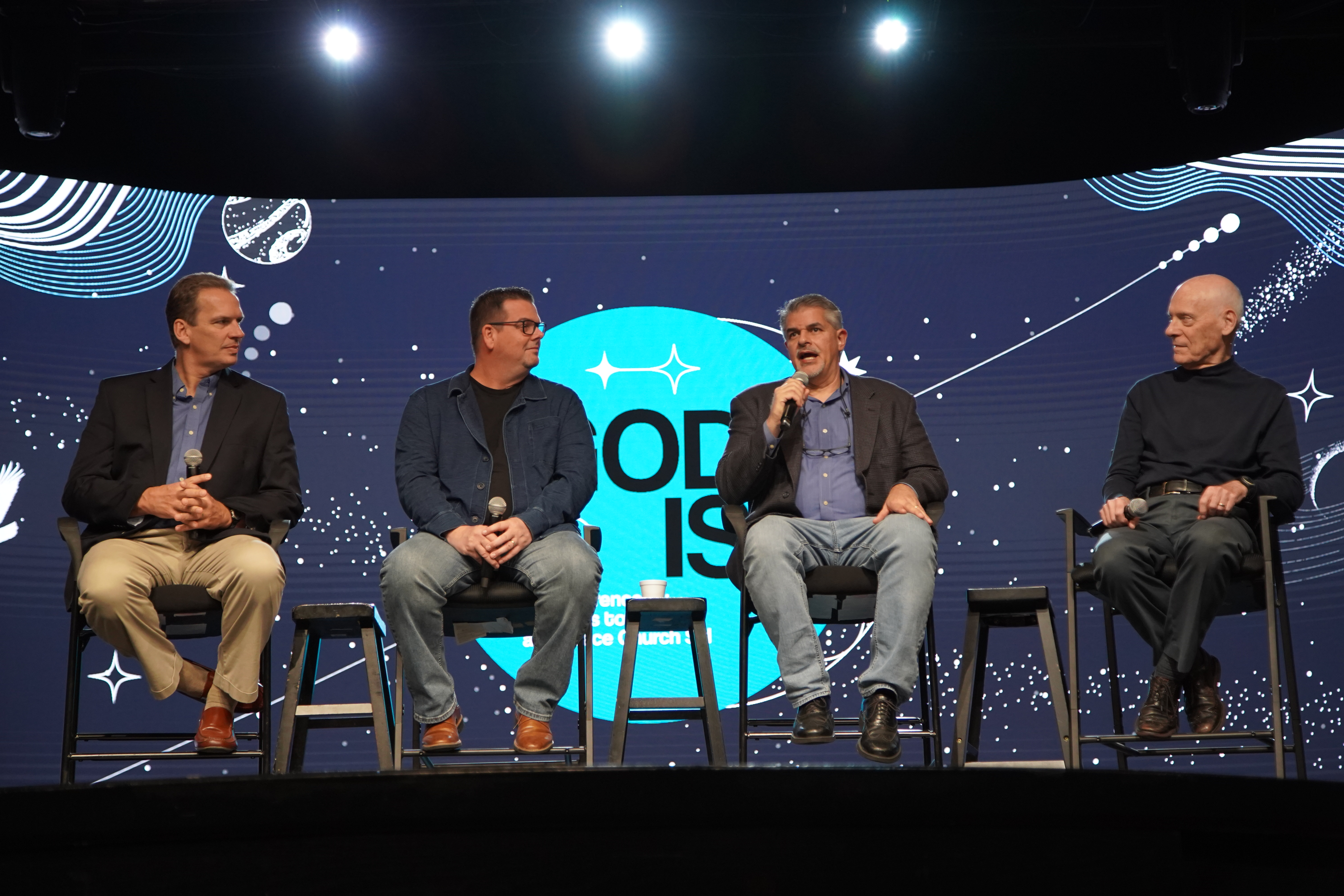
Reasons to Believe staff scholars Dr. Jeff Zweerink, George Haraksin, Fazale Rana and Hugh Ross speak during a conference at Grace Church St. Louis in November 2022

== Views ==
RTB offers a scientific model predicting an increase in astronomical evidence that Earth resides at the ideal location in the cosmos for both harboring advanced civilization and technology and making the universe observable. Nontheistic models predict that astronomical discoveries will show that Earth is unremarkable for both habitability and observation.

The RTB model predicts that future anthropological and genetic research will increasingly confirm that humans are biologically distinct rather than descended from a hominid species. It predicts stronger evidence for humanity's genetic, anatomical, and behavioral uniqueness. It places the earliest hominids (bipedal primates) at 6.5 million years ago and the first humans at around fifty thousand years ago.

RTB predicts that the flood of Noah was a local event. There is some evidence for a large flood in modern day Iraq around 2900 BCE.

== Awards ==
Reasons to Believe has been certified four times as a “Best Christian Workplace” for 2016, 2018, 2020 and 2022.

== Media ==
Reasons to Believe hosts, produces and distributes several podcasts and also has a Youtube channel.

== Criticism ==
Scientific models help researchers organize information into a conceptual structure to understand and interpret data, ask good questions, and identify anomalies. Famous scientific models include Albert Einstein’s theory of relativity and the neo-Darwinian theory of evolution. Writers such as Robert Pennock and Steven Novella have claimed RTB's testable creation model fails to meet the modern qualifications for a scientific theory or model and looks at known things and claims them as predictions.

In a review of an updated edition of Who Was Adam: A Creation Model Approach to the Origin of Humanity (2015) by Hugh Ross and Fazale Rana, research psychologist Brian Bolton argues against the scientific status of the RTB model. Bolton sees violations of scientific logic in the form of immunity to falsification, the assumption of supernatural causation, a lack of independent evaluations of evidence, circular reasoning, and the false equivalence of biblical creationism (faith-based) and human evolution (evidence-based) as scientific explanations.

RTB claims that all current humans are descended from a specially created couple that lived about 50,000 to 100,000 years ago, at the time of the explosion of music, art, and jewelry. They also believe there is no common ancestor between humans and other primates, which is disputed in a scholarly essay by evangelical geneticist Dennis Venema. There is strong genetic and fossil evidence suggesting a common ape-man ancestor as well.
