= John D. Caputo bibliography =

Bibliography of John D. Caputo's works

The following is a bibliography of John D. Caputo's works. Caputo (born October 26, 1940) is an American philosopher closely associated with postmodern Christianity.

== Books by Caputo ==
- (1978) The Mystical Element in Heidegger's Thought (Ohio University Press)
- (1982) Heidegger and Aquinas (Fordham University Press)
- (1986) The Mystical Element in Heidegger's Thought (Fordham University Press paperback with a new "Introduction")
- (1987) Radical Hermeneutics: Repetition, Deconstruction and the Hermeneutic Project (Indiana University Press)
- (1993) Against Ethics - Contributions to a Poetics of Obligation with Constant Reference to Deconstruction (Indiana University Press)
- (1993) Demythologizing Heidegger (Indiana University Press)
- (1997) The Prayers and Tears of Jacques Derrida (Indiana University Press)
- (1997) Deconstruction in a Nutshell: A Conversation with Jacques Derrida, ed./auth. (Fordham University Press)
- (2000) More Radical Hermeneutics: On Not Knowing Who We Are (Indiana University Press)
- (2001) On Religion (Routledge Press)
- (2006) Philosophy and Theology (Abingdon Press)
- (2006) The Weakness of God (Indiana University Press)
- (2007) After the Death of God, with Gianni Vattimo (Columbia University Press)
- (2007) How to Read Kierkegaard (Granta; Norton, 2008)
- (2007) What Would Jesus Deconstruct?: The Good News of Postmodernism for the Church (Baker Academic)
- (2013) The Insistence of God: A Theology of Perhaps (Indiana University Press)
- (2014) Truth (Penguin)
- (2015) Hoping Against Hope: Confessions of a Postmodern Pilgrim (Fortress Press)
- (2015) The Folly of God: A Theology of the Unconditional (Polebridge Press)
- (2017) Hoping Against Hope: Confessions of a Modern Pilgrim (Fortress Press)
- (2018) Hermeneutics: Facts and Interpretation in the Age of Information (Pelican)
- (2018) The Essential Caputo: Selected Writings, ed. Keith Putt (Indiana University Press)
- (2019) On Religion 2nd Edition (Routledge)
- (2019) Cross and Cosmos: A Theology of Difficult Glory (Indiana University Press)
- (2020) In Search of Radical Theology: Expositions, Explorations, Exhortations (Fordham University Press)
- (2021) The Collected Philosophical and Theological Papers, Volume 3 [1997-2000]: The Return of Religion, ed. Eric Weislogel (John D. Caputo Archives)
- (2022) The Collected Philosophical and Theological Papers, Volume 1 [1969-1985]: Aquinas, Eckhart, Heidegger: Metaphysics, Mysticism, Thought, ed. Eric Weislogel (John D. Caputo Archives)
- (2022) Specters of God: An Anatomy of Apophatic Imagination (Indiana University Press)
- (2022) The Collected Philosophical and Theological Papers, Volume 2 [1986-1996]: Hermeneutics and Deconstruction, ed. Eric Weislogel (John D. Caputo Archives)
- (2023) The Collected Philosophical and Theological Papers, Volume 4 [2001-2004]: Continental Philosophy of Religion, ed. Eric Weislogel (John D. Caputo Archives)
- (2023) What to Believe? Twelve Brief Lessons in Radical Theology (Columbia University Press)
- (2024) The Collected Philosophical and Theological Papers, Volume 5 [2005-2007]: Coming Out as a Theologian, ed. Eric Weislogel (John D. Caputo Archives)
- (2025) The Collected Philosophical and Theological Papers, Volume 6 [2008-2012]: Radical Theology, ed. Eric Weislogel (John D. Caputo Archives)
- (2026) The Collected Philosophical and Theological Papers, Volume 7 [2013-2023]: Theopoetics, ed. Eric Weislogel (John D. Caputo Archives)

== Books edited by Caputo ==
- (1992) Modernity and Its Discontents, ed. (Fordham University Press)
- (1993) Foucault and the Critique of Institutions, ed. (Pennsylvania State University Press)
- (1997) Deconstruction in a Nutshell: A Conversation with Jacques Derrida, ed./auth. (Fordham University Press)
- (1999) God, the Gift and Postmodernism, ed. (with Michael Scanlon) (Indiana University Press)
- (2001) The Religious, ed. (Blackwell)
- (2001) Questioning God: Religion and Postmodernism II, ed. (with Michael Scanlon) (Indiana University Press)
- (2004) Augustine and Postmodernism, ed. (with Michael Scanlon) (Indiana University Press)
- (2007) Transcendence and Beyond (with Michael Scanlon), ed. (Indiana University Press)
- (2009) St. Paul among the Philosophers (with Linda Alcoff), ed. (Indiana University Press)
- (2011) Feminism, Sexuality and Religion (with Linda Alcoff ), ed. (Indiana University Press)

== Books about Caputo ==
- (2021) Calvin D. Ullrich, Sovereignty and Event: The Political in John D. Caputo's Radical Theology (Tübingen, Mohr Siebeck)
- (2020) Zohar Mihaely, Sacred Anarchy: John Caputo and the Challenge of Religions Today (Resling, Tel Aviv)
- זהר מיכאלי, אנרכיה קדושה: ג'ון קאפוטו ואתגר הדתות כיום, תל אביב, רסלינג, 2020
- (2018) Štefan Štofanik, The Adventure of Weak Theology: Reading the Work of John D. Caputo through Biographies and Events (SUNY Press)
- (2015) Katharine Sarah Moody, Radical Theology and Emerging Christianity: Deconstruction, Materialism and Religious Practices (Ashgate)
- (2015) Elian Cuvillier, Ed., "John Caputo: Faiblesse de Dieu et déconstruction de la théologie," Special Issue of Études Théologiques et Religieuses, Volume 90 (No. 3): 2015.
- (2012) Phil Snider, Preaching After God: Derrida, Caputo, and the Language of Postmodern Homiletics (Wipf and Stock Publishers)
- (2010) Cross and Khora: Deconstruction and Christianity in the Work of John D. Caputo, eds. Neal Deroo and Marko Zlomsic (Wipf and Stock Press)
- (2009) Christopher Ben Simpson, Religion, Metaphysics and the Postmodern: William Desmond and John D. Caputo, (Indiana University Press)
- (2009) Ricardo Gil Soeiro, Grammatica da Esperança: Da Hermeneutica da Transcendencia à Hermeneutica Radical (Lisbon: Nova Vega)
- (2002) A Passion for the Impossible: John D. Caputo in Focus, ed. Mark Dooley (SUNY Press)
- (2002) Religion With/Out Religion: The Prayers and Tears of John D. Caputo, ed. James Olthuis (Routledge Press)
- (1997) The Very Idea of Radical Hermeneutics, ed. Roy Martinez (Humanities Press)

=== Interviews ===
- (2010) "John Caputo – Postmodernism and Religion," with Luke Muehlhauser, Common Sense Atheism, September 15, 2010 (www.commonsenseatheism.com)
- (2010) "John D. Caputo Returns," Homebrewed Christianity 82, July 2010 (www.homebrewedchristianity.com)
- (2009) "Good Soup and Other Gifts" in With Gifted Thinkers: Conversations With Caputo, Hart, Horner, Kearney, Keller, Rigby, Taylor, Wallace, Westphal (European University Studies: Series 23, Theology, Vol. 896), ed. Mark Manolopoulos (Bern, Berlin, Bruxelles, Frankfurt am Main, New York, Oxford, Vienna: Peter Lang Pub Inc., 2009), pp. 51–74.
- (2008) "A Theology of Our Desire: A Dialogue with John D. Caputo," Polygraph: An International Journal of Culture and Politics, 19/20 (2008): 159-175.
- (2008) "An Interview with John D. Caputo," Homebrewed Christianity (2008) on line at: https://trippfuller.com/?p=202
- (2007) "From Radical Hermeneutics to the Weakness of God: John D. Caputo in Dialogue with Mark Dooley," ed. Ian Leask, Philosophy Today, 51:2 (Summer, 2007): 216-26. Reprinted in: Cross and Khora: Deconstruction and Christianity in the Work of John D. Caputo, Eds. Neal Deroo and Marko Zlomsic (Eugene, OR: Pickwick Publications, Wipf and Stock Publishers, 2010), pp. 327–48.
- (2007) "On the Power of the Powerless," in Gianni Vattimo and John D. Caputo, After the Death of God, ed. Jeffrey Robbins (New York: Columbia University Press, 2007), 114-60
- (2005) "Emmet Cole Interviews John D. Caputo," The Modern World (May 16, 2005 ) (https://web.archive.org/web/20130115014457/http://themodernword.com/features/interview_caputo.html)
- (2004) "In Praise of Devilish Hermeneutics," in Thinking Otherwise: Critics in Conversation, ed. Julian Humphreys (New York: Fordham University Press, 2004), pp. 119–23.
- (2002) "Loosening Philosophy's Tongue: A Conversation with Jack Caputo," with Carl Raschke, Journal of Cultural and Religious Theory, Vol. 3, No. 2 (April, 2002). An on line journal: www.jcrt.org.
- (2001) "What Do I Love When I Love My God?: An Interview with John D. Caputo," with Keith Putt, in Religion With/out Religion: The Prayers and Tears of John D. Caputo, ed. James H. Olthuis (London and New York: Routledge, 2001), pp. 150–179.

== Journal articles and book chapters ==
=== 2020 ===
- "Gadamer and the Postmodern Mind," in The Gadamerian Mind, ed. Theodore George and Gert-Jan van der Heidne (a Routledge series Philosophical Minds).

=== 2019 ===
- "L'existance de Dieu: réconcilier le monde avec Dieu," trans. Pascale Renaud-Grosbras, Études Théologiques et Religieuses, Vol. 94, No. 1 (2019): 37-54. (Translation of Cross and Cosmos, pp. 127–39).
- "The Theopoetic Reduction: Suspending the Supernatural Signified," Literature and Theology, Ed. Heather Walton (Oxford: Oxford University Press, forthcoming 2019).
- "Tradition and Event: Radicalizing the Catholic Principle," in The Challenge of God: Continental Philosophy and the Catholic Intellectual Tradition, Eds. Colby Dickinson, Hugh Miller and Kathleen McNutt (London: Bloomsbury, 2019), 99-113.
- "Continental Philosophy and American Catholics: Then, Now, and Tomorrow," in The Catholic Reception of Continental Philosophy in North America, eds. Gregory P. Floyd and Stephanie Rumpza (Toronto: University of Toronto Press, 2019), 90-113.
- "Ontological Difference," in 50 Concepts for a Critical Phenomenology, Eds. Gail Weiss, Gayle Salamon, Ann Murphy (Evanston: Northwestern University Press, 2019).
- "A Response to Professor Risser," Duquesne Journal of Phenomenology.
- "Violence and the Unconditional: A Radical Theology of Culture," in Journal for Continental Philosophy of Religion, eds. Jason Wesley Alvis and Jeffrey Robbins, I (2019), 170-90.
- "The Subjunctive Power of God," Concilium, special issue "Politics, Theology and the Meaning of Power." ed. Joao Vila-Cha.

=== 2018 ===
- "Afterword: An Ear for My Voice," in Stefan Stofanik, The Adventures of Weak Theology (SUNY Press), eds. Joeri Schrijvers and Lieven Boeve.
- "Interpretation All the Way Down: Encountering the Unconditional," Legacy: The Magazine of The National Association for Interpretation, 29:5 (September–October, 2018): 21-3.
- "Theology in Trumptime: The Insistence of America" in Doing Theology in the Age of Trump: A Critical Report on Christian Nationalism, eds. Clayton Crockett and Jeffrey Robbins, Westar Seminar on God and the Human Future (Eugene, OR: Cascade Books, 2018), 77-81.
- "The Seminar on God and the Human Future: A Report on the 2018 Meeting," The Fourth R, Vol. 31, No. 4 (July–August 2018): 17-22.
- "Theology, Poetry and Theopoetics," in The Art of Anatheism, eds. Richard Kearney and Matthew Clemente (London & New York: Rowman Littlefield, 2018), 43-48.
- "From Sacred Anarchy to Political Theology: An Interview with John D. Caputo" (by Clayton Crockett) in The Essential Caputo, ed. B. Keith Putt (Bloomington: Indiana University Press, 2018), 18-43.
- "Radical Theologians, Knights of Faith, and the Future of the Philosophy of Religion," in Reconfigurations of the Philosophy of Religion, ed. Jim Kanaris (Albany: SUNY Press, 2018), 211-36.

=== 2017 ===
- "If There Is Such a Thing: Posse ipsum, the Impossible, and le peut-être même: Reading Catherine Keller's Cloud of the Impossible" Journal of Cultural and Religious Studies, 17:1 (December, 2017). https://www.jcrt.org/archives/17.1/Caputo.pdf
- "John D. Caputo" (Interview by George Yancy in George Yancy, On Race: 34 Conversations in a Time of Crisis (Oxford: Oxford University Press, 2017), 73-80.
- "La Faiblesse de Dieu: Une Théologie radicale à partir de Paul," La Sagesse et la folie de Dieu: Lectures exégé tiques et théologiques de 1 Corinthiens 1-2, eds. Christopher Chalamet and Hans-Christophe Askani eds.(Geneva: Laboret Fides, 2017), 33-74; translation of "The Weakness of God: A Radical Theology of the Cross," in The Wisdom and Foolishness of God: First Corinthians 1-2 in Theological Exploration, Chalamet, Christophe and Askani, Hans-Christoph, eds. (Minneapolis: Fortress Press, 2015), 25-79.
- "Marcel and Derrida: Christian Existentialism and the Genesis of Deconstruction," in Living Existentialism: Essays in Honor of Thomas W. Busch, eds. Joseph C. Berendzen and Gregory Hoskins (Eugene, OR: Pickwick Publications, 2017), 3-23.

=== 2016 ===
- "The Rose is Without Why: The Later Heidegger," Philosophy Today, 15 (1971), 3-15. Chinese Trans. Wu sanxi in Journal for the Study of Christian Culture (June, 2016) (ISBN 9787801233653.）
- Caputo, John D. (3 May 2016). "Hoping Against Hope: The Possibility of the Impossible". Journal of Pastoral Theology. 26 (2): 91–101. doi:10.1080/10649867.2016.1244325. S2CID 157114155.
- "Devilish Hermeneutics, The Temptations of Jesus and Radical Theology," in Anfechtung: Versuch der Entmarginalisierung einers Klassikers, Eds. Pierre Bühler, Stefan Berg, Andreas Hunziger and Harmut von Sass, "Hermeneutische Untersuchungen zur Theologie," No. 71 (Tübingen: Mohr Siebeck: 2016), 191-208
- "'Let it Blaze, Let it Blaze:' Pyrotheology and the Theology of the Event," Modern Believing, 57:4 (2016): 335-48.
- "A Short Précis of The Weakness of God and The Insistence of God," Forum: Foundations and Facets, 5:2 (Fall, 2016): 107-18.
- "Religion and Deconstruction," in Talking God: Philosophers on Belief, ed. Gary Gutting (New York: W. W. Norton, 2016), 38-54.
- "Teaching the Event: Deconstruction, Hauntology, and the Scene of Pedagogy," in Eamonn Dunne and Aidan Seery (eds.), Pedagogics of Unlearning (Punctum Press), 109-28.
- "Anatheism and Radical Hermeneutics," in Reimagining the Sacred, eds. Richard Kearney and Jens Zimmerman (New York: Columbia University Press, 2016), 193-218.
- "The Insistence of Religion in Philosophy: An Interview by John Caruana and Mark Cauchi," in Symposium: Canadian Journal of Continental Philosophy, 20:1 (Spring, 2016): 11-32. Special topic: "Varieties of Continental Philosophy and Religion"

=== 2015 ===
- "Forget Rationality—Is There Religious Truth"? in Madness, Religion and the Limits of Reason, eds. Jonna Bornemark and Sven-Olov Wallenstein, Södertörn Philosophical Studies 16 (Stockholm, Sweden: Elendars, 2015), 23-40.
- "Theology, Poetry and Theopoetics," Foreword to Luis Cruz-Villalobos, Poesia, Teologia (Santiago de Chile: Hebel, Ediciones Colección Arte-Sana, 2015).
- "The Weakness of God: A Radical Theology of the Cross," in The Wisdom and Foolishness of God: First Corinthians 1-2 in Theological Exploration, Chalamet, Christophe and Askani, Hans-Christoph, eds. (Minneapolis: Fortress Press, 2015), 25-79.
- "Unprotected Religion: Radical Theology, Radical Atheism, and the Return of Anti- Religion," in The Trace of God: Derrida and Religion, (Eds.) Peter E. Gordon and Edward Baring (New York: Fordham University Press, 2015), 151-77.
- "Foreword" to Claudia Ruitenberg, Unlocking the World: Education in an Ethics of Hospitality (Bolder: Paradigm Publishers, 2015), vi xiii.
- "Proclaiming the Year of the Jubilee: Thoughts on a Spectral Life," in It Spooks: Living in Response to an Unheard Call, ed. Erin Schendzielos (Rapid City, S.D., Shelter50 Publishing Collective, 2015), pp. 10–47.

=== 2014 ===
- "Theopoetics as a Heretical Hegelianism," Cross Currents, 64: 4 (December,2014): 509-34.
- "Derrida and the Trace of Religion," in A Companion to Derrida (Blackwell Companions to Philosophy) ed. Leonard Lawlor and Zeynep Direk (Wiley-Blackwell), 464-79.
- "Preface: The Audacity of God" to (Spanish translation of The Weakness of God).
- "Like a Devilish Knight of Faith," The Oxford Literary Review 36.2 (2014): 188–190.
- "The Wisdom of Hermeneutics," Foreword to Conducting Hermeneutic Research: From Philosophy to Practice (eds.) Moules, N.J., McCaffrey, G., et al. (Peter Lang, 2014)
- "Is Continental Philosophy of Religion Dead?," in The Future of Continental Philosophy of Religion, eds. Clayton Crockett, B. Keith Putt, and Jeffrey W. Robbins (Bloomington: Indiana University Press, 2014), 21-33.
- "The Invention of Revelation: A Hybrid Hegelian Approach with a Dash of Deconstruction," in Revelation: Claremont Studies in the Philosophy of Religion, Conference 2012, (eds.) I.U. Dalferth and M.Ch. Rodgers (Tübingen: Mohr Siebeck, 2014), 73-92.

=== 2013 ===
- "Review: Jean-Luc Marion, In the Self's Place: The Approach of St. Augustine, Jeffrey L. Kosky (tr.), Stanford University Press, 2012 in Notre Dame Philosophical Reviews (Jan 8, 2013). https://ndpr.nd.edu/news/in-the-self-s-place-the-approach-of-st-augustine/
- "Spectral Hermeneutics" (from After the Death of God), Polish translation, in Drzewo Poznania: Postsekularyzm w prezekfadach in komentarzach, eds. Piotr Bogaleckiego and Aliny Miyek-Dziemby (Katowicach: Uniwersytet Slaski w Katwowicach, 2012), 121-62.
- "Radical Theology as Theopoetics," in Theopoetic Folds: Philosophizing Multifariousness, eds. Roland Faber and Jeremy Fackenthal (New York: Fordham University Press, 2013), 125-41.
- "Outside the Box," Foreword to Peter Blum, For a Church to Come: Experiments in Postmodern Theory and Anabaptist Thought (Harrisonburg, VA: Herald Press, 2013), 9-14.

=== 2012 ===
- "Education as Event: A Conversation with John D. Caputo," with T. Wilson Dickinson, Journal of Culture and Religious Theory, 12:2 (Fall, 2012): 25-46. Special Issue: Pedagogical Theory and Special Practices. https://www.jcrt.org
- "The Weakness of the Flesh: Overcoming the Soft Gnosticism of Incarnational Christianity," in Intensities: Philosophy, Religion and the Affirmation of Life, eds. Steven Shakespeare and Katharine Sarah Moody (Surrey, England: Ashgate, 2012), 79-94.
- "Teaching the Event: Deconstruction, Hauntology and the Scene of Pedagogy," in Philosophy of Education, 2012: 23-34, ed. Claudia W. Ruitenberg (2012 Kneller Lecture, Pittsburgh, March 24, 2012) http://ojs.ed.uiuc.edu/index.php/pes/article/view/3597
- "On Not Settling for an Abridged Edition of Postmodernism: Radical Hermeneutics as Radical Theology," in Reexamining Deconstruction and Determinate Religion: Toward a Religion with Religion), eds. J. Aaron Simmons and Stephen Minister (Pittsburgh: Duquesne University Press, 2012), 271-353.
- "Dieu, peut-être, Esquisse d'un Dieu à venir et d'une nouvelle espèce de théologiens," trans. Corine Laidet, in Les Temps Modernes, Nos. 669-70 (Juillet-Octobre, 2012): 274-88. ("Derrida, L'événement, Déconstruction," ed. Joseph Cohen).
- Caputo, John D. (2012). "Continental Philosophy of Religion: Then, Now, and Tomorrow (extended version)". The Journal of Speculative Philosophy. 26 (2): e–1. Project MUSE 486324.
- Caputo, John D. (2012). "Continental Philosophy of Religion: Then, Now, and Tomorrow (extended version)". The Journal of Speculative Philosophy. 26 (2): e–1. Project MUSE 486324.
- "Foreword," The William Desmond Reader, ed. Christopher Ben Simpson (Albany: SUNY Press, 2012), vii-x.
- Book Review: Christopher Watkin, Difficult Atheism: Post-Theological Thinking in Alain Badiou, Jean-Luc Nancy and Quentin Meillassoux in Notre Dame Philosophical Reviews, June 10, 2012. https://ndpr.nd.edu/news/31269-difficult-atheism-post-theological-thinking-in-alain-badiou-jean-luc-nancy-and-quentin-meillassoux/
- "Voir Venir: How Far Plasticity Can Be Stretched," in theory@buffalo, vol. 16 (2012), Special issue on "Plastique: The Dynamics of Catherine Malabou"): 107-123.
- "Augustine and Postmodernism," A Companion to Augustine, ed. Mark Vessey (Oxford: Wiley-Blackwell Publishing, 2012), 492-504.
- "Heidegger's Philosophy of Science," in Heidegger on Science, ed. Trish Glazebrook (Albany: SUNY Press, 2012), 261-80 [Reprinted from Rationality, Relativism and the Human Sciences, ed. Joseph Margolis (The Hague: Nijhoff, 1986), pp. 43–60].

=== 2011 ===
- "The Promise of the World," Transfiguration: Nordic Journal of Christianity and the Arts (Museum Tusclanum: University of Copenhagen), Vol. 10 (2010/11): 13-32.
- "God, Perhaps: The Dialectical Hermeneutics of God in the Work of Richard Kearney," Philosophy Today (Selected Studies in Phenomenology and Existential Philosophy, Vol 36) Vol 55 (SPEP Supplement, 2011):56-64. https://doi.org/10.5840/philtoday201155Supplement8
- "Hospitality and the Trouble with God," in Phenomenologies of the Stranger: Between Hostility and Hospitality, eds. Richard Kearney and Kascha Semonovitch (New York: Fordham University Press, 2011), 83-97.
- "The Return of Anti-Religion: From Radical Atheism to Radical Theology," Journal of Cultural and Religious Theory, Vol. 11, no. 2 (Spring, 2011), 32-125. (https://www.jcrt.org/archives/11.2/caputo.pdf)
- "The Perversity of the Absolute, the Perverse Core of Hegel, and the Possibility of Radical Theology," in Hegel and the Infinite: Religion, Politics, and Dialectic, eds. Clayton Crockett, Creston Davis and Slavoj Zizek (New York: Columbia University Press, 2011), 47-66.

=== 2010 ===
- "Continental Philosophy of Religion," in A Companion to Philosophy of Religion, 2nd edition, eds. Paul Draper, Charles Taliaferro and Philip Quinn (Oxford: Wiley-Blackwell, 2010), pp. 667–73.
- "The Sense of God: A Theology of the Event with Special Reference to Christianity," in Between Philosophy and Theology: Contemporary Interpretations of Christianity, eds. Lieven Boeve and Christophe Brabrant (Surrey, Eng.: Ashgate, 2010), 27-42.
- "The Gap God Opens," Tikkun (Vol. 25, No. 2: March–April, 2010): 41
- "Praying for an Earthier Jesus: A Theology of Flesh," in I More Than Others: Responses to Evil and Suffering, ed. Eric R. Serverance (Newcastle, UK: Cambridge Scholars Publishing, 2010), pp. 6–27.
- "Virtually Invisible: On Seeing in the Dark," in On Race and Racism in America: Confessions in Philosophy, ed. Roy Martinez (University Park: Pennsylvania State University Press, 2010), pp. 3–28.
- "The Weakness of God and the Iconic Logic of the Cross," in Cross and Chora: Deconstruction and Christianity in the Work of John D. Caputo, Eds. Neal Deroo and Marko Zlomsic (Eugene, OR: Pickwick Publications, Wipf and Stock Publishers, 2010), pp. 15–36.

=== 2009 ===
- "Good Soup and Other Gifts" [Interview] in With Gifted Thinkers: Conversations With Caputo, Hart, Horner, Kearney, Keller, Rigby, Taylor, Wallace, Westphal (European University Studies: Series 23, Theology, Vol. 896), ed. Mark Manolopoulos (Bern, Berlin, Bruxelles, Frankfurt am Main, New York, Oxford, Vienna: Peter Lang Pub Inc., 2009).
- "Bodies Still Unrisen, Events Still Unsaid: A Hermeneutic of Bodies without Flesh," Apophatic Bodies:Negative Theology, Incarnation, and Relationality, eds. Chris Boesel and Catherine Keller (Fordham University Press, 2009), 94-116; previously published in Angelaki: Journal of Theoretical Humanities, Vol. 12, No. 1 (April 2007): 73-86.
- Review: Slavoj Zizek and John Milbank, The Monstrosity of Christ: Paradox or Dialectic?, Creston Davis (ed.), MIT Press, 2009. Notre Dame Philosophical Review, 2009.09.33:http://ndpr.nd.edu/review.cfm?id=17605
- "What is Merold Westphal's Critique of Onto-theology Criticizing?" in Gazing through a Prism Darkly: Reflections on Merold Westphal's Hermeneutical Epistemology, ed. B. Keith Putt (New York: Fordham University Press, 2009), 100-15.
- Review: Mark Taylor, After God, in Journal of the American Academy of Religion, 77 (March, 2009): 162-65.

=== 2008 ===
- "Oltre la sovranità: molte nazioni, sotto un Dio debole," Iride: Filosofia e discussione pubblica (Società editrice il Mulino, Italy): Vol. 21, No. 54 (August, 2008): 323-336. Italian translation of: "Beyond Sovereignty: Many Nations Under the Weakness of God," Soundings: An Interdisciplinary Journal, 89.1-2 (Spring-Summer, 2006): 21-35.
- "Listening to the Voices of the Dead: The Heterological Historian in Gill and Wyschogrod," in Saintly Influence: Texts for Edith Wyschogrod, ed. Eric Boynton and Martin Kravka (New York: Fordham University Press, 2008), 161-74.
- "On the Wings of Angels: Post-humanism and Info-technotheology," Proceedings of the Simon Silverman Symposium (Duquesne University, 2008)
- "Why the Church Deserves Deconstruction: A Preface to the Chinese Translation [of What Would Jesus Deconstruct?] http://churchandpomo.typepad.com/conversation/2008/12/preface-to-the-chinese-edition-of-wwjd.html
- "In His Steps: A Postmodern Edition" Excerpt from Chapter 1 of What Would Jesus Deconstruct? in Global Spiral, Feb. 6, 2008, electronic journal published by the Metanexus Institute (www.metanexus.net )
- "Having Faith in Reason: A Response to Professor Wiebe," The Council of Societies for the Study of Religion Bulletin, Vol. 33, No. 2 (September, 2008): 85-86.
- "Open Theology Or What Comes After Secularism?" The Council of Societies for the Study of Religion Bulletin, Vol. 37, No. 2 (April, 2008): 45-49.

=== 2007 ===
- "Atheism, A/theology and the Postmodern Condition," in The Cambridge Companion to Atheism, ed. Michael Martin (Cambridge: Cambridge University Press, 2007), pp. 267–82.
- "Bodies Still Unrisen, Events Still Unsaid," Angelaki: Journal of Theoretical Humanities, 12:1 (April, 2007): 73-86.
- "The Hyperbolization of Phenomenology: Two Possibilities for Religion in Recent Continental Philosophy," Counter-Experiences: Reading Jean-Luc Marion, ed. Kevin Hart (Notre Dame: University of Notre Dame Press, 2007), pp. 66–93.
- "The Weakness of God: A Theology of the Event" in The Mourning After: Attending the Wake of Postmodernism, eds. Neil Brooks and Josh Toth, Postmodern Studies 40 (Amsterdam - New York: Rodopi, 2007), pp. 285–302.
- "Theopoetic/Theopolitic" (with Catherine Keller), Cross-Currents, 56:4 (Winter, 2006-7.
- "Avant la création: le souvenir de dieu de Derrida," trans. Patrick Dimascio, in Derrida pour les temps à venir, ed. René Major (Paris: Editions Stock, 2007), 140-58. [Translation of "Before Creation: Derrida's Memory of God," Mosaic: A Journal for the Interdisciplinary Study of Literature, 39:3 (September, 2006): 91-102.]
- "Die Tränen und Gebete einer diabolishen Hermeneutic: Derrida und Meister Eckhart," trans.Jochen Schmidt, in Dem Geheimnis auf der Spur, ed. Susanne Klinger und Jochen Schmidt (Leipzig: Evangelische Verlagsanstalt, 2007), 125-46. Translation of ch. 10 of More Radical Hermeneutics.
- "Temporal Transcendence: The Very Idea of à venir in Derrida," in Transcendence and Beyond, eds. John D. Caputo and Michael Scanlon (Bloomington: Indiana University Press, 2007), 188-203.
- "From Radical Hermeneutics to the Weakness of God: John D. Caputo in Dialogue with Mark Dooley," ed. Ian Leask, Philosophy Today, 51:2 (Summer, 2007): 216-26.
- "Richard Rorty (1931-2007): In Memoriam," Cross Currents, 57, No. 3 (Fall, 2007): 434-38 and on-line at The Global Spiral (A Publication of the Metanexus Institute) 8:5 (August, 2007)available at http://www.metanexus.net/magazine/tabid/68/id/10108/Default.aspx
- Review: Jean-Luc Marion, The Erotic Phenomenon in: Ethics, vol. 118 (October, 2007).

=== 2006 ===
- "From Radical Hermeneuticss to the Weakness of God: An Interview with John D. Caputo, Conducted by Mark Dooley," Oregon Extension Journal (Ashland, OR), Vol. 8 (Fall, 2006): 5-10.
- "On Being Clear about Faith: A Response to Stephen Williams," Books and Culture: A Christian Review, Vol. 12, No. 6 (November/December, 2006): 40-42.
- "Without Sovereignty, Without Being: Unconditionally, the Coming God and Derrida's Democracy to Come," in Religion and Violence in a Secular World, ed. Clayton Crockett (Charlottesville: University of Virginia Press, 2006), pp. 137–56.
- "Beyond Sovereignty: Many Nations Under the Weakness of God," Soundings: An Interdisciplinary Journal, 89.1-2 (Spring-Summer, 2006): 21-35.
- "Before Creation: Derrida's Memory of God," Mosaic: A Journal for the Interdisciplinary Study of Literature, 39:3 (September, 2006): 91-102.
- Hauntological Hermeneutics and the Interpretation of Christian Faith: On Being Dead Equal Before God," Hermeneutics at the Crossroads, ed. Kevin Vanhoozer, James K. A. Smith and Bruce Ellis Benson (Bloomington: Indiana University Press, 2006), pp.95-111.
- "Looking the Impossible in the Eye: Kierkegaard, Derrida, and the Repetition of Religion," Chinese Translation by Wang Qi in World Philosophy, Vol. 21, No. 3 (2006): 4-21 [English original in Kierkegaard Studies Yearbook 2002, ed. Niels Cappelorn (Berlin: Walter de Gruyter, 2002), pp. 1–25.]
- "The Prayers and Tears of Jacques Derrida" and "Laughing, Praying, Weeping before God: A Response [to the papers of David Wood, Edith Wyschogrod and Francis Ambrosio]" in S. Clark Buckler and Matthew Statler, Styles of Piety: Practicing Philosophy after the Death of God (New York: Fordham University Press, 2006), pp. 193–204 and 253-69.
- "Richard Kearney's Enthusiasm," in After God: Richard Kearney and the Religious Turn in Continental Philosophy, ed. John Manoussakis (New York: Fordham University Press, 2006), pp. 309–19.
- "Jacques Derrida (1930-2004)," Cross Currents, Vol. 55, No. 4 (Winter, 2006): 564-67.
- "Methodological Postmodernism: On Merold Westphal's "Overcoming Onto-Theology," Faith and Philosophy, 22, No. 3 (July, 2005): 284-96.

=== 2005 ===
- "Against Ethics," in The Sheed & Ward Anthology of Catholic Philosophy, eds. James C. Swindal and Harry J. Gentler, S.J. (Langham, MD: Rowman & Littlefield, A Sheed and Ward Book, 2005), pp. 510–22. Reprint, excerpted from "Reason, History and a Little Madness: Towards an Ethics of the Kingdom," in Questioning Ethics: Contemporary Debates in Philosophy, ed. Richard Kearney and Mark Dooley. New York: Routledge, 1999
- "Jacques Derrida and the Future of Religion" accompanied by a Portuguese translation: "Jacques Derrida e o Futuro da Religião," trans. Jaci Maraschino, Margens: Revista da Associação Brasileira de Estudos sobre Pós-modernidade, Vol. 1, No. 2 (2005) (www.margens.org.br.)
- "In Praise of Ambiguity," in Ambiguity in the Western Mind, eds. Craig J. N. De Paulo (New York: Lang Pub. Co., 2005), pp. 15–34.
- "Hyperbolic Justice: Deconstruction, Myth and Politics," in Emmanuel Levinas: Critical Assessments, ed. Claire Elise Katz with Lara Trout (New York and London: Routledge, 2005), vol. 4, pp. 67–84; reprinted from Research in Phenomenology 21 (1991): 3-20.
- "The Experience of God and the Axiology of the Impossible," in The Experience of God: A Postmodern Response, eds. Kevin Hart and Barbara E. Wall (New York: Fordham University Press, 2005), pp. 20–41.
- "Foreword: Of Hyper-Realty," in Ewan Ferne, Spiritual Shakespeares (New York and London: Routledge, 2005), pp. xiii-xv.
- "Emmet Cole Interviews John D. Caputo," The Modern World (May, 2005) (https://web.archive.org/web/20130115014457/http://themodernword.com/features/interview_caputo.html)
- "Hauntological Hermeneutics and the Interpretation of Christian Faith: On Being Dead Equal Before God," American Catholic Philosophical Quarterly, 79, 2 (2005): 291-311.
- "Filosofia e Posmodernismo Profetico," Revista Portuguesa de Filosofia, 60, No. 4 (2004): 827-43 [Portuguese translation of "Philosophy and Prophetic Postmodernism: Toward a Catholic Postmodernity," American Catholic Philosophical Quarterly, 74: 4 (Autumn, 2000): 549-568.
- "Jacques Derrida (1930-2004)," Journal of Cultural and Religious Studies, 6:1 (December, 2004) (https://www.jcrt.org/archives/06.1/index.html.)
- "Deconstruction," entry in Encyclopedia of Religion, Second Edition, 15 vols., ed. Lindsay Jones (New York: Thomson Gale, Macmillan Reference USA, 2005), pp. 2245–48.

=== 2004 ===
- "Jacques Derrida (1930-2004)," Journal of Cultural and Religious Studies, 6:1 (December, 2004) (https://www.jcrt.org/archives/06.1/index.html).
- "Death Sentence: The Promise of Death in Amos and Derrida," in Derrida and Theology: Other Testaments, ed. Yvonne Sherwood (London: Routledge, 2004), pp.
- "Jacques Derrida (1930-2004)," Third Way (London), December 24, 2004.
- "La Philosophie et le postmodernisme prophétique: Vers une post-modernité Catholique," trans. Jean Greisch, in Raison philosophique et Christianisme à l'aube du IIIe. Millénaire, eds. Philippe Capelle and Jean Greisch (Paris: Editions du Cerf, 2004), pp. 141–62; French trans. of Caputo, John D. (2000). "Philosophy and Prophetic Postmodernism: Toward a Catholic Postmodemity". American Catholic Philosophical Quarterly. 74 (4): 549–567. doi:10.5840/acpq20007441.
- L'"idée même de l'à venir," La démocratie à venir: autour de Jacques Derrida, ed. Marie-Louise Mallet (Paris: Galilée, 2004), pp. 295–306.
- "Délier la langue," L'Herne: Derrida, eds. Marie-Louise Mallet and Ginette Michaud (Paris: Editions de l'Herne, 2004), pp. 66–70.
- "Foreword" to In Deference to the Other: Lonergan and Contemporary Continental Thought, eds. Mark Doorley and Jim Kanaris (Albany: SUNY Press, 2004), pp. vii-xiii.
- "No Tear Shall Be Lost: The History of Prayers and Tears," Ethics of History, eds. David Carr, Thomas Flynn and Rudolph Makkreel (Evanston, Ill: Northwestern University Press, 2004), pp. 91–117.
- "Olthuis's Risk: A Heretical Tribute," in The Hermeneutics of Charity: Interpretation, Selfhood and Postmodern Faith, eds. James K. A. Smith and Henry IsaacVenema (Grand Rapids: Baker/Brazos Press, 2004), pp. 41–51.
- "Good Will and the Hermeneutics of Friendship: Gadamer, Derrida and Madison,"Symposium: Canadian Journal of Continental Philosophy, 8, no. 2 (Summer, 2004): 213-25. (Special issue entitled "Working Through Postmodernity: Essays in Honor of Gary B. Madison," ed. Paul Fairfield).
- "Love Among the Deconstuctibles: A Response to Prof. Lambert," Journal of Cultural and Religious Theory, Vol 5.2 (June, 2004), www.jcrt.org
- "Either/Or, Undecidability, and Two Concepts of Irony: Kierkegaard and Derrida," in The New Kierkegaard, ed. Elsebet Jegstrup (Bloomington: Indiana University Press, 2004), pp. 14–41.
- "Apostles of the Impossible: God and the Gift in Derrida and Marion," Logos & Pneuma: Chinese Journal of Theology, No. 20 (Spring, 2004), pp. 51–88. [Chinese Translation of same in God, the Gift and Postmodernism, eds. John D. Caputo and Michael J. Scanlon (Bloomington: Indiana University Press, 1999), pp. 185–222.

=== 2003 ===
- "Apôtres de l'impossible: sur Dieu et le don chez Derrida et Marion," trans. Sophie-Jan Arrien, Philosophie, (Les Éditions de Minuit ) No. 78 (June, 2003): 33-51. [Translation of "Apostles of the Impossible: Derrida and Marion," in God, the Gift and Postmodernism, eds. John D. Caputo and Michael J. Scanlon (Bloomington: Indiana University Press, 1999), pp. 185–222.]
- "God and Anonymity: Prolegomena to an Ankhoral Religion," in A Passion for the Impossible: John D. Caputo in Focus, ed. Mark Dooley (Albany: SUNY Press, 2003), pp. 1–19.
- "The Experience of God and the Axiology of the Impossible," Religion after Metaphysics, ed. Bert Dreyfus and Mark Wrathall (London and New York: Cambridge University Press, 2003), pp. 123–45.
- "There Are No Truths, Only Texts," ARC: The Journal of the Faculty of Religious Studies, McGill University, 31 (2003): 13-22.
- "Jad oddzielic strone lew (niewlasciwa) od prawej (wlasciwej)," trans. Artur Przybystawki, Sztuka I Filozofia, 22-23 (2003): 14-21. Polish translation of "Telling Left from Right: Hermeneutics, Deconstruction, and the Work of Art," Journal of Philosophy, 83 (1986), 678-85.
- "Die diff é rance und die Sprache des Gebets," trans. Artur Boederl, in Die Sprachen der Religion, eds. Florain Uhl and Artur R. Boederl (Berlin: Parerga Verlag, 2003), pp. 293–316. Translation of "Tears Beyond Being," infra.
- "Derrida and Marion: Two Husserlian Revolutions," in Religious Experience and the End of Metaphysics, ed. Jeffrey Bloechl (Bloomington: Indiana University Press, 2003), pp. 119–34.
- "Without Sovereignty, Without Being: Unconditionality, the Coming God and Derrida's Democracy to Come," Journal of Cultural and Religious Theory, Vol 4, No. 3 (August, 2003). www.jcrt.org
- "More Rogues Than You Think: Derrida on the Cruel Logic of Sovereignty," France Today: The Journal of French Travel and Culture, Vol 18, no. 7 (September, 2003): 21-26.
- "Is There a Forbidden Knowledge," in Im Einsatz für Bildung und Erziehung: Festsschrift zum 70. Geburststag Prof. Dr. Joseph McCafferty, ed. Tadeusz Guz (Kisselegg: Fe-Medienverlag, 2003), pp. 51–70.
- "On Not Knowing Who We Are: Madness, Hermeneutics and the Night of Truth in Foucault," in Michel Foucault and Theology, eds. James Bernauer and Jeremy Carrette (Aldershot, UK: Ashgate Press, 2003), pp. 117–39. [Reprint of ch. 1 of More Radical Hermeneutics]
- "After Jacques Derrida Comes the Future," The Journal of Culture and Religious Theory, vol. 4, No. 2 (April, 2003). (An electronic journal: www.jcrt.org)
- "Confessions of a Postmodern Catholic: From St. Thomas to Derrida," eds. Curtiss Hancock and Robert Sweetman, in Faith and the Intellectual Life (Washington D.C.: The Catholic University of America Press, 2003), pp. 64–92.
- "Against Principles: A Sketch of an Ethics without Ethics," in The Ethical: Blackwell Readings in Continental Philosophy, ed. Edith Wyschogrod and Charles McKenny (Oxford: Blackwell, 2003), pp. 169–180.

=== 2002 ===
- "Tears Beyond Being: Derrida's Experience of Prayer," Théologie négative ed. Marco M. Olivetti (Padua: CEDAM, 2002), pp. 861–880.
- "For the Love of the Things Themselves: Derrida's Phenomenology of the Hyper-Real," Journal of Cultural and Religious Theory, 1.3 (July, 2000), www.jcrt.org. Reprinted in Fenomenologia Hoje II: Significado e Linguagem, Eds. Ricardo Timm de Souza and Nythamar Fernandes de Oliveria (Porto Alegre, Brazil: EDIPUCRS, 2002), pp. 37–60.
- "Good Will and the Hermeneutics of Friendship: Gadamer and Derrida ," Philosophy and Social Criticism, 28 (2002): 512-22.
- "Auto-deconstructing or Constructing a Bridge? A Reply to Thomas A. F. Kelly," American Catholic Philosophical Quarterly, 76 (2002): 341-44.
- "Looking the Impossible in the Eye: Kierkegaard, Derrida, and the Repetition of Religion," Kierkegaard Studies Yearbook 2002, ed. Niels Cappelorn (Berlin: Walter de Gruyter, 2002), pp. 1–25.
- "In Search of a Sacred Anarchy: An Experiment in Danish Deconstruction," in Calvin Schrag and the Task of Philosophy after Postmodernity, ed. William McBride and Martin Matuskik (Evanston: Northwestern University Press, 2002), pp. 226–250.
- "Por amor as coisas mesmas: o hiper-realismo de Derrida," trans. Paulo Cesar Duque-Estrada in As Margens: A proposito de Derrida, ed. Paulo Cesar Duque-Estrada (Rio de Janeiro: Editora PUC, 2002), pp. 29–48. [Portuguese translation of "For the Love of the Things Themselves")
- "We Are Not God: A Response to Stanley Fish, 'On Relativism'," The Responsive Community, 12 (Summer, 2002): 52-55.
- "Loosening Philosophy's Tongue: A Conversation with Jack Caputo," with Carl Raschke, Journal of Cultural and Religious Theory, Vol. 3, No. 2 (April, 2002). An on line journal: www.jcrt.org.
- "Richard Kearney's Enthusiasm: A Philosophical Exploration of The God Who May Be ," Modern Theology 18:1 (January, 2002): 87-94.
- "The Time of Giving, the Time of Forgiving," in The Enigma of Gift and Sacrifice eds. Edith Wyschogrod, Jean-Joseph Goux, and Eric Byonton (New York: Fordham University Press, 2002), pp. 117–47.

=== 2001 ===
- "Hoping in Hope, Hoping against Hope: A Response," in Religion With/out Religion: The Prayers and Tears of John D. Caputo, ed. James H. Olthuis (London and New York: Routledge, 2001), pp. 120–149.
- "What Do I Love When I Love My God?: An Interview with John D. Caputo," in Religion With/out Religion: The Prayers and Tears of John D. Caputo, ed. James H. Olthuis (London and New York: Routledge, 2001), pp. 150–179.
- "Messianic Postmodernism," Philosophy of Religion in the 21st Century, eds. D. Z. Phillips and Timothy Tessin (Hampshire, England: Macmillan/Palgrave, 2001), Claremont Studies in the Philosophy of Religion, pp. 153–66.
- "God is not diff é rance ," in Deconstruction: A Reader, ed. Martin McQuillan (New York: Routledge, 2001), pp. 458–63 (an excerpt from The Prayers and Tears of Jacques Derrida anthologized here).
- "The Poetics of the Impossible and the Kingdom of God," in The Blackwell Companion to Postmodern Theology, ed. Graham Ward (Oxford: Blackwell, 2001), pp. 469–481.
- "The Absence of Monica: Heidegger, Derrida, and Augustine's Confessions ," in Heidegger and Feminism, ed. Patricia Huntington and Nancy J. Holland (University Park: Pennsylvania State University Press, 2001), pp. 149–64.
- "Introduction: Who Comes After the God of Metaphysics?" in Blackwell Readings in Continental Philosophy: The Religious, editor John D. Caputo (Oxford: Blackwell, 2001)
- "What do I Love When I Love my God: Deconstruction and Radical Orthodoxy," in Questioning God, eds. John D. Caputo, Mark Dooley, Michael Scanlon (Bloomington: Indiana University Press, 2001), pp. 291–317.

=== 2000 ===
- " Philosophy and Prophetic Postmodernism: Toward a Catholic Postmodernity ,"American Catholic Philosophical Quarterly, 74: 4 (Autumn, 2000): 549-568. French Translation: " La Philosophie et le postmodernisme prophetique: Vers une post-modernit é Catholique, " trans. Philippe Capelle and Jean Greisch, UNESCO Proceedings.
- "People of God, People of Being: The Theological Presuppositions of Heidegger's Path of Thought," in Appropriating Heidegger, eds. James Faulkoner and Mark Wrathall (Cambridge: Cambridge University Press, 2000), pp. 85–100.
- "For Love of the Things Themselves: Derrida's Hyper-Realism," Journal for Cultural and Religious Theory, Vol. 1, No. 3 (August, 2000). Electronic journal (https://www.jcrt.org/current.html.)
- "Otherwise than Ethics, Or Why We Too are Sill Impious," in American Continental Philosophy: A Reader, eds. W. Brogan and J. Risser (Bloomington: Indiana University Press, 2000), pp. 261–293.
- "Adieu sans Dieu: Derrida and Levinas," in The Face of the Other and the Trace of God: Essays on the Thought of Emmanuel Levinas, ed. Jeff Bloechl. New York: Fordham University Press, 2000), pp. 276–311.
- "The End of Ethics," in Blackwell Studies in Ethics, ed. Hugh Follette (Oxford: Blackwell Publishers, 2000), pp. 111–128.

=== 1999 ===
- "Metanoetics: Elements of a Postmodern Christian Philosophy," Christian Philosophy Today (New York: Fordham University Press, 1999), pp. 189–223.
- "Postmodernism, Postsecularism, and the New World Disorder," in Europe after 1989: A Culture in Crisis? (Washington, D.C: Georgetown University Center for German and European Studies, 1999), pp. 25–41.
- "Who is Derrida's Zarathustra: Of Friendship, Fraternity and a Democracy to Come," Research in Phenomenology, 29 (1999): 184-198.
- "Toward a Postmodern Theology of the Cross: Heidegger, Augustine, Derrida," in Postmodern Philosophy and Christian Thought, ed. Merold Westphal. (Bloomington: Indiana University Press, 1999), pp. 202–225.
- "Apostles of the Impossible: Derrida and Marion," in God, the Gift and Postmodernism, eds. John D. Caputo and Michael J. Scanlon (Bloomington: Indiana University Press, 1999), pp. 185–222.
- "On Mystics, Magi, and Deconstructionists," in Portraits of American Continental Philosophers, ed. James Watson (Bloomington: Indiana University Press, 1999), pp. 24–33; German Trans. Neue Amerikanische Philosophinnen in Selbstdarstellungen, ed. James Watson (Frankfurt: Verlag Turia + Kant, 1998), pp. 60–72.
- "Heidegger," in Augustine through the Ages: An Encyclopedia, ed. Allan D. Fitzgerald, O.S.A. (Grand Rapids: Erdmanns, 1999), pp. 421–22.
- "Commentary on Ken Schmitz: "Postmodernism and the Catholic Tradition," American Catholic Philosophical Quarterly, 73:2 (Spring, 1999): 253-260.
- "Heidegger's Revolution: An Introduction to the Introduction to Metaphysics," in Heidegger toward the Turn: Essays on the Work of the 1930s, ed. James Risser (Albany: SUNY Press, 1999), pp. 53–74 [Reprint of ch. 3 of Demythologizing Heidegger]
- "Reason, History and a Little Madness: Towards an Ethics of the Kingdom," in Questioning Ethics: Contemporary Debates in Philosophy, ed. Richard Kearney and Mark Dooley. New York: Routledge, 1999. pp. 84–104.

=== 1998 ===
- "On Mystical and Other Phenomena," in Phenomenology in America, ed. Calvin Schrag (Dordrecht: Reidel Pub. Co. 1998) pp. 318–22.
- "Postmodernism and the Desire for God: An Email Conversation with Edith Wyschogrod, Cross-Currents, 48, No. 3 (Fall, 1998): 293-310.
- "An American and a Liberal: John D. Caputo's Response to Michael Zimmerman, Continental Philosophy Review, 31, 2 (1998): 215-220.
- "To the Point of a Possible Confusion: God and il y a," in Levinas: The Face of the Other. Pittsburgh: Simon Silverman Center, Duquesne University, 1998. pp. 1–36.
- "God is Wholly Other-Almost," in The Otherness of God, ed. Orrin F. Summerell (Charlottesville: University of Virginia Press, 1998), pp. 190–205.
- "Heidegger," in A Companion to Continental Philosophy, eds. Simon Critchley and William Schroeder (Oxford: Blackwell, 1998), pp. 223–233.

=== 1997 ===
- "Dasein," in Encyclopedia of Phenomenology (Dordrecht: Kluwer Academic Publishers, 1997), pp. 133–137
- "Dreaming of the Innumerable: Derrida, Drucilla Cornell, and the Dance of Gender," in Derrida and Feminism: Recasting the Question of Woman, eds. Ellen Feder, Mary C. Rawlinson, Emily Zakin (New York: Routledge, 1997), pp. 141–160.
- "A Philosophical Propaedeutic: The Very Idea of Radical Hermeneutics" (with Roy Martinez) in The Very Idea of Radical Hermeneutics, ed. Roy Martinez (Atlantic Highlands: Humanities Press, 1997), pp. 13–21.
- "Firing the Steel of Hermeneutics: Hegelianized Hermeneutics vs. Radical Hermeneutics," in Hegel, History, and Interpretation, ed. Shaun Gallagher (Albany: SUNY Press, 1997), pp. 59–70.

=== 1996 ===
- "A Community without Truth: Derrida and the Impossible Community," Research in Phenomenology, 26 (1996): 25-37.
- "Soll die Philosophie das letzte Wort haben? Levinas und der junge Heidegger über Philosophie und Glauben," in Festschrift for Hugo Ott, ed. Hermann Schäfer (Bonn: Haus der Geschichte. 1996.)
- "Instants, Secrets, Singularities: Dealing Death in Kierkegaard and Derrida," in Kierkegaard in Post/Modernity, eds. Martin Matustik and Merold Westphal (Bloomington: Indiana University Press, 1995), pp. 216–38.
- "Dark Hearts: Heidegger, Richardson, and Evil," in From Phenomenology to Thought, Errancy, and Desire, ed. Babette Babich (Dordrecht: Kluwer, 1996), pp. 267–75.

=== 1995 ===
- "Infestations: The Religion of the Death of God and Scott's Ascetic Ideal," Research in Phenomenology, 25 (1995): 261-68.
- "Bedevilling the Tradition: Deconstruction and Catholicism." In (Dis)continuity and (De)construction: Reflections on the Meaning of the Past in Crisis Situations. Ed. Josef Wissink. Kampen, The Netherlands: Pharos, 1995. pp. 12–35.

=== 1994 ===
- "Reason, History and a Little Madness: Towards a Hermeneutics of the Kingdom," Proceedings of the American Catholic Philosophical Association, 68 (1994): 27-44.
- "Sorge and kardia: The Hermeneutics of Factical Life and the Categories of the Heart," Reading Heidegger From the Start: Essays in His Earliest Thought, Eds. Theodore Kisiel and John van Buren (Albany: SUNY Press, 1994), pp. 327–343.
- "The Age of Repetition," Southern Journal of Philosophy, 32, Supplement (1994): 171-177.

=== 1993 ===
- "The Good News About Alterity: Derrida and Theology," Faith and Philosophy, 10 (1993): 453-470.
- "Heidegger, Kierkegaard and the Foundering of Metaphysics," International Kierkegaard Commentary, Vol. 6: "Fear and Trembling" and "Repetition", ed. Robert Perkins (Macon, GA: Mercer University Press, 1993), pp. 201–224.
- "In Search of the Quasi-Transcendental: The Case of Derrida and Rorty," Working Through Derrida, ed. Gary Madison (Evanston: Northwestern University Press, 1993), pp. 147–169.
- "On Not Knowing Who We Are: Foucault and the Night of Truth," in Foucault and the Critique of Institutions (above).
- "Heidegger and Theology," The Cambridge Companion to Heidegger, ed. Charles Guignon (Cambridge: Cambridge University Press, 1993), pp. 270–288.

=== 1992 ===
- "The Poetics of Suffering and the Deconstruction of Ethics," Joyful Wisdom: Sorrow and an Ethics of Joy, Studies in Postmodern Ethics, Vol. 2 (St. Catharine's, Ontario: Thought House Publishing Group, 1992), pp. 200–224.
- "How to Avoid Speaking of God: The Violence of Natural Theology," in The Prospects for Natural Theology, ed. Eugene Long (Catholic University of American Press, 1992), pp. 128–150.
- "Spirit and Danger," in Ethics and Danger, eds. Charles Scott and Arleen Dallery (Albany: SUNY Press, 1992), pp. 43–59.
- "The Difficulty of Life: A Response to Ronald McKinney," Journal of Value Inquiry, 26 (1992): 561-564.
- "Heidegger's Scandal: Thinking and the Essence of the Victim," in The Heidegger Case: On Philosophy and Politics, eds. Tom Rockmore and Joseph Margolis (Philadelphia: Temple University Press, 1992), pp. 265–281.

=== 1991 ===
- "Hyperbolic Justice: Deconstruction, Myth and Politics," Research in Phenomenology 21 (1991): 3-20.
- "Deconstructing Institutions: A Reply to Dauenhauer," Human Studies 14 (1991): 331-337.
- "Heidegger's Kampf: The Difficulty of Life," Graduate Faculty Philosophy Journal 14,2 - 15,1 (1991): 61-83.
- "Incarnation and Essentialism: A Reading of Heidegger," Philosophy Today 35 (1991): 32-42.
- "Deconstructing the Rahnerian Bridge: Heidegger and Aquinas," Philosophy and Theology (1991), Disk Supplement.

=== 1990 ===
- "Hermeneutics and Faith: A Reply to Prof. Olthuis," Christian Scholars Review 20 (December, 1990), 164-70.
- "Thinking, Poetry and Pain," The Southern Journal of Philosophy, 27 (Supplement) (1990), 155-82.
- "Radical Hermeneutics and Religious Truth: The Case of Sheehan and Schillebeeckx," in Phenomenology of the Truth Proper to religion, ed. Dan Guerriere (Albany: SUNY Press, 1990), pp. 146–172.
- "Derrida and the Study of Religion: (with Charles Winquist), Religious Studies Review, 16 (January, 1990), 19-25.

=== 1989 ===
- "Towards an American Pragrammatology: A Response to Prof. Sallis," Man and World, 22 (1989), 257-60.
- "Mysticism and Transgression: Derrida and Meister Eckhart," Continental Philosophy, II (1989), 24-39.
- "Gadamer's Closet Essentialism: A Derridean Critique," in Dialogue and Deconstruction: The Gadamer-Derrida Encounter, ed. Richard Palmer (Albany: SUNY Press, 1989), 258-64.
- "An Ethics of Dissemination," in The Ethics of the Other, ed. Charles Scott (Albany: SUNY Press, 1989), 55-62.

=== 1988 ===
- "Presidential Address: "Radical Hermeneutics and the Human Condition," Proceedings of the American Catholic Philosophical Association, 61 (1988), 2-15.
- "Demythologizing Heidegger: Aletheia and the History of Being," The Review of Metaphysics, 41 (March, 1988), 519-46. German translation: Heidegger Entmythologigisieren: Aletheia und die Seinsgeschichte, " trans. Michael Eldred, in Twisting Heidegger: Drehversuche paradistishchen Denkens, ed. Michael Eldred (Cuxhaven: Junghans-Verlag, 1993), pp. 66-91.
- "Beyond Aestheticism: Derrida's Responsible Anarchy," Research in Phenomenology, 18 (1988), 59-73.
- "From the Deconstruction of Hermeneutics to the Hermeneutics of Deconstruction," in The Horizons of Continental Philosophy: Essays on Husserl, Heidegger, and Merleau-Ponty, ed. Hugh Silverman (The Hague: Martinus Nijhoff, 1988), pp. 190–202.
- "Being and the Mystery of the Person," in The Universe as Journey: Conversations with Norris Clarke, ed. Gerald McCool (New York: Fordham University Press, 1988), pp. 93–113.
- "Modernity and the End of Philosophy in Being and Time," in Hermeneutic Phenomenology: Lectures and Essays, ed. Joseph Kockelmans (Washington: Center for Advanced Research in Phenomenology and Univ. Press of American, 1988), pp. 81–90.

=== 1987 ===
- "Derrida: A Kind of Philosopher, Research in Phenomenology, 17 (1987), 245-59.
- "The Economy of Signs in Husserl and Derrida: From Uselessness to Full Employment," in Deconstruction and Philosophy, ed. John Sallis (Chicago: Univ. of Chicago Press, 1987), pp. 99–113.

=== 1986 ===
- "Telling Left from Right: Hermeneutics, Deconstruction, and the Work of Art," Journal of Philosophy, 83 (1986), 678-85.
- "Radical Hermeneutics: Repetition, Deconstruction, and the Hermeneutic Project," Philosophy Today, 30 (1986), 271-77.
- "Cold Hermeneutics: Heidegger and Derrida," Journal of the British Society for Phenomenology, 17 (1986), 252-75.
- "Heidegger's Philosophy of Science," Rationality, Relativism and the Human Sciences, ed. J. Margolis (The Hague: Nijhoff, 1986), pp. 43–60.
- "A Phenomenology of Moral Sensibility," in Act and Agent, ed. G. McLean (Washington: Univ. Press of America, 1986), pp. 199–22.

=== 1985 ===
- "Three Transgressions: Nietzsche, Heidegger, Derrida," Research in Phenomenology, 15 (1985), 61-78.
- "From the Primordiality of Absence to the Absence of Primordiality," in Hermeneutics and Deconstruction, ed. Hugh J. Silverman (Albany: SUNY, 1985), pp. 191–200.

=== 1980 to 1984 ===
- "'Supposing Truth to be a Woman...': Heidegger, Nietzsche, Derrida," Tulane Studies in Philosophy, 32 (1984), 15-22.
- "Prudential Insight and Moral Reasoning," Proceedings of the American Catholic Philosophical Society 58 (1984), 50-55.
- "Husserl, Heidegger, and the Question of a Hermeneutic Phenomenology," Husserl Studies I (1984), 157-58. Reprinted in A Companion to Martin Heidegger's "Being and Time", Current Continental Research, No. 550, ed. Joseph Kockelmans (Washington: University Press of America, 1986), pp. 104–26.
- "Kant's Ethics in Phenomenological Perspective," in Kant and Phenomenology, ed. T. Seebohm (Washington: Univ. Press of America, 1984), pp. 129–46.
- "The Thought of Being and the Conversation of Mankind: The Case of Heidegger and Rorty," Review of Metaphysics, 36 (1983), 661-87; reprinted in Hermeneutics and Praxis, ed. Robert Hollinger (Notre Dame: University Press, 1985), pp. 248–71.
- "Heidegger's God and the Lord of History," The New Scholasticism 57 (1983), 439-64.
- "Hermeneutics As the Recovery of Man," Man and World 15 (1982), 343-67; Reprinted in Hermeneutics and Modern Philosophy, ed. Brice Wachterhauser (Albany: SUNY Press, 1986), 416-45.
- "Metaphysics, Finitude and Kant's Illusion of Practical Reason," Proceedings of the American Catholic Phil. Association 56 (1982), 87-94.
- "Heidegger and Aquinas," Philosophy Today, 26 (1982), 194-203.
- "Poverty of Thought: Heidegger and Eckhart," in Heidegger: The Man and the Thinker, ed. T. Sheehan (Chicago: Precedent Press, 1981), pp. 209–16.
- "Heidegger's Dif-ference and the ens / esse Distinction in Aquinas," International Philosophical Quarterly 20 (1980), 161-81.

=== 1975 to 1979 ===
- "The Presence of Others: A Phenomenology of the Person," Proceedings of American Catholic Philosophical Association 53 (1979): 45-58.
- "Transcendence and the Transcendental in Husserl's Phenomenology," Philosophy Today, 23 (1979): 205-16.
- "Fundamental Themes in Eckhart's Mysticism," The Thomist 42 (1978): 197-225.
- "The Question of Being and Transcendental Phenomenology: Husserl and Heidegger," Research in Phenomenology, 7 (1977), 84-105.
- "The Problem of Being in Heidegger and Aquinas," The Thomist 41 (1977), 62-91.
- "The Principle of Sufficient Reason: A Heideggerian Self-Criticism," Southern Journal of Philosophy 13 (1975), 419-26.
- "The Nothingness of the Intellect in Eckhart's Parisian Questions ," The Thomist 39 (1975), 85-115.

=== 1970 to 1974 ===
- "Meister Eckhart and the Later Heidegger, Part I," The Journal of the History of Philosophy, 12 (1974), 479-94; Part II: 13 (1975), 61-80.
- "Kant's Refutation of the Ontological Argument," Journal of the American Academy of Religion, 42 (1974), 686-91.
- "Phenomenology, Mysticism and the Grammatica Speculativa ," Journal of the British Society for Phenomenology, 5 (1974), 101-17.
- "Time and Being in Heidegger," The Modern Schoolman, 50 (1973), 325-59.
- "The Rose in Without Why: The Later Heidegger," Philosophy Today, 15 (1971), 3-15.
- "Heidegger's Original Ethics," New Scholasticism, 45 (1971), 127-38.
- "Being, Ground and Play in Heidegger," Man and World, 3 (1970), 26-48.
