= Grassie =

Grassie is a surname of Scottish origin derived from the occupation of shoemaker. Notable people with the surname include:

- Andrew Grassie (born 1966), Scottish artist
- Chris Grassie (born 1978), English football coach
- William Grassie (born 1957), American religious studies scholar and activist
