= Christopher Jargocki =

Polish-born American physicist

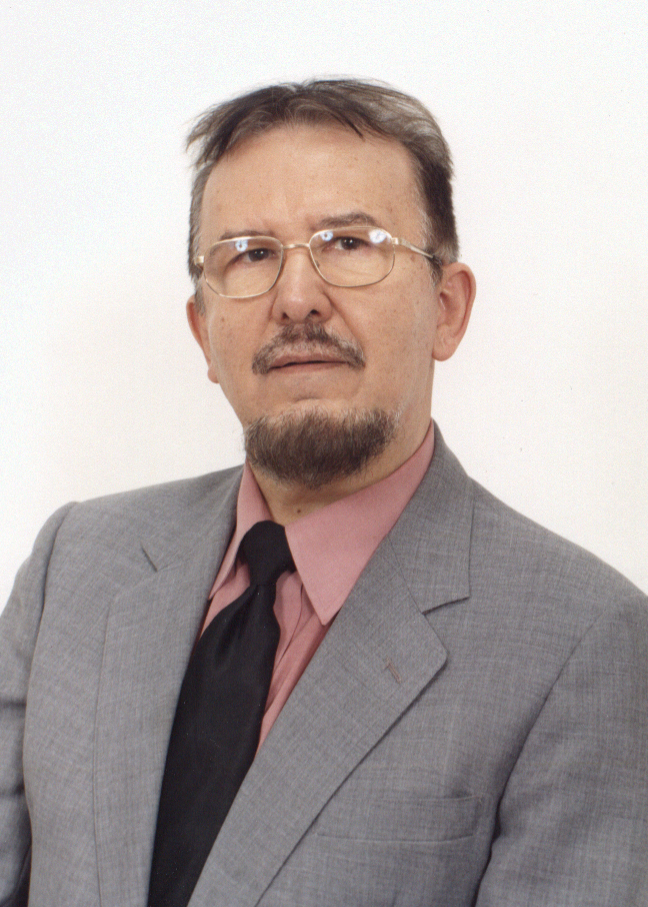
- Jargocki in 2005
- Born: April 29, 1944 (age 82); Warsaw, Poland
- Citizenship: Poland (by birth), United States (naturalized in 1971)
- Education: University of California, Irvine
- Scientific career
- Fields: Physics, Science and Religion
- Doctoral advisor: Myron Bander

Christopher Jargocki (born Krzysztof Piotr Leopold Jargocki, Polish pronunciation: [jarˌˈgɔtski], April 29, 1944 in Warsaw, Poland), also known by the pen name Christopher Jargodzki, is a Polish-born American physicist, author, and translator who is a professor emeritus of Physics at the University of Central Missouri, as well as the Director of the Center for Cooperative Phenomena. He held a previous academic appointment at Northeastern University in Boston.

== Early life ==
Jargocki was born and raised in Włochy, now a western district of Warsaw, the son of Stefania (née Lesinska) and Zdzisław Jargocki. After the Warsaw Uprising, his father was taken to Auschwitz, and then to Buchenwald where he died. Christopher Jargocki was raised as a Roman Catholic. At the age of 13, as a voice actor, he did dubbing work for the Russian children's movie Old Khottabych based on a socialist-realist book by Lazar Lagin.

== Education ==
In 1957 Jargocki, age 13, enrolled in Lyceum No. 32 in Włochy, choosing the humanities orientation. After obtaining his matura (high school degree) at age 17 in 1961, Jargocki passed competitive entrance exams and enrolled in the Department of Physics at the University of Warsaw. He continued his education at the University of California, Los Angeles, earning a Bachelor of Science degree in physics in 1966. He entered a doctoral program at the University of California, Irvine, where he received his doctorate in elementary particle theory in 1981.

== Writing career ==
From 1966 to 1975 Jargocki worked part-time as a translator of books and articles from Russian and other languages into English for the American Mathematical Society and SCITRAN.

In 1977 Jargocki replaced Isaac Asimov as the contributing editor to the Science Digest Quick Quiz, a feature of Science Digest, a monthly American magazine published from 1937 through 1986.

His four books, the last two co-authored with Franklin Potter, deal primarily with paradoxes and misconceptions in physics and astronomy.

== Awards and honors ==
In 1996 he won a $10,000 award in the worldwide science and religion course competition sponsored by the John Templeton Foundation for a course entitled, Science and Religion: From Conflict to Dialogue. The course has become a component of the core curriculum at the University of Central Missouri.

In 2002 the book Mad About Physics was selected by the New York Public Library as one of the best books of the year 2001 in the teen category.

In 2014 Christopher Jargocki was named a Kosciuszko Foundation Distinguished Fellow.

In 2019 he received an Albert Nelson Marquis Lifetime Achievement Award.

He is listed in American Men and Women of Science.

He is a VIP Listee with Marquis Who's Who.

== Center for Cooperative Phenomena ==
In 2006, Jargocki founded the Center for Cooperative Phenomena to promote the study of the emergent, and specifically, cooperative phenomena at all levels of complexity from the physical to social sciences. One of his major areas of interest is the subject of synchronicity.

== Encyclopedia of Conversational English ==
Jargocki founded the website in November 2013. From the welcome page: "We hope that the Encyclopedia of Conversational English will become a standard reference and/or text for students and teachers of English as a Second Language, both in the United States and around the world. In a sense, the Encyclopedia may be viewed as a time capsule describing the language and culture of the United States and Great Britain as they have existed in the last 15-20 years."

Currently, the project comprises two volumes, Communication and Education, containing more than 2600 webpages. Volumes dealing with Daily Life and Transportation are forthcoming.

== Selected bibliography ==
=== Books ===
- Science Braintwisters, Paradoxes, and Fallacies (1976, Charles Scribner's Sons, hardcover, ISBN 0-684-14532-4)
- Science Braintwisters, Paradoxes, and Fallacies (1978, Charles Scribner's Sons, paperback, ISBN 0-684-15585-0)
- More Science Braintwisters and Paradoxes (1983, Van Nostrand Reinhold, hardcover, ISBN 0-442-24524-6)
- Mad About Physics - Braintwisters, Paradoxes, and Curiosities (2001, with Franklin Potter, John Wiley & Sons, Inc., quality paperback, ISBN 0-471-56961-5)
- Mad About Modern Physics - Braintwisters, Paradoxes, and Curiosities (2005, with Franklin Potter as lead author, John Wiley & Sons, Inc., quality paperback, ISBN 0-471-44855-9).

=== Papers ===
- C. Jargocki and M. Bander, Field-theoretic Version of a Two-Dimensional Coulomb Gas with Repulsive Cores, Physical Review B 23, Jan. 1, 1981
- R. Aaron, M.H. Friedman, and C.P. Jargocki, Calculations of q¯2 q2 States in Potential Theory, Physical Review D 28, Oct. 1, 1983
- C. Jargocki, Teleology versus Natural Selection in Anthropic Cosmology, Proceedings of the Institute for Liberal Studies, Vol. 4, Fall 1993.

=== Lectures ===
- "From Reductionism to Emergence: Science Takes a Cooperative Turn,” a talk given at the international Metanexus Institute conference “Continuity & Change: Perspectives on Science and Religion,” June 6, 2006, in Philadelphia, PA.
- “Cosmic Optimism: From the Principle of Maximum Diversity to Path Optimization,” a talk given at the international Metanexus Institute conference “Transdisciplinarity and the Unity of Knowledge: Beyond the ‘Science and Religion Dialogue,’” June 4, 2007, in Philadelphia, PA.
- "From Stephen Hawking's Flexiverse to Synchronicity: Intimations of Our Transhuman Future," a talk given at the international Metanexus Institute conference "Cosmos, Nature, Culture: A Transdisciplinary Conference," July 18 – 21, 2009, in Phoenix, AZ.

=== Video Lecture ===
- "Changing Views of Synchronicity: From Carl Jung to Robert Perry," a talk given at Loyola University Maryland, March 25, 2010, in Baltimore, MD.

=== Audio Interviews ===
- Paradoxes. February 21, 2011. Sift Podcast.
- Top-Down Cause. December 31, 2011. Sift Podcast.

=== TV Interview ===
- TV interview with Dr. Jargocki on YouTube taped in 1991.

=== Translations ===
- V. T. Fomenko, “On Infinitesimal Deformations of Convex Surfaces with a Boundary Condition of Generalized Translation,” 1969 Math. USSR Sbornik 9. Translated from Russian.
- M. L. Tsetlin, Automaton Theory and Modeling of Biological Systems (1973, Academic Press, hardcover, ISBN 978-0-12-701650-4). Translated from Russian.
