= Mad About Physics =

Book by Christopher Jargocki

Mad about Physics: Braintwisters, Paradoxes, and Curiosities
- Mad about Physics cover (1st Ed.)
- Author: Christopher Jargodzki & Franklin Potter
- Illustrator: Tina Cash-Walsh
- Cover artist: Wendy Mount & André Craeyveldt
- Language: English
- Subject: Physics
- Publisher: John Wiley and Sons
- Publication place: United States
- Media type: Print
- Pages: 320
- ISBN: 978-0471569619

Mad about Physics: Brainteasers, Paradoxes, and Curiosities is a book revolving around physics puzzles first released in 2001 and published by Wiley.

It covers mechanics, electricity, magnetism and optics, as well as the physics of sports, space exploration and astronomy. It has been translated into seven languages, including German, Greek, Japanese and Chinese. The book is in its 10th reprinting as of 2013.

== Content ==
The book contains around 400 questions, along with many marginalia, jokes, anecdotes, and scientific facts. It also contains some quotations from Albert Einstein and the cartoon character Bugs Bunny congruent to the theme of the book.

== Reception and Reviews ==
Peter Ford, a physicist at the University of Bath in the UK, called Mad about Physics "an interesting new book." He wrote that "many of its problems will be useful for teachers, both at senior level in schools and at universities, for discussion with students in small groups. Such tutorials should be used to encourage students to start talking about physics and 'thinking like a physicist.'"

Carol Ryback wrote, "Here's a quick fix for those brain-teasing inquiries that stick in your mind like an old song. While not limited to astronomy-related trivia, 'Mad about Physics"—like a top-40 countdown on the radio – has an allure that makes you want more."

== Awards ==
In 2002, Mad about Physics was selected by the New York Public Library as "one of the best" titles of the year 2001 in the teen books and media category.

== See also ==
- Cognitive dissonance
- Paradox
