= William Grassie =

American activist

William John Grassie (born May 3, 1957) is an American activist for numerous causes, including nonviolence and a freeze on nuclear weapons, reform of science education, and greater dialogue between science and religion. He is the executive director of Metanexus Institute, an organization which worked closely with the John Templeton Foundation to promote "dialogue and interactive syntheses between religion and the sciences internationally".

== Early years ==
Grassie was born in Wilmington, Delaware, and attended Middlebury College. He is member of the Quakers.

== Social activism ==
In 1980, in Philadelphia, he promoted nuclear disarmament through the Friends Peace Committee, where he helped to found the Nuclear Weapons Freeze Campaign.

Grassie was arrested in several non-violent civil disobedience actions and was a symbolic war tax resister. Grassie and David Falls, another employee of the Religious Society of Friends, a Quaker organization, refused to pay federal taxes on the grounds that it would support nuclear war, but a judge ruled, in a civil suit by the Internal Revenue Service in 1990, that the church was obliged to enforce levies against the salaries of the two employees. A statement by the Friends Quaker religious organization said, "They.... are not tax evaders, but deeply religious and conscientiously motivated individuals who feel they cannot pay the military portion of their taxes without violating the central tenets of their religious faith."

In 1987 and 1988, Grassie worked as a community organizer in southwest Germantown, Philadelphia, and organized the "Three Hundred Anniversary Celebration of the Germantown Protest Against Slavery" in commemoration of the first European protest against slavery in the New World (1688). The project was designed as a community development initiative and helped to catalyze a community revitalization project now known as "Freedom Square".

== Academia ==
Grassie earned a Ph.D. in comparative religion from Temple University in 1994 and was an assistant professor in its "Intellectual Heritage Program".

== Metanexus ==
The Philadelphia Center for Religions and Science was founded in 1998.It changed its name in 2000 to the Metanexus Institute on Religion and Science to reflect its international reach. In 2011, the organization shortened its name to simply Metanexus Institute and is now based in New York City. The organization originally promoted dialog between religion and science, but now "promotes scientifically rigorous and philosophically open-ended explorations of foundational questions" through engagement with Big History.

== Books ==
- William Grassie (2018). Applied Big History: A Guide for Entrepreneurs, Investors, and Other Living Things. Mexanexus Imprints. ISBN 978-1719853071.
- William Grassie (2010). The New Sciences of Religion: Exploring Spirituality from the Outside In and Bottom Up. New York: Palgrave Macmillan. ISBN 978-1070628325.
- William Grassie (2010). Politics by Other Means: Science and Religion in the 21st Century. Philadelphia: Metanexus. ISBN 978-1450038485.
- William Grassie; Gregory Hansell, eds. (2011). H+/-: Transhumanism and Its Critics. Philadelphia: Metanexus – via Amazon.
- William Grassie, ed. (2010). Advanced Methodologies in the Scientific Study of Religious and Spiritual Phenomena. Philadelphia: Metanexus. ISBN 978-1453523926.

== See also ==
- List of peace activists
