= Patricia Huntington =

American philosopher

Education
- Education: Fordham University (MA, PhD), San Diego State University (BA)

Philosophical work
- Era: 21st-century philosophy
- Region: Western philosophy
- Institutions: Arizona State University (2008–), Loyola University of Chicago (1998–2007), American University (1996–1998), Moravian College (1994–1995)

Patricia J. Huntington is an American philosopher and Professor of Philosophy at Arizona State University. She is known for her works on continental philosophy.

== Books ==
- Loneliness and Lament: A Journey to Receptivity, Indiana University Press, 2009
- Feminist Interpretations of Martin Heidegger, edited with Nancy J. Holland, Pennsylvania State University Press, 2001
- Ecstatic Subjects, Utopia, and Recognition: Kristeva, Heidegger, Irigaray, State University of New York Press, 1998
