= Nancy J. Holland =

American philosopher

Nancy Holland
- Born: January 12, 1947
- Died: January 25, 2020 (aged 73)

Education
- Education: Stanford University (BA), University of California at Berkeley (PhD)

Philosophical work
- Era: 21st-century philosophy
- Region: Western philosophy
- Institutions: Hamline University

Nancy J. Holland (January 12, 1947 – January 25, 2020) was an American philosopher and Professor of Philosophy at Hamline University. She was known for her works on continental philosophy.

== Books ==
- Ontological Humility: Lord Voldemort and the Philosophers, SUNY Press, 2013
- Heidegger and the Problem of Consciousness, Indiana University Press, 2018,
- Feminist Interpretations of Martin Heidegger, edited with Patricia Huntington, Pennsylvania State University Press, 2001
