= Metanexus Institute =

The Metanexus Institute is a not-for-profit organization founded in 1997 to explore scientific and philosophical questions. The institute has organized the exchange of ideas through conferences and published books. It has EIN 23-2977021 as a 501(c)(3) Public Charity; in 2016, it claimed $28,249 in total revenue and $8,827 in total assets.

== History ==
With the help of Peter Dodson, Soloman Katz, Andrew Newberg, and Stephen Dunning, William Grassie created the Philadelphia Center for Religion and Science (PCRS) to promote literacy in science and religion by hosting seminars, courses, and conferences. PCRS was renamed to Metanexus Institute in 2000, and the Meta-List was relaunched as a website with the support of a grant from the John Templeton Foundation, and Metanexus launched a $5.1 million Local Societies Initiative. In 2003, Metanexus launched the $3.3 million Spiritual Transformation Scientific Research Project. The organization hosted numerous conferences at universities and elsewhere, including a conference entitled Science and Religion in Context at the University of Pennsylvania. Metanexus has promoted the concept of Big History, sometimes termed the Epic of Evolution, which examines history using long time frames through a multidisciplinary approach.
