= Timeline of intelligent design =

This timeline of intelligent design outlines the major events in the development of intelligent design as presented and promoted by the intelligent design movement.

== Creationism ==
- 1920s: Fundamentalist–Modernist Controversy – in an upsurge of fundamentalist religious fervor, anti-evolutionary sentiment stopped U.S. public schools from teaching evolution, through state laws such as Tennessee's 1925 Butler Act, and by getting evolution removed from biology textbooks nationwide.
- 1959 National Defense Education Act, responding to fears of backwardness raised by the 1957 Sputnik, promoted science and Biological Sciences Curriculum Study textbooks teaching evolution were used in almost half of high schools, though the prohibitions were still in place and a 1961 attempt to repeal the Butler Act failed.
- 1961 publication of The Genesis Flood.
- 1965 The term "scientific creationism" gained currency.
- 1968 Michael Polanyi article in Science titled "Life's Irreducible Structure" on comparisons between living organisms and machines.
- 1968 Epperson v. Arkansas ruled against state laws prohibiting the teaching of evolution, concluding that they violate the Establishment Clause of the First Amendment to the United States Constitution which prohibits state aid to religion. States may not alter the curriculum to conform to the beliefs of particular religious sects.
- 1975 Daniel v. Waters rules that a state law requiring biology textbooks discussing "origins or creation of man and his world" to give equal treatment to creation as per Genesis is unconstitutional, creationists change to Creation science omitting explicit biblical references.
- 1977 Hendren v. Campbell rules that use of the 1970 Creation Research Society textbook Biology: A Search For Order In Complexity, though claimed to present a balanced view of evolution and Biblical Creation, promotes a specific sectarian religious view, and is unconstitutional in public schools. "We may note that with each new decision of the courts religious proponents have attempted to modify or tailor their approach to active lobbying in state legislatures and agencies. Softening positions and amending language, these groups have, time and again, forced the courts to reassert and redefine the prohibitions of the First Amendment. Despite new and continued attempts by such groups, however, the courts are bound to determine, if possible, the purpose of the approach."

=== Creation science school textbooks and the Foundation for Thought and Ethics ===
- 1980 Foundation for Thought and Ethics (FTE) formed by ordained minister Jon Buell as a "Christian think-tank", its first activity to be the editing of a book "showing the scientific evidence for creation.".
- 1981 FTE filed IRS declaration that it had been "established to introduce biblical perspective into the mainstream of America's humanistic society, confronting the secular thought of modern man with the truth of God's Word." It said their "first project is a rigorous scientific critique of the theory of prebiotic evolution. Next, we will develop a two-model high school biology textbook that will fairly and impartially view the scientific evidences for creation side by side with evolution. (In this case Scripture or even religious doctrine would violate the separation of church and state.)" The first was The Mystery of Life's Origin (published in 1984), the second eventually became Of Pandas and People.
- 1981 state of Arkansas passed a law, Act 590, mandating that "creation science" be given equal time in public schools with evolution, and defining creation science as positing the "creation of the universe, energy, and life from nothing," as well as explaining the earth's geology "by occurrence of a worldwide flood." McLean v. Arkansas ruling issued on January 5, 1982, is that the Act was unconstitutional, the creationists' methods were not scientific but took the literal wording of the Book of Genesis and attempted to find scientific support for it. The clear, specific definition of science used to rule that "creation science" is religion, not science, had a powerful influence on subsequent rulings.
- 1982 Louisiana's "Balanced Treatment for Creation-Science and Evolution-Science in Public School Instruction" Act (Creationism Act) forbids the teaching of the theory of evolution in public schools unless accompanied by instruction in "creation science." Thus two states had passed these "equal time" laws.
- 1983 Percival Davis and Dean H. Kenyon produce Creation Biology Textbook Supplements, an early draft of the work later retitled Of Pandas and People. Charles Thaxton was the project chairman and academic editor.

=== The ID movement begins ===
- 1984 book The Mystery of Life's Origin by Charles Thaxton, Walter Bradley and Roger Olsen, foreword by Kenyon, argued that "it is fundamentally implausible that unassisted matter and energy organized themselves into living systems”. It said the first cell would have been too complex to form through natural unguided processes, so there must have been intervention by an intelligent agency, possibly an intelligent alien. Barbara Forrest describes this as the beginning of the ID movement.
- 1984 Kenyon's affidavit for what becomes Edwards v. Aguillard gives Definitions "Creation-science means origin through abrupt appearance in complex form, and includes biological creation, biochemical creation (or chemical creation), and cosmic creation.", "Creation-science does not include as essential parts the concepts of catastrophism, a world-wide flood, a recent inception of the earth or life, from nothingness (ex nihilo), the concept of kinds, or any concepts from Genesis or other religious texts." Statements included "The creationist scientific conclusion is that empirical data currently in hand demand the inference that the first living organisms were created." and "The origin of printed texts, manufactured devices, and biomolecular systems require intelligent design and engineering know-how (Wilder-Smith 1970). In each case the characteristic order of the system must be impressed on matter 'from the outside.'" It claims creation and evolution the only scientific explanations of life — what Forrest calls "the dual model".

This is later characterised by the DI's Witt as "There Kenyon described a science open to intelligent causes but one free of religious presuppositions or assertions about the identity of the designer. He described how he did origins science, how a science open to intelligent causes ought to be done." Witt claims that this is a different creation science from Young Earth Creationism (YEC).

- 1985 District Court Aguillard v. Treen held that there can be no valid secular reason for prohibiting the teaching of evolution, a theory historically opposed by some religious denominations. The court further concluded that "the teaching of 'creation-science' and 'creationism,' as contemplated by the statute, involves teaching 'tailored to the principles' of a particular religious sect or group of sects." (citing Epperson v. Arkansas (1968)). The District Court therefore held that the Creationism Act violated the Establishment Clause either because it prohibited the teaching of evolution or because it required the teaching of creation science with the purpose of advancing a particular religious doctrine. The court of Appeals affirmed.
- 1985 Michael Denton's book: Evolution: A Theory in Crisis. Prominent figures in ID credit his critical examination of Darwinism with their change of view (Behe, Johnson).
- 1986 FTE copyrighted draft entitled Biology and Creation by Kenyon & Davis. (note Charles Thaxton academic editor, not clear from when)
- Autumn 1986 FTE, under the name of "Austin Analytic Consulting", carried out survey of 300 high-school science teachers to show potential mainline publishers that a market existed for a supplementary textbook to "balance" evolution teaching in class.
- 1987 FTE copyrighted draft entitled Biology and Origins by Kenyon & Davis.
- 1987 FTE's founder Jon Buell sought a publisher for the book, telling a Boston firm "A new independent scientific poll (report enclosed) shows almost half of the nation's biology teachers include some creation in their view of biological origins. Many more who don't still believe it should be included in science curriculum. ... The U.S. Fifth Circuit Court of Appeals says that teachers are free to teach scientific information that happens to support creation if they wish. In ruling on the so-called Louisiana "Balanced Treatment Act" this Spring the U.S. Supreme Court may not affirm state-mandated teaching of creation, but they will almost certainly let stand the above academic freedom for teachers." "The enclosed projections showing revenues of Over 6.5 million in five years are based upon modest expectations for the market provided the U.S. Supreme Court does not uphold the Louisiana "Balanced Act". If, by chance it should uphold it, then you can throw out these projections, the nationwide market would be explosive!" "the book will not be subject to the major criticism of creation, that the supernatural lies outside of science, because its central statement is that scientific evidence points to an intelligent cause, but that science is silent as to whether that intelligence is within or beyond the material universe. So the book is not appealing to the supernatural."

== Edwards v. Aguillard ruling, Pandas ==
- August 1986 Amicus Curae brief by scientific organisations and 72 Nobel Prize winning scientists set out the argument that the Louisiana Act's definition of "creation-science" was religious dogma, including creation ex nihilo, created kinds of life, worldwide deluge and young Earth, the legislation described conventional "creation-science" and not the "abrupt appearance" construct presented to the court which was ill-defined and "a post hoc invention, created for the purpose of defending this unconstitutional Act." They asserted that:

Science is devoted to formulating and testing naturalistic explanations for natural phenomena. It is a process for systematically collecting and recording data about the physical world, then categorizing and studying the collected data in an effort to infer the principles of nature that best explain the observed phenomena. Science is not equipped to evaluate supernatural explanations for our observations; without passing judgment on the truth or falsity of supernatural explanations, science leaves their consideration to the domain of religious faith. Because the scope of scientific inquiry is consciously limited to the search for naturalistic principles, science remains free of religious dogma and is thus an appropriate subject for public-school instruction.

- June 19, 1987 Supreme Court ruled in Edwards v. Aguillard that the Louisiana Creationism Act violated the Establishment Clause of the First Amendment: it lacked a clear secular purpose, did not protect academic freedom as claimed, and instead of encouraging "the teaching of all scientific theories about human origins ... [had the] purpose of discrediting evolution by counterbalancing its teaching at every turn with the teaching of creationism. ... endorses religion by advancing the religious belief that a supernatural being created humankind ... [Its] primary purpose was to change the public school science curriculum to provide persuasive advantage to a particular religious doctrine that rejects the factual basis of evolution in its entirety." However, the statement that "teaching a variety of scientific theories about the origins of humankind to school children might be validly done with the clear secular intent of enhancing the effectiveness of science instruction." left a loophole for ID.
- 1987 FTE copyrighted draft retitled Of Pandas and People: The Central Questions of Biological Origins, reference to Edwards decision added in footnote, as in earlier drafts had definition "Creation means that the various forms of life began abruptly through the agency of an intelligent creator with their distinctive features already intact. Fish with fins and scales, birds with feathers, beaks, and wings, etc."

=== Creation becomes intelligent design ===
- 1987 (according to a 2005 apologia by the DI's Witt) Thaxton's definition of "creation-science" had been overruled at Edwards by being equated to YEC. As the academic editor for FTE, serving as the editor for Pandas, Thaxton needed a new term and found it in a phrase he'd picked up from a NASA scientist – intelligent design. He thought "That's just what I need, it's a good engineering term ... it seemed to jibe. When I would go to meetings, I noticed it was a phrase that would come up from time to time. And I went back through my old copies of Science magazine and found the term used occasionally." Soon the term intelligent design was incorporated into the language of the book.
- 1987 Shortly after the Supreme Court decision, in a new draft of Pandas, approximately 150 uses of the root word "creation", such as "creationism" and "creationist", were systematically changed to refer to intelligent design, with "creationists" being changed to "design proponents" or, in one instance, "cdesign proponentsists". Accordingly, in the definition "creation" was changed to "intelligent design", so that it now read "Intelligent design means that various forms of life began abruptly through an intelligent agency, with their distinctive features already intact. Fish with fins and scales, birds with feathers, beaks, wings, etc." This wording was essentially unchanged when published in 1989 and in the 1993 2nd. edition.

=== Johnson vs. evolution ===
- 1987–1988 academic year, Phillip E. Johnson had a year's sabbatical as a visiting professor at University College London.
  - 1987 He read the Blind Watchmaker by evolutionary biologist Richard Dawkins and Evolution: A Theory in Crisis by the creationist Michael Denton, then Isaac Asimov's Guide to Science, and found purpose in life – he read the amicus briefs in Edwards and concluded that the definition of science was loaded against creationism. Johnson decided that the creationists had lost that case because of their unfair exclusion from science by the scientific community's naturalistic definition of science. Consequently, creationists must redefine science to restore the supernatural.
  - Autumn term 1987 Johnson met Stephen C. Meyer who was working on a doctorate in philosophy at the University of Cambridge, and writing a thesis that analyzed methodological issues in origins sciences.
- June 23–26, 1988, Charles Thaxton [editor of Of Pandas and People ] held a conference titled Sources of Information Content in DNA in Tacoma, Washington, and presented the conference with a paper titled "In Pursuit of Intelligent Causes: Some Historical Background", arguing "that intelligent causes are a viable option today for science". Stephen C. Meyer was at the conference, and later recalled that "The term intelligent design came up in 1988 at a conference in Tacoma, Wash., called Sources of Information Content in DNA ... Charles Thaxton referred to a theory that the presence of DNA in a living cell is evidence of a designing intelligence. We weren't political; we were thinking about molecular biology and information theory. This wasn't stealth creationism." Meyer brought a copy of Johnson's draft book, and Paul A. Nelson remembered "Stephen Meyer, at the time a graduate student at Cambridge University, attended Thaxton’s conference, bringing with him a manuscript from (as Meyer put it with a grin) 'this wild lawyer I met in the UK.' I can still recall my excitement at the conference when I read through the manuscript, which later became Darwin on Trial." The conference also gained the attention of Denton and Plantinga. There was now a question of finding a suitable umbrella term for the emerging movement: Thaxton had avoided the word "design" as this aroused opposition in biology, he reviewed historic wording such as "creative intelligence".
- August 1988 Johnson's draft of "Position Paper on Darwinism" (this was issued to Campion Center participants a few days before 30 November 1989 revised summary).
- Bennetta, William J. (1988). "The Rise and Fall of the Louisiana Creationism Law". Terra (July/August and September/October). Natural History Museum of Los Angeles County. reviews sequence of cases, predicts "We shall hear more about “abrupt appearance,” whether it is called by that name or another one, as the creationists recover from the collapse of their legislative campaign and turn their energies back to the activities that historically have produced their biggest successes. Those activities have been aimed not at legislatures but at administrative agencies—local ones especially." Notes "Because the term 'creation-science' has been sullied, most recently in Edwards v. Aguillard, the creationists’ new pseudoscience will carry a new name, or perhaps several new names. Its content will be fully sterilized: it will avoid explicit supernaturalism, and it will speak not of any god but of a nebulous 'intelligence' or 'intelligent cause.' " Work already done by the done by the Foundation for Thought and Ethics, outlines TMoLO, "The Foundation recently has been seeking a publisher for another manuscript, Biology and Origin .. [which it wants] to become a school book and to carry its sterilized fundamentalism directly into public-school science classrooms." It had sponsored an opinion poll in 1986; "Most biology teachers, the Foundation says, think that creationist doctrines should be brought into science classes to countervail evolutionary views, and most would welcome a supplemental text that would help them to present creationist doctrines in their own classrooms!"
- December 1988 Thaxton decided to use the label "intelligent design" instead of creationism for his new movement. (a term edited into Pandas drafts in 1987)
  December 1988, Thaxton lectured at Princeton and as an overhead visuals, used a July news article clipping headlined "Space Face". It discussed speculation about the 1976 photograph of a sphinxlike "face on Mars" taken by the Viking 1 orbiter, and had a comment from a scientist about deciphering "intelligent design" in nature. The phrase worked well in Thaxton's lecture. Buell had a publication deadline of 1989 for Pandas, and Thaxton had to choose a term for its use of design theory: "Finally, the day came when we were going to have to decide".
  - 1988–1990 Meyer introduced Johnson to Denton and Paul Nelson: "I met Steve Meyer, who was in England at the time. Through Steve, I got to know the others, who were developing what became the Intelligent Design movement. Michael Denton stayed in my home for three days while he was in the United States. Meyer introduced me to Paul Nelson, and so on. One by one, these people came together.".

=== Of Pandas and People published ===
- 1989 survey found that more than 30% of a national sample of high school biology teachers wanted to teach "creation science".
- August 1989 Of Pandas and People was published, printed by "Haughton Publishing Co." (Horticultural Printers, Inc. of Dallas, with no other books in print). It included all of the basic arguments of intelligent design in essentially modern form (except for Behe's irreducible complexity argument which appeared in the 1993 edition). In 2004, Jon Buell of the FTE stated this was "the first place where the phrase 'intelligent design' appeared in its present use."

=== Campaign to get intelligent design into schools ===
- 1989 Haughton and the FTE campaigned to get Pandas into schools across the U.S. – mobilizing local Christian conservative groups to push school boards and individual teachers to adopt the book and also to get themselves elected to school boards and local educational committees. They claimed that intelligent design was "accepted science, a view that is held by many highly qualified scientists".
- September 12, 1989, at the Alabama hearings on approved school textbooks. Pandas was on the list but not in the libraries for public viewing as required. An Eagle Forum chapter director praised Pandas as an exemplary scientific text presenting an alternative to modern evolutionary theory based on "intelligent design". With NCSE assistance, written criticism was sent to committee members and on October 2, a majority of the State Textbook Committee voted against Pandas, partly because of its thinly disguised religious underpinnings. This decision was subject to adoption by the State Board of Education in December.
- November 1989, Haughton advertised Pandas in the monthly of the National Science Teachers Association (NSTA) and other journals, claiming it had been "prepared with academic integrity" and had been "Authored by mainstream, published science educators", and promoted it at teachers' association conventions.
- November 1989, Pandas was promoted by members of religiously oriented citizen pressure groups like Concerned Women for America and Citizens for Excellence in Education. It was under consideration for state adoption in both Idaho and Alabama, and to be submitted in Texas and other states in the coming months. With grass-roots promotion it also had a good chance of showing up in local districts of non-adoption states.
- December 1989 a church campaign in Alabama gathered over 11,800 signatures on a petition to add Pandas to the list of approved school textbooks, after weeks of urging from a Christian radio station in Tuscaloosa.
- December 14, 1989, at the Alabama State Board of Education meeting to consider adoption of the textbook list, Haughton Publishing made an elaborate presentation. A Birmingham businessman presented petitions with over 11,800 signatures urging the board to adopt supplementary materials presenting "Intelligent Design" as an alternative to evolution. The attorney for Haughton, Hare, charged that opponents had falsely painted Pandas as a creationist text, and said that "Intelligent Design" does not compel belief in the supernatural. The Board requested legal advice, and a January hearing was set up just to consider Pandas.
- January 8, 1990, Buell and Thaxton were amongst speakers for Pandas at the hearing, but the publisher Haughton tried to withdraw and end the hearing on procedural grounds. The meeting continued, but Haughton then threatened to sue the committee members if they rejected the book rather than accepting that it had been withdrawn, as rejection would injure future sales prospects. The committee passed a resolution recognizing its withdrawal.
- Active promotion by creationists of "Pandas for public school use continued throughout the 1990s, then after 2000 activity largely died down.

== Discovery Institute founded, Johnson's views ==
- November 30, 1989, Johnson wrote to Campion Center participants that "the August 1988 draft of my paper which was distributed to you only a few days ago is a bit lengthy and dense" so sends them the latest draft of his "Position paper on Darwinism" as an "informal summary of my views" (from the book he was working on) stated "The important issue is not the relationship of science and creationism, but the relationship of science and materialist philosophy." He wanted school textbooks to acknowledge alleged problems with evolution. "More importantly, the universities should be opened up to genuine intellectual inquiry into the fundamental assumptions of Darwinism and scientific materialism. The possibility that Darwinism is false, and that no replacement theory is currently available."
- 1990 "At that time there was a little funding to pay for people to come to Seattle occasionally for a conference. So they had me speak at one in 1989 [sic] to look me over. I soon became the leader of the group." (Johnson, November 2000) Witham says that in 1990 "the intelligent design fraternity held a meeting to scrutinize the California lawyer", Johnson is quoted as saying [later] "It's a question of looking someone over ... I very much approve of that." Yerxa writes that in 1990, Meyer invited Johnson to Portland, Oregon, "and introduced him to his associates, the nucleus of the future Discovery Institute.".
- 1990 Haughton admitted sales of Pandas so far had been single-copy. Instead of attempts to get state textbook approval, the FTE was now directing efforts "outside the schools" to the grass-roots level, targeting local school boards, teacher's groups, and parents.
- May 1990 a FTE letter by Jon Buell announced a new sales campaign as they'd found it best to approach the local school system through the biology teacher. It included an 18-minute video with the endorsements of a number of scientists, educators, and an authority on First Amendment law, and a Suggested Plan of Action for volunteers suggesting: finding a sympathetic biology teacher (perhaps a fellow church member) who then convinces the curriculum committee and/or administration to approve use of Pandas without need for funding, then a local church purchases the books and donates them to the school.
- 1990 Discovery Institute (DI) is founded by Bruce Chapman, but lacks a defining issue.
- October 1990 Johnson's booklet Evolution as Dogma: The Establishment of Naturalism was published under the auspices of the FTE by Haughton Publishing. In this, Johnson said that "Darwinism" is "a theory of naturalistic evolution, which means that it absolutely rules out any miraculous or supernatural intervention at any point. Everything is conclusively presumed to have happened through purely material mechanisms that are in principle accessible to scientific investigation, whether they have yet been discovered or not." He stated that "Victory in the creation-evolution dispute therefore belongs to the party with the cultural authority to establish the ground rules that govern the discourse. If creation is admitted as a serious possibility, Darwinism cannot win, and if it is excluded a priori Darwinism cannot lose." He cited the logic of what he called "the Natural Academy of Sciences", as accepted by the Supreme Court at Edwards, that "creation-science" is not science because it does not rely upon naturalistic explanations, but holds "that the creation of the universe, the earth, living things, and man was accomplished through supernatural means inaccessible to human understanding".
- November 1990 - the FTE's First Things published critiques of Johnson's Evolution as Dogma article, and his own response "A Reply to My Critics".
- 1991 professor Phillip A. Bishop at the University of Alabama was told to stop proselytizing students in class and teaching "intelligent design theory" in an optional class. At Bishop v. Aronov he sued the college on free speech and academic freedom grounds, and won at District Court but the Appeals Court found that the university had a right to set the curriculum.

=== Johnson's first book, Darwin on Trial ===
- June 3, 1991 Johnson's first book, Darwin on Trial published by Regnery Gateway (Intervarsity edition 1992) and described a creationist in the broadest sense as "simply a person who believes that the world (and especially mankind) was designed, and exists for a purpose." Johnson claimed that Darwinism inherently and explicitly denies such a belief and therefore constitutes a naturalistic philosophy intrinsically opposed to religion.
  It does not use the term "intelligent design" for Johnson's ideas, though it does mention at one point that "the presence of intelligent design in the cosmos is so obvious that even an atheist like Pagels cannot help noticing it ...", and in the citations list includes Of Pandas and People, saying "This book is 'creationist' only in the sense that it juxtaposes a paradigm of 'intelligent design' with the dominant paradigm of (naturalistic) evolution", and makes the case for the former. It does not rely on the authority of the Bible."
- 1991: Johnson has said of this period that "By the time Darwin on Trial was published, I had pretty well worked out the strategy I thought would, in time, win this campaign, and I've been able to convince most of the young-earth creationists and the old-earth creationists that this is the right way to proceed."
- March 1992, as Johnson recalled, "The movement we now call the Wedge made its public debut at a conference of scientists and philosophers held at Southern Methodist University in March 1992, following the publication of my book Darwin on Trial. The conference brought together as speakers some key Wedge figures, particularly Michael Behe, Stephen Meyer, William Dembski, and myself" to debate "Darwinists, headed by Michael Ruse", on the proposition that "Darwinism and neo-Darwinism [have] an a priori commitment to metaphysical naturalism". He writes "Once it becomes clear that the Darwinian theory rests upon a dogmatic philosophy rather than the weight of the evidence, the way will be open for dissenting opinions to get a fair hearing. In a nutshell, that is the Wedge strategy."
- From 1992 onwards, ID proponents engaged in a schedule of conferences, publication, lectures, mostly at universities, websites, radio and TV appearances, and later blogging and podcasting.
- Mar-Apr 1992, Televangelist James Dobson's newsletter directed his supporters to march down to the school board and demand of Of Pandas and People be used when evolution is taught.
- July 1992, in Scientific American Gould reviewed Johnson's book Darwin on Trial, making no mention of ID.
- 1992 Johnson wrote an anti-naturalistic response, which Scientific American refused to print: Dembski, Behe, Meyer and 36 other anti-evolutionists responded by mass-mailing a copy of it to scientists and biology departments all over the U.S., along with a supporting letter in which they called themselves the "Ad Hoc Origins Committee" and "Scientists Who Question Darwinism"
- January 1993 Johnson wrote claiming that it was wrong for theists to accept evolution (without mentioning ID) "Their position, which I call theistic naturalism, starts from the premise that God refrains from interference with those parts of reality that natural science has staked out as its own territory. ... the fundamental disagreement is not over the age of the earth or the method of creation; it is over whether we owe our existence to a purposeful Creator or a blind materialistic process".
- June 1993, the ID movement met again at Pajaro Dunes in California, organized by Johnson, with participants including Scott Minnich, Michael Behe, Stephen C. Meyer, Jonathan Wells and Dean Kenyon. (Paul Nelson gives list) "and this meeting is generally acknowledged as the birth of the Intelligent Design movement", Behe first presented his ideas about "irreducible complexity"

=== Pandas revised, DI meets ID ===
- 1993 2nd. edition Of Pandas and People published. References to "evolution" and "evolutionists" were changed to "Darwinism" and "Darwinists" to make the distinction between "evolution" which can mean "change in living things over time" and "Darwinism" referring to mutation and natural selection. Chapter 6 Biochemical Similarities was extensively revised by Behe, who added sections on the complex mechanism of blood clotting and on the origin of proteins, introducing Behe's irreducibly complexity argument in all but name. Charles Thaxton's A Word to the Teacher at the end of the book was supplanted by Notes to teachers written by M. D. Hartwig, and S. C. Meyer.
- December 1993, Johnson's Darwin on Trial revised, with minor changes to footnotes, a new section on embryology and an epilogue.
- December 1993 Bruce Chapman, president and founder of the Discovery Institute, noticed an essay in the Wall Street Journal by Meyer about a dispute when biology lecturer Dean H. Kenyon taught intelligent design creationism in introductory classes.
- 1994 the "Origins Resource Association" began a campaign to force creationist doctrines including ID into science classes in Livingston Parish, Louisiana: affects Barbara Forrest who leads resistance.
- 1994 Stephen C. Meyer introduces Bruce Chapman to idea of intelligent design approach to re-establishing spiritual values and getting funding. By 1995 Chapman and George Gilder were negotiating with the Howard Ahmanson family for a grant to set up the CRSC.
- August 1994 "In a pattern that is becoming familiar all over the country, a newly elected school board ..." Plan to purchase thirty copies of Pandas to distribute to science teachers, plus as many additional copies as teachers might request "Also, if local school control comes to pass, as advocated by Texas' new governor George Bush, we can expect creationism to be proposed again in Plano and many other communities in the state."
- November 14, 1994, the WSJ discusses Pandas – Phillip Johnson is reported as believing that "... a bit more candor about the nature of the designer might be in order. 'You're playing Hamlet without Hamlet if you don't say something about that,' he says." To Eugenie Scott, it disguised religion as science, which is of questionable honesty: Johnson agreed that a more explicit expression of the motivation of belief was in order, but countered: "The fact is they're working against enormous prejudice here, and enormous bigotry. And they're vying to put it in terms that the courts and science will allow to exist." On December 5 he wrote to the WSJ stating that scientific organizations and textbooks use "creationism" to mean literal YEC, so it's not dishonest for Pandas to repudiate the label in order to question the "dogmatic philosophy" of evolution "defined in scientific usage as a completely naturalistic system in which God played no discernible part."
- 1995 John Buell FTE fund raising letter "Production of supplemental textbook for biology is already complete. The teachers are now using it in all 50 states. This book Of Pandas and People is favorably influencing the way origins is taught in thousands of public school classrooms." "Our commitment is to see the monopoly of naturalistic curriculum in the schools broken."

=== Theistic realism, DI takes up ID and founds CRSC ===
- "By the mid-1990s Johnson was collaborating with other critics of naturalistic evolution in forming the intelligent-design (ID) movement."
- Abrahamsons get involved with DI
- 1995, Johnson released another book, Reason in the Balance: The Case Against Naturalism in Science, Law and Education, opposing the methodological naturalism of science in which "The Creator belongs to the realm of religion, not scientific investigation", and promoting "theistic realism" which "assumes that the universe and all its creatures were brought into existence for a purpose by God", expecting "this 'fact' of creation to have empirical, observable consequences.
- 1995 Behe's Darwinism, Science or Philosophy? published by the FTE.
- May 1995 " 'The whole point of Darwinism is to explain the world in a way that excludes any role for a Creator,' says Johnson. 'What is being sold in the name of science is a completely naturalistic understanding of reality.' "
  "If scientists are wrong about Darwinism, are they also wrong about the notion of intelligent design? Might not the notion of design be worthy of a second look?
  A new breed of young Evangelical scholars thinks the answer to both questions is yes. They are arguing persuasively that design is not only scientific, but is also the most reasonable explanation for the origin of living things. And they're gaining a hearing." [i.e. Meyer, Dembski: also Paul Nelson and Behe, describes IC]
- Summer 1995 conference titled "The Death of Materialism and the Renewal of Culture", source of CRSC.
- 1996, Behe released his book, Darwin's Black Box.
- August 10, 1996 Center for the Renewal of Science and Culture announced in Discovery Institute Press Release, to examine and confront "materialistic bias in science", "the idea that God is either dead or irrelevant". CRSC "will award research fellowships to scholars, hold conferences, and disseminate research findings among opinionmakers and the general public." Director Stephen Meyer, co-director John G. West working with Phillip Johnson and Michael Behe. 1996-97 full-time Discovery research fellows to be William Dembski, Paul Nelson and Jonathan Wells. Founded "specifically to address the Darwinian controversy in public education" by Discovery Institute president Bruce Chapman, with help from Stephen C. Meyer. At some stage, Charles B. Thaxton and Walter L. Bradley become DI fellows at the CRSC (In 2002 the name was changed to the Center for Science and Culture.)
- August 31, 1996 – In A review of The Battle of the Beginnings: Why Neither Side is Winning the Creation-Evolution Debate by Del Ratzsch, Johnson argues against naturalism in science and its acceptance by theistic evolution, notes Ratzsch's reference to "an 'upper tier; of creationists" who "advance concepts like 'intelligent design' and 'irreducible complexity' as legitimate descriptions of biological reality", and identifies his group as this "upper tier". He states "My colleagues and I speak of 'theistic realism' -- or sometimes, 'mere creation"—as the defining concept of our movement. This means that we affirm that God is objectively real as Creator, and that the reality of God is tangibly recorded in evidence accessible to science, particularly in biology. We avoid the tangled arguments about how or whether to reconcile the Biblical account with the present state of scientific knowledge, because we think these issues can be much more constructively engaged when we have a scientific picture that is not distorted by naturalistic prejudice. If life is not simply matter evolving by natural selection, but is something that had to be designed by a creator who is real, then the nature of that creator, and the possibility of revelation, will become a matter of widespread interest among thoughtful people who are currently being taught that evolutionary science has show God to be a product of the human imagination."
- 1996 "Mere Creation" conference at Biola University in California, organized by CRSC to plan strategy — very important, "a major research conference bringing together scientists and scholars who reject naturalism as an adequate framework for doing science and who seek a common vision of creation united under the rubric of intelligent design." – no actual research, but produced strategy.
- June 24, 1996, Eugenie C. Scott wrote that "phrases like 'intelligent design theory', or 'abrupt appearance theory' are used instead of 'creation science', 'creationism', and related terms. I call this newest stage of antievolutionism 'Neocreationism'."
- 1997 Johnson's Defeating Darwinism by Opening Minds states "God is our true Creator. ... I speak of a God who acted openly and who left his fingerprints all over the evidence. Does such a God really exist, or is he a fantasy like Santa Claus? That is the subject of this book." and "If we understand our own times, we will know that we should affirm the reality of God by challenging the domination of materialism and naturalism in the world of the mind."
- c. 1998 William A. Dembski's The Design Inference and Mere Creation

=== The wedge strategy ===
- c. 1998 DI / CRSC Wedge document leaked February 5, 1999.
- 1999 Johnson speech (does not use term ID) claimed that science when applied to questions of origins means "applied materialistic philosophy" explaining "the whole world and the cosmos ... without any reference to God as the Creator, without any supernatural acts, and on the basis of invariable natural laws that were the same from the beginning", so Darwinian "evolution contradicts not just the Book of Genesis, but every word in the Bible from beginning to end. I have built an intellectual movement in the universities and churches that we call The Wedge. ... the Darwinian theory isn't true. ... where might you get the truth? When I preach from the Bible, as I often do at churches and on Sundays, I don't start with Genesis. I start with John 1:1. In the beginning was the word. In the beginning was intelligence, purpose, and wisdom. The Bible had that right. And the materialist scientists are deluding themselves".
- 1999 Johnson's article The Wedge says his "own writing and speaking represents the sharp edge of the Wedge. I make the first penetration, seeking always only to legitimate a line of inquiry rather than to win a debate", with Behe, Dembski and "a lot more" following into the opening.

== Teach the controversy ==
- 1999 strategies: argue that individual teachers have a constitutional right to present creationist material, and that "evidence against evolution" should be taught in the science classroom as a way to improve teaching and learning. Attempts to teach IC and introduce Pandas. Resources for teachers ... abundantly available from both "creation science ministries" and conservative religious groups.
- 1999 David DeWolf, Stephen C. Meyer and Mark DeForrest coauthored a 40-page booklet, Intelligent Design in Public School Science Curricula: A Legal Guidebook, published by the FTE. It claims Edwards v. Aguillard mandated "teaching a variety of scientific theories about the origins of humankind" subject to a "clear secular intent of enhancing.. science instruction."
- 1999 Skagit County's Burlington-Edison School District finds that for almost 10 years the high-school science teacher Roger DeHart had been omitting state-approved biology textbook teaching on evolution, and using Pandas.
- Aug. 17, 1999, Philip Kitcher, professor of the philosophy of science at Columbia University, in online debate in Slate magazine with Johnson, coins neo-creo: "Enter the neo-creos, scavenging the scientific literature, they take claims out of context and pretend that everything about evolution is controversial. ... But it's all a big con."
- May 10, 2000, DI briefing of Congress, "Scientific Evidence of Intelligent Design and its Implications for Public Policy and Education," also addressed the social, moral, and political consequences of Darwinism. Creation-evolution debate had primarily been active at the state and local level, a new effort to involve Congress, took place as the Senate entered its second week of debate on overhauling federal K-12 education programs. Nancy Pearcey "For Darwinists, religion must give way to a new science-based cosmic myth with the power to bind humans together in a new world order. She then asked what this means for morality and argued that people were right to be concerned that all the above would undercut morality."
- July 2000 Dean Kenyon and David DeWolf of CRSC: Kenyon states "Scientific creationism ... is actually one of the intellectual antecedents of the Intelligent Design movement.
- June 2001 Rick Santorum introduces The Santorum Amendment to "Teach the Controversy" partially written by Johnson (and based on a law journal article written by DI activist David DeWolf) inviting, left out of bill but kept in conference report.
- December 2002 DI lobbying to get ID into Ohio science standards Ohio House Bill 481. Bills all failed, ID excluded by name in the approved standard but it included the phrase "critically analyze aspects of evolutionary theory" used as excuse for the new "teach the controversy" strategy.
- January 2004 Dembski The Design Revolution: Answering the Toughest Questions About Intelligent Design ISBN 0-8308-2375-1 page 22 "Theism, whether Christian, Jewish, or Muslim, holds that God by wisdom created the world. The origin of the world and its subsequent ordering thus result from the designing activity of an intelligent agent, God.
  Naturalism, on the other hand, allows no place for intelligent agency, except at the end of a blind, purposeless, material process."
- 2004 ©. FTE, draft for new version of Pandas, mentions 10th anniversary, authors listed as Michael J. Behe, Percival Davis, William A. Dembski, Dean H. Kenyon, Jonathan Wells. Contents list, preface, notes to teachers, notes to students, epilogue, but no main content.
- March 9, 2004, Ohio State Board of Education approved by majority vote model lesson Critical Analysis of Evolution – Grade 10. Ohio Roundtable reported that a motion to remove the "Critical Analysis" lesson had been defeated: its sponsor had "claimed that the lesson was a 'religious effort, cloaked as science,' even though the lesson contains no religious statements whatsoever." The roundtable added that "It is very IMPORTANT to understand that the lesson contains only the scientific challenge to macroevolution. There is NO religious content and NO promotion of any alternative theories, including intelligent design."
- 2004 Paul Nelson interviewed by a magazine called Touchstone: A Journal of Mere Christianity – "Easily, the biggest challenge facing the ID community is to develop a full-fledged theory of biological design. We don't have such a theory right now, and that's a real problem. Without a theory, it's very hard to know where to direct your research focus. Right now, we've got a bag of powerful intuitions and a handful of notions such as irreducible complexity and specified complexity, but as yet, no general theory of biological design."
- 2004 the school board of Grantsburg, Wisconsin, voted to have ID taught as an alternative to evolution. By late summer 2005 letters urging reversal had been organised by a department of University of Wisconsin–Madison and clergy nationwide, the Clergy Letter Project, resulting in the board largely reversing their decision.
- April 8, 2004 first of the Academic Freedom bills promoting intelligent design passed unanimously by the Alabama Senate. On May 17, 2004, the Alabama House adjourned the 2004 legislative session without voting on the bill, allowing it to lapse. On February 8, 2005, a pair of virtually identical bills were simultaneously introduced in the Alabama Senate and House, again under the description of "The Academic Freedom Act."

== Kitzmiller lawsuit ==
- June 7, 2004, at Dover, Pennsylvania, the Dover Area School District School Board considered a new biology textbook. William Buckingham objected, wanting a textbook that gave a balanced view between creationism and evolution. He subsequently proposed Of Pandas and People, after acrimonious debate it was left off the list on August 2.
- October 4, 2004, Buckingham announced acceptance of 50 donated copies of Pandas. On October 18 the full School Board voted 6–3 to amend the district's curriculum to include intelligent design. Buckingham states a law firm has offered pro bono legal representation.
- December 12, 2004, Phillip Johnson stated in an interview "What the Dover board did is not what I'd recommend. ... Just teach evolution with a recognition that it's controversial ..."
- December 14, 2004, 11 parents, ACLU, Americans United and Pepper Hamilton LLP file lawsuit Kitzmiller v. Dover Area School District, lead plaintiff Tammy Kitzmiller, the mother of a ninth grader in the biology class. On December 20, the District voted for the Thomas More Law Center to represent it pro bono.
- May 2005 Kansas school board hearings led by John Calvert, director of the Kansas office of the Intelligent Design Network, boycotted by mainstream scientists as an "anti-science crusade."
- September 26, 2005 to November 4, 2005, Kitzmiller trial before Judge John E. Jones III
- November 2005 Kansas school board voted 6–4 for new science standards criticising evolution, redefining science, then turned out in elections.
- December 20, 2005, Kitzmiller decision; Judge Jones issued his findings of fact and decision as his 139 page MEMORANDUM OPINION.

== After the Kitzmiller lawsuit ==
- February 2006 Kansas school board voted 6–4 for new standards supporting evolution.
- February 2006 Ohio Governor Bob Taft requests legal review of the state's "teach the controversy" curriculum standards, Ohio State Board of Education members vote 11–4 to drop all of the "teach the controversy".
- Spring 2006 Phillip Johnson states in interview "I also don't think that there is really a theory of intelligent design at the present time to propose as a comparable alternative to the Darwinian theory, which is, whatever errors it might contain, a fully worked out scheme. There is no intelligent design theory that's comparable. Working out a positive theory is the job of the scientific people that we have affiliated with the movement. Some of them are quite convinced that it's doable, but that's for them to prove ... No product is ready for competition in the educational world."
- June 2007 Behe's book The Edge of Evolution: The Search for the Limits of Darwinism, claims that variation for the building blocks of evolution are not due to random mutation in DNA, but instead produced by an intelligent designer. Reiterates argument for irreducible complexity, calculating improbability on 2 or more beneficial mutations happening simultaneously, rather than one by one as evolutionary theory requires.
- 2007, A new biology textbook intended to replace Of Pandas and People, entitled Explore Evolution, is published by Hill House Publishers. The book is authored by Stephen C. Meyer, Scott Minnich and Paul A. Nelson, Jonathan Moneymaker and Ralph Seelke.
- 2007 William A. Dembski and Jonathan Wells rewrote Of Pandas and People as a college textbook, The Design of Life. When asked in a December interview whether his research concluded that God is the Intelligent Designer, Dembski stated "I believe God created the world for a purpose. The Designer of intelligent design is, ultimately, the Christian God."
- April, 2008, the pro-intelligent design movie Expelled: No Intelligence Allowed is debuted.
- May, 2008 a Wall Street Journal article describes the common goal of Academic Freedom bills is to expose more students to articles and videos that undercut evolution, most of which are produced by advocates of intelligent design or Biblical creationism.
- December 2008 an article in Scientific American detailed how "Creationists continue to agitate against the teaching of evolution in public schools, adapting their tactics to match the roadblocks they encounter. Past strategies have included portraying creationism as a credible alternative to evolution and disguising it under the name "intelligent design." Other tactics misrepresent evolution as scientifically controversial and pretend that advocates for teaching creationism are defending academic freedom. "Academic freedom" was the creationist catchphrase of choice in 2008 ... the Discovery Institute subsequently retreated to a strategy to undermine the teaching of evolution, introducing a flurry of labels and slogans—"teach the controversy," "critical analysis" and "academic freedom"—to promote its version of the fallback strategy ... despite the lofty language, the ulterior intent and likely effect of these bills are evident: undermining the teaching of evolution in public schools."

== See also ==
- Freiler v. Tangipahoa Parish Board of Education
- Selman v. Cobb County School District
