= Biochemical Predestination =

1969 book by Dean H. Kenyon and Gary Steinman

- Author: Dean H. Kenyon and Gary Steinman
- Language: English
- Subject: Biochemical origin
- Genre: Probability theory
- Publisher: McGraw Hill Text
- Publication date: January 1969
- Publication place: United States

Biochemical Predestination is a 1969 book by Dean H. Kenyon and Gary Steinman which argued in support of biochemical evolution.

In the book, Kenyon and Steinman conclude that "Life might have been biochemically predestined by the properties of attraction that exist between its chemical parts, especially between amino acids in proteins." They argued that life originated with the chemical properties of amino acids causing them to be attracted to each other, forming long protein chains, most important in every living cell. Kenyon believed that proteins were directly formed by attraction between amino acids without DNA coding, and that these were derivatives from non-living raw chemicals in a conducive environment.

In 1976 Kenyon was persuaded by the young Earth creationist arguments of A. E. Wilder-Smith. In the 1982 foreword he wrote to What Is Creation Science? by Henry M. Morris and Gary Parker, Kenyon said that he no longer accepted the pro-evolution arguments in Biochemical Predestination. At the Edwards v. Aguillard trial he provided an affidavit in support of creation science and noted the book as one of his publications. In 1989 Kenyon became a co-author of Of Pandas and People which rebranded creation science as intelligent design.

== Analysis ==
The theory propounded was summarized by Stephen Berry, a chemist; "describing the following causal chain: the properties of the chemical elements dictate the types of monomers that can be formed in prebiotic syntheses, which then dictate the properties of the occurring polymers, which finally dictate the properties of the first eobionts and all succeeding cells." Kenyon's work was about virus production. Intelligent design proponent Stephen C. Meyer says that the book provided a new approach which came to be known as "Self-organization".

"Then in 1976, a student gave me a book by A. E. Wilder-Smith, '"The Creation of Life: a Cybernetic Approach to Evolution". Many pages of that book deal with arguments against Biochemical Predentination, and I found myself hard-pressed to come up with a counter-rebuttal." (D.H. Kenyon)

Kenyon began to doubt his theory in the mid-1970s after a student posed the question to him as to how the first proteins could have been assembled without specific genetic instructions. On a fellowship at the Graduate Theological Union in Berkeley during the 1969–1970 academic year, he reviewed literature on the relationship of science and religion. He began to rethink his Christian faith, and explored the topic further in a 1974 sabbatical at the University of Oxford. In 1976, a student gave him a book by the young Earth creationist A. E. Wilder-Smith, and "Eventually, several other books and articles by neo-creationists came to my attention. I read some of Henry Morris’ books, in particular, The Genesis Flood. I'm not a geologist, and I don't agree with everything in that book, but what stood out was that here was a scientific statement giving a very different view of earth history. Though the book doesn't deal with the subject of the origin of life per se, it had the effect of suggesting that it is possible to have a rational alternative explanation of the past." In 1976 he wrote a new section for Morris and Whitcomb's The Genesis Flood: The Biblical Record and Its Scientific Implications. In the 1982 foreword he wrote to What Is Creation Science? by Morris and Gary Parker, Kenyon said that he no longer accepted the pro-evolution arguments in Biochemical Predestination. At the Edwards v. Aguillard trial he provided an affidavit in support of creation science and noted the book as one of his publications. Kenyon subsequently became a co-author of Of Pandas and People which rebranded creation science as intelligent design.
