= Dean H. Kenyon =

American biologist and author

Dean Kenyon
- Born: 1939 (age 86–87); United States
- Education: University of Chicago (BS); Stanford University (PhD)
- Occupation: Biology professor
- Scientific career
- Fields: Biophysics
- Institutions: San Francisco State University
- Thesis: Photochemistry of DL-phenylalanine (1964)
- Doctoral advisor: Marsden Scott Blois
- Other academic advisors: Melvin Calvin

Dean H. Kenyon (born 1939) is an American biophysicist and professor emeritus of biology at San Francisco State University. He is a young Earth creationist and one of the proponents of the intelligent design movement. He is the author of the 1969 book Biochemical Predestination.

Kenyon became a creationist around 1976, and gave testimony defending creation science during the court cases McLean v. Arkansas and Edwards v. Aguillard. During the latter case, he co-authored the creation science supplementary textbook Of Pandas and People. The case decision went against teaching creation science in public schools, and the authors then altered all references to creationism to refer to intelligent design before the book was published in 1989. He subsequently became a fellow of the Discovery Institute, and continued to endorse young Earth creationism.

== Biography ==
=== Education ===
Kenyon graduated with honors from the University of Chicago with a Bachelor of Science in physics in 1961 as a member of Phi Beta Kappa. As an undergraduate, he developed an interest in origin of life research after attending the Darwin Centennial Celebration in 1959. He then earned his Ph.D. in biophysics from Stanford University in 1965. His doctoral dissertation was titled, "Photochemistry of DL-phenylalanine". After receiving his doctorate, he completed research as a postdoctoral fellow of the National Science Foundation in chemical biodynamics at the University of California, Berkeley, under Nobel laureate Melvin Calvin. He then was a research associate at the Ames Research Center from 1965 to 1966.

=== Career ===
In 1966, Kenyon started as an assistant professor of biology at San Francisco State University and became emeritus in 2001.

In 1969, Kenyon co-authored Biochemical Predestination with Gary Steinman. Chemist Stephen Berry explained Kenyon's and Steinman's theory as "describing the following causal chain: the properties of the chemical elements dictate the types of monomers that can be formed in prebiotic syntheses, which then dictate the properties of the occurring polymers, which finally dictate the properties of the first eobionts and all succeeding cells." Kenyon's work was about virus production.

During the 1969–1970 academic year he was "on a fellowship at the Graduate Theological Union in Berkeley, where he reviewed the contemporary literature on the relationship of science and religion." Then in 1974, he was a visiting scholar to Trinity College, Oxford.

Kenyon states that his views changed around 1976 after exposure to the work of young Earth creationists:

Then in 1976, a student gave me a book by A.E. Wilder-Smith, The Creation of Life: A Cybernetic Approach to Evolution. Many pages of that book deal with arguments against Biochemical Predestination, and I found myself hard-pressed to come up with a counter-rebuttal. Eventually, several other books and articles by neo-creationists came to my attention. I read some of Henry Morris' books, in particular, The Genesis Flood. I'm not a geologist, and I don't agree with everything in that book, but what stood out was that here was a scientific statement giving a very different view of earth history. Though the book doesn't deal with the subject of the origin of life per se, it had the effect of suggesting that it is possible to have a rational alternative explanation of the past.

In 1980, the San Francisco State University Department of Biology had a dispute over Kenyon's presentation of creationism, then called "scientific creationism" in Biology module 337 Evolution. At that time, Kenyon challenged anyone on the faculty to a debate on the merits of evolutionary theory versus "scientific creationism." According to SFSU biology professor John Hafernik, "There was much discussion in faculty meetings as well. Eventually the faculty voted (none opposed, seven abstentions) not to alter the description of Biology 337 to include creationism. The precedent set, in the context of the 1980 discussions, was that the Department did not support teaching creationism."

=== Court cases ===
Kenyon was recruited as an expert in two notable cases about "creation science" during the 1980s.

==== McLean v. Arkansas ====
In 1981, Kenyon was recruited to be an expert witness for the creationist side in the McLean v. Arkansas case that tested the constitutionality of Arkansas' Equal Time Legislation that mandated equal time for "creation science" and "evolution science". Kenyon flew to Arkansas to be deposed and testify during the trial. However, apparently under the influence of creationist attorney Wendell Bird (who was displeased with the defense of the creationist position by the Arkansas attorney general Steve Clark), Kenyon left town just before he was to testify:

The attorney general presented six science witnesses, two more than had testified for the ACLU, presumably on the grounds that quantity made up for evident lack of quality. There would have been more had not a serious case of disappearing witnesses set in as the second week wore on. Dean Kenyon, a biologist from San Francisco State University, fled town after watching the demolition of four of the state's witnesses on day 1 of the second week. And Henry Voss, a computer scientist from California, was rapidly withdrawn at the last minute when, in pretrial deposition, he too began to expound on things satanic and demonical.

The Arkansas attorney general apparently threatened to sue Bird after this interference:

There were other witnesses for the defense who did not show up. Several scientists who had been listed as potential witnesses for the state, backed out because of what Clark termed "peer pressure."

Another state witness, Dr. Dean Kenyon, a biophysicist at San Francisco State University, mysteriously disappeared on the eve of his day in court. He had flown into Little Rock on a Sunday evening, but when one of Clark's assistants went to take his deposition he could not find him. Kenyon had checked out of the hotel and flown back home. Bird had encouraged Kenyon not to testify, although Kenyon taught evolution theory for 16 years until three years ago when he became a creationist. Bird, who is general counsel to Institute for Creation Research, said he attempted to get other defense witnesses not to testify after he perceived the trial as botched by Clark.

Bird said he was not trying to sabotage Clark's effort. He said he merely had told several witnesses for the state that "I don't think you should jeopardize your reputation with the way [the trial] is being handled." Clark stated he was considering legal action against Bird, whose actions, he said, were "tantamount to tampering with justice."

==== Edwards v. Aguillard ====
Following the McLean ruling, which declared the teaching of "creation science" in public schools to be an unconstitutional establishment of religion, Louisiana's version of the "Equal Time" legislation was put to the test. This time, Wendell Bird was deputized by the state and ran the state's defense of the law. Dean Kenyon was advertised as the creationists' lead expert witness, however the case (which eventually became Edwards v. Aguillard when it reached the Supreme Court) was decided by summary judgment, and so never went to a full trial. Nevertheless, in written briefs and in his oral arguments, Bird relied heavily on an expert witness affidavit written by Kenyon. This affidavit is online at the TalkOrigins website. It was entered into evidence in the Kitzmiller case as evidence that Kenyon was explicitly defending "creation science"—and advocating that it be given equal time in public schools and textbooks as the "only" alternative to evolution—while at the same time working on a public school textbook, which eventually became the first "intelligent design" book, Of Pandas and People.

In 1987, in Edwards v. Aguillard the Supreme Court heard a case concerning a Louisiana Law that required "creation science" be taught on an equal basis with evolution in public schools. Anti-creationists argued that this was illegal on the basis that it violated the Establishment Clause of the US Constitution. Kenyon issued an affidavit in that case, stating his support for creationism, and defining it thus:

Creation-science means origin through abrupt appearance in complex form, and includes biological creation, biochemical creation (or chemical creation), and cosmic creation. (...) Creation-science does not include as essential parts the concepts of catastrophism, a world-wide flood, a recent inception of the earth or life, from nothingness (ex nihilo), the concept of kinds, or any concepts from Genesis or other religious texts.

=== Recent work ===
During the Edwards v. Aguillard case, Kenyon was co-authoring with Percival Davis, a creationist school textbook entitled Of Pandas and People, which was published in 1989. After the Edwards decision, all references to "creationism" were replaced with "intelligent design", with a reference to "creationists" being replaced by "design proponents". In the history of creationism, this is the origin of the term intelligent design and the link between creationism and intelligent design.

In October 1992, Kenyon was told by the chair of the SFSU Biology Department to stop teaching creationism in introductory biology courses. He had been teaching creationism and intelligent design "for more than ten years," which received complaints from students and some faculty. Following the Chair's request, the faculty came out in support of Kenyon's academic freedom and ability to teach what he wanted without administration controlling topics. After a hearing, Kenyon "won the right to teach his iconoclastic view of the evolution of life." Kenyon claimed objections to his teaching rested on a positivist view of what constitutes legitimate science.

Following the controversy, Kenyon entered talks with what became the Discovery Institute, including Stephen C. Meyer, Phillip E. Johnson, William Dembski and Michael Behe. He then became a Fellow of the Discovery Institute, which he remains today. The Institute is the driving force behind the intelligent design movement. In Winter 1996, Kenyon's co-authored paper, "The RNA World: A Critique," appeared in Origins and Design, a now defunct creationist journal where he was on the Editorial Advisory Board. He continued publicly arguing in favor of creationism, notably at the 1998 International Conference on Creationism. Currently, Kenyon is a speaker, writer, and board member for the Kolbe Center, a Catholic YEC group. In 2008, Kenyon endorsed a young Earth creationist book promoted by the Center.

== Works by Kenyon ==
- Kenyon DH, Steinman G. Biochemical Predestination. McGraw Hill Text (1969) ISBN 0-07-034126-5.
- Davis PW, Kenyon DH. Of Pandas and People: The Central Question of Biological Origins. Foundation for Thought & Ethics; 2nd edition (1993) ISBN 0-914513-40-0.
- Steinman, G; Kenyon, DH; Calvin, M (August 1966). "The mechanism and protobiochemical relevance of dicyanamide-medicated peptide synthesis". Biochim. Biophys. Acta. 124: 339–50. PMID 5968904.
- Smith, AE; Kenyon, DH (1972). "Is life originating de novo?". Perspect. Biol. Med. 15: 529–42. PMID 5040075.
- Smith, AE; Kenyon, DH (July 1972). "The origin of viruses from cellular genetic material". Enzymologia. 43: 13–8. PMID 5050651.
- Smith, AE; Kenyon, DH (1973). "A unifying concept of carcinogenesis and its therapeutic implications". Oncology. 27 (5): 459–79. PMID 4578174.
- Smith, AE; Kenyon, DH (January 1973). "Acupuncture and A.T.P.: how they may be related". Am J Chin Med (Gard City N Y). 1: 91–7. PMID 4774360.
- Kenyon, DH (July 1975). "On terminology in origin of life studies". Orig. Life. 6: 447–9. PMID 1187108.
- Nissenbaum, A; Kenyon, DH; Oro, J (December 1975). "On the possible role of organic melanoidin polymers as matrices for prebiotic activity". J. Mol. Evol. 6: 253–70. PMID 1542.
- Kenyon, DH; Nissenbaum, A (April 1976). "Melanoidin and aldocyanoin microspheres: implications for chemical evolution and early precambrian micropaleontology". J. Mol. Evol. 7: 245–51. PMID 778393.
