= Charles Thaxton =

American Christian creationist

Charles B. Thaxton
- Born: 1939 (age 86–87); United States
- Education: Iowa State University (PhD)
- Occupation: Author
- Title: Co-founder of KONOS Connection
- Spouse: Carole Thaxton (m. 1971)
- Website: http://www.konos.org

Charles Burton Thaxton (born 1939) is an American physical chemist. He is a proponent of special creation who went on to become one of the first intelligent design authors.

He was a Fellow of the Discovery Institute's Center for Science and Culture, and is currently a Fellow of the Discovery Institute.

== Biography ==
Thaxton earned his Ph.D. in physical chemistry from Iowa State University in 1970. His doctoral dissertation was titled, "A technique for cooling single crystals below 90 degrees K for X-ray and the crystal structures of dihydrogen hexa-tantalum octadecachloride-6-hydrate, and the photodimer of 1,1-dimethyl 2,5-diphenyl 1-silacyclopentadiene". He went on to complete post-doctorate programs in the history of science at Harvard University and the molecular biology laboratories of Brandeis University.

Thaxton has co-authored several books, including The Mystery of Life's Origin and The Soul of Science. In The Mystery of Life's Origin, Thaxton argues for "Special Creation by a creator beyond the cosmos", and asserts that Special Creation holds "that the source that produced life was intelligent".

He was the editor of the first edition of the intelligent design textbook, Of Pandas and People. The book was featured prominently in Kitzmiller v. Dover Area School District and the sequence of drafts that show the transition between the terms "creation" and "creator" to "design", "designer", and "intelligent design", proved important in the judge's decision.

Thaxton stated that he preferred intelligent design to creationism because he "wasn’t comfortable with the typical vocabulary that for the most part creationists were using because it didn’t express what I was trying to do. They were wanting to bring God into the discussion, and I was wanting to stay within the empirical domain and do what you can do legitimately there".

Thaxton and his wife, Carole Thaxton, founded the "KONOS Academy," which is a private Christian 1-12 school in Tyrone, Georgia, United States. Konos celebrated its 20-year anniversary in December 2021. He also teaches at Charles University in Prague.

== Bibliography ==
- Charles B. Thaxton, Walter L. Bradley, and Roger L. Olsen. The Mystery of Life's Origin: Reassessing Current Theories. (Philosophical Library, January 19, 1984) ISBN 0-8022-2447-4 (Foreword by Dean H. Kenyon)
- Charles Thaxton and Nancy Pearcey. The Soul of Science: Christian Faith and Natural Philosophy. (Crossway Books, Wheaton, Illinois 1994)
- Charles Thaxton, Percival Davis, and Dean H. Kenyon. Of Pandas and People: The Central Question of Biological Origins (Foundation for Thought & Ethics, 1989, 1993)
- Thaxton, Charles; Bradley, Walter; Olsen, Roger; Tour, James; Meyer, Stephen; Wells, Jonathan; Gonzalez, Guillermo; Miller, Brian; Klinghoffer, David (2020). The Mystery of Life's Origin. Discovery Institute. ISBN 978-193659975-2.
