= Nancy Pearcey =

American evangelical author (born 1952)

Nancy Randolph Pearcey (born 1952) is an American evangelical author known for her writings on intelligent design and Christian worldview theory.

== Education ==
Pearcey earned a BA from Iowa State University, an MA in Biblical Studies from Covenant Theological Seminary in St. Louis, Missouri. She also completed additional non-degree study in philosophy at the Institute for Christian Studies in Toronto, Canada and received an honorary doctorate from Cairn University in 2007.

== Career ==
In 1991, Pearcey and Charles Colson founded BreakPoint Radio, a radio show dedicated to bringing Christian apologetics to a popular audience. Pearcey wrote scripts for the show until November 1999. Starting in 1996, Pearcey co-authored a number of Christianity Today columns with Colson, who provided outlines that Pearcey would turn into drafts. Pearcey and Colson published their book How Now Shall We Live? in 1999. Despite maintaining her contract for the book was “for co-authorship, not for ghostwriting” Pearcey was only included in ads and cover designs for the book after extensive negotiations with Tyndale House Publishers.

In the early 2000s, Pearcey was the Francis A. Schaeffer Scholar for several years at the World Journalism Institute.

In September 2007, Pearcey was named Scholar for Worldview Studies at the Center for University Studies at Philadelphia Biblical University, Langhorne, Pennsylvania.[5][6]

In 2011-12 Pearcey was on the faculty at Rivendell Sanctuary. In 2012, she became Scholar in Residence at Houston Christian University. Pearcey is a columnist for the conservative magazine Human Events.

== Views ==
=== Intelligent design ===
Pearcey is a fellow of the Discovery Institute's Center for Science and Culture. She has extensively promoted the intelligent design movement in her writings. Pearcey authored several chapters of the controversial pro-intelligent design textbook Of Pandas and People, which featured prominently in the Kitzmiller v. Dover Area School District trial.

=== Christian Worldview ===
Pearcey is a vocal advocate of the Christian Worldview, which emphasizes the construction of distinctly Christian intellectual frameworks rooted in Biblical inerrancy. Each worldview is defined by its answer to three questions, including natural origins, the source of suffering/the fall, and how humans will be redeemed. These views are mutually exclusive:

"The culture war is not just about abortion, homosexual rights, or the decline of public education. These are only the skirmishes. The real war is a cosmic struggle between worldviews—between the Christian worldview and the various secular and spiritual worldviews arrayed against it. This is what we must understand if we are going to be effective both in evangelizing our world today and in transforming it to reflect the wisdom of the Creator.”

=== Gender ===
Pearcey is an adherent to Complementarianism and distinct gender roles for men and women. She believes the Industrial Revolution disrupted the connection between men and their homes — for example, she argues Women's suffrage "represented a tragic erosion of women’s trust in men to take responsibility for the common good—especially women’s good," stating this trend led to societal atomization and the decline of traditional masculinity. To combat this trend, she argues for renewed interest in the home and conscious de-secularization of Christian masculinity that emphasizes spiritual leadership.

Pearcey is opposed to the Sex–gender distinction, arguing Transgender sexuality "sets up an opposition between the body and the self, estranging people from their basic biological identities as male and female."

== Criticism ==
The BioLogos Foundation has criticized Pearcey for conflating "the scientific theory of biological evolution and the philosophy of materialistic evolutionism" in her work on intelligent design.

== Publications ==
- Pearcey, Nancy Randolph; Colson, Charles (1993), A Dance With Deception: Revealing the Truth Behind the Headlines, Dallas: Word Pub., ISBN 0-8499-3521-0.
- ———; Colson, Charles (1994), A Dangerous Grace: Daily Readings.
- ———; Thaxton, Charles B (1994), The Soul of Science: Christian Faith and Natural Philosophy, Crossway, ISBN 0-89107-766-9.
- ———; Fickett, Harold; Colson, Charles (1999), How Now Shall We Live?, Tyndale House Publishers, ISBN 0-8423-1808-9.
- ——— (2005). Total Truth: Liberating Christianity from Its Cultural Captivity. Wheaton: Crossway Books. ISBN 1-4335-0220-8. ECPA Gold Medallion Book Award 'Christianity and Society' category winner.
- ——— (2010), Saving Leonardo: A Call to Resist the Secular Assault on Mind, Morals, and Meaning, B&H Books, ISBN 978-1-4336-6927-9.
- ——— (2015), Finding Truth: 5 Principles for Unmasking Atheism, Secularism, and Other God Substitutes, David C Cook, ISBN 978-0-7814-1308-4.
- ______ (2018) Love Thy Body: Answering Hard Questions About Life and Sexuality, Baker Books, ISBN 9780801075728.
- ——— (2023). The toxic war on masculinity: how Christianity reconciles the sexes. Grand Rapids, MI: Baker Books, a division of Baker Publishing Group. ISBN 978-0-8010-7573-5.
