= Association of Christian Schools International =

Organization

- Abbreviation: ACSI
- Formation: 1978
- Type: Non-governmental organization
- Purpose: Strengthen Christian schools and equip Christian educators worldwide as they prepare students academically and inspire them to become devoted followers of Jesus Christ.
- Headquarters: Colorado Springs, Colorado, U.S.
- Region served: 108 countries
- Members: 25,000 Christian schools
- President: Larry Taylor
- Staff: 295
- Website: acsi.org

The Association of Christian Schools International (ACSI), founded in 1978, is an international organization of evangelical Christian schools. Its headquarters are in Colorado Springs, Colorado. It offers tiers of oversight, from school accreditation to teacher certificates. Schools and even homeschoolers can also join as members. It is regarded as the largest Protestant educational organization in the world, serving over 5.5 million students globally.

== History ==
ACSI was founded in 1978 through the merger of three associations: The National Christian School Education Association, The Ohio Association of Christian Schools, and the Western Association of Christian Schools. Various international schools have joined the network.

Initially headquartered in La Habra, California, the growing organization moved its main offices to Colorado Springs, Colorado in 1994 to support expanded operations and international outreach. Later that year, ACSI's primary school and secondary school programs became officially recognized by the National Council for Private School Accreditation (NCPSA).

By 2025, it will have 25,000 schools in 108 countries.

== Governance ==
A 36-member Board of Directors, elected by member schools, governs ACSI by providing overall guidance, setting policies, and ensuring the organization stays true to its mission. The current board chair is Elisa Carlson. The board hires and oversees the president and CEO, who manages daily operations and leads the organization's staff. ACSI also operates through regional offices globally and domestically.

== Affiliations ==
The Association of Christian Schools International has historically been a member of the World Evangelical Alliance, but is no longer listed as such. The organization has, however, been a member of the Evangelical Council for Financial Accountability (ECFA) since February 3, 1998, reflecting its commitment to financial transparency.

== Programs ==
The association offers multiple services including accreditation for early-education programs and primary and secondary schools, certification, curriculum and testing products (under the trade name "Purposeful Design Publications"), legal/legislative services, and urban school services.

== Controversies ==
The association was accused of racism in 1987 because the board could have had more diverse representation. The ACSI Board and leadership, as of 2025, has since been more diverse, but right wing commentators have accused it of being woke because of its partnership with UnifiEd.

In 2023, ACSI obtained church status from the IRS. This allows the organization to benefit from certain tax exemptions and protections, such as not needing to file Form 990, which reveals executive salaries, grants, and major expenditures, thus lowering transparency. This comes after the organization experienced a surge in income and the value of its assets. This move proves to be controversial as ACSI does not provide membership for churches.

In 2025, the Pennsylvania State Board of Education unanimously rejected ACSI's application to be recognized as an official accrediting agency under the state's Private Academic Schools Act. ACSI argued that state approval would bolster the credibility and accountability of its work, but legislators raised concerns that the organization's policies on "biblical sexuality" were discriminatory and could harm LGBTQ+ students. ACSI's counsel characterized the denial as religious discrimination, with attorney Randall Wenger stating that ACSI was denied accreditation because it focuses on religious education.

== Lawsuit ==
In Spring 2006, the Association of Christian Schools International sued the University of California system, alleging that the rejection of several Christian science courses was "viewpoint discrimination", which violated the constitutional rights of applicants from Christian schools whose high school coursework is deemed inadequate college preparation. The lawsuit was brought by the parents of six children who had not been rejected from the university. In August 2006, the case Association of Christian Schools International v. Roman Stearns was allowed to proceed against the university while lawsuits against individual school officials were thrown out.

The National Center for Science Education noted, "One of the lawyers representing the plaintiffs is Wendell Bird, a former staff attorney for the Institute for Creation Research. As a special assistant attorney general for Louisiana, he defended the state's 'equal time' law, which was ruled to be unconstitutional in Edwards v. Aguillard". The National Center for Science Education works in collaboration with National Academy of Sciences, the National Association of Biology Teachers and the National Science Teachers Association, which consider creationism and intelligent design to be pseudoscience.

The Association retained leading intelligent design proponent Michael Behe to testify in the case as an expert witness. Behe's expert witness report claimed that the Christian textbooks were excellent works for high school students, and he defended that view in a deposition.

On March 28, 2008, the defendants won a legal victory when their motion for partial summary judgment was granted, and the plaintiffs' motion for summary judgment was denied. On August 8, 2008, Judge Otero entered summary judgment against plaintiff ACSI.
