= Walter Bradley (engineer) =

American professor and intelligent design advocate (born 1943)

Walter L. Bradley
- Born: December 27, 1943
- Died: July 2, 2025 (aged 81)
- Education: University of Texas at Austin
- Scientific career
- Workplaces: Colorado School of Mines; École Polytechnique Fédérale de Lausanne; Texas A&M University; Baylor University

Walter L. Bradley was a retired professor of engineering, old Earth creationist and an advocate of intelligent design.

== Academic career ==
Bradley taught mechanical engineering at Texas A&M University. He was a professor at Baylor University a private Baptist college in Waco, Texas.

== Intelligent design ==
Bradley was the co-author, along with Roger Olsen and Charles Thaxton, of The Mystery of Life's Origin: Reassessing Current Theories. This book, published in 1984, presents a creationist interpretation of abiogenesis, attributing it to "Special Creation by a creator beyond the cosmos", and says that Special Creation holds "that the source that produced life was intelligent". William Dembski has described Bradley as one of the originators of the intelligent design movement, and the book as seminal in the ID movement.

Bradley was one of the pioneers of the concept of intelligent design, attempting to explain topics not yet understood by science as the activity of God. Bradley's writings on the subject anticipated some of the concepts later articulated by William Dembski and Michael Behe, and he was a participant in early meetings regarding the wedge strategy, a religious public relations campaign with a goal of reshaping American culture to adopt evangelical Protestant values.

As of 2007, Bradley was on the selection committee for the Trotter Prize, which rewards work on intelligent design.
