= Freiler v. Tangipahoa Parish Board of Education =

1997 court case in Louisiana

- Court: United States Court of Appeals for the Fifth Circuit
- Full case name: Herb Freiler; Sam Smith, Individually and in his capacity as Administrator of the Estate of his minor child Steven Smith; John Jones v. Tangipahoa Parish Board of Education; E.F. Bailey; Robert Caves; Maxine Dixon; Leroy Hart; Ruth Watson; Donnie Williams, Sr.; Art Zieske, Individually and in their capacities as members of the School Board; Ted Cason, Individually and in his capacity as Superintendent of Schools
- Decided: August 13, 1999
- Citation: 185 F.3d 337

Case history
- Subsequent history: Petition for rehearing en banc denied, 201 F.3d 602 (5th Cir. 2000); Certiorari denied, 530 U.S. 1251 (2000)

Court membership
- Judges sitting: Carolyn Dineen King, Henry Anthony Politz, Fortunato Benavides

Case opinions
- Majority: Benavides, joined by a unanimous court

Laws applied
- U.S. Const. amend. I

Keywords
- Evolution

Freiler v. Tangipahoa Parish Board of Education, 185 F.3d 337 (5th Cir. 1999) was United States federal court case on the constitutionality of a policy requiring teachers to read aloud a disclaimer whenever they taught about evolution.

In 1987 the Supreme Court of the United States ruled in the case of Edwards v. Aguillard (482 U.S. 587) that the teaching of "creation science" constituted an establishment of religion and thus violated the Establishment Clause of the U.S. Constitution.

In April 1994 the School Board of Tangipahoa, Louisiana, adopted a policy mandating that a disclaimer was to be presented before any discussion of evolutionary biology. The policy was as follows:

Whenever, in classes of elementary or high school, the scientific theory of evolution is to be presented, whether from textbook, workbook, pamphlet, other written material, or oral presentation the following statement shall be quoted immediately before the unit of study begins as a disclaimer from endorsement of such theory.

"It is hereby recognized by the Tangipahoa Parish Board of Education, that the lesson to be presented, regarding the origin of life and matter, is known as the Scientific Theory of Evolution and should be presented to inform students of the scientific concept and not intended to influence or dissuade the Biblical version of Creation or any other concept.

It is further recognized by the Board of Education that it is the basic right and privilege of each student to form his/her own opinion or maintain beliefs taught by parents on this very important matter of the origin of life and matter. Students are urged to exercise critical thinking and gather all information possible and closely examine each alternative toward forming an opinion."

Parents sued the school board for violating the Establishment Clause of the U.S. Constitution and won in 1997 in the U.S. District Court for the Eastern District of Louisiana. The schoolboard appealed and the decision was upheld by the United States Court of Appeals for the Fifth Circuit on January 24, 2000.

The schoolboard then appealed to the Supreme Court of the United States, who on June 19, 2000, declined to hear the case in a 6–3 decision, thereby allowing the lower court decision to stand. Three conservative members of the Supreme Court dissented; Antonin Scalia and William Rehnquist, who had also dissented from the decision in Edwards v. Aguillard, were joined by 1991 George H. W. Bush appointee Clarence Thomas.

== See also ==
- Kitzmiller v. Dover Area School District, a 2005 case finding a similar disclaimer unconstitutional.
