= Foundation for Thought and Ethics =

American non-profit organization

The Foundation for Thought and Ethics (FTE) was a Christian non-profit organization based in Richardson, Texas, and self-described "Christian think tank". It published textbooks and articles promoting creation science and intelligent design, abstinence, and Christian nationalism. In addition, the foundation's officers and editors became some of the leading proponents of intelligent design. The FTE developed close associations with the Discovery Institute, hub of the intelligent design movement and other religious Christian groups. The FTE operated from 1981 to 2016. Foundation for Thought and Ethics Books is now listed as an imprint of Discovery Institute Press. From the outset its aim was to develop a "scientific critique" of evolution, which was published as The Mystery of Life's Origin in 1984, to be followed by "a two-model high school biology textbook".

The FTE is best known for publishing the textbook Of Pandas and People in 1989, an attempt to relabel creationism and introduce it into public school science classrooms by raising questions about evolution while presenting intelligent design as an alternative. The book played a significant part in the court case Kitzmiller v. Dover Area School District, known as the 'Dover Trial,' the first direct challenge brought in United States federal courts against a public school district which tried to mandate the teaching of intelligent design as an alternative to evolution.

While FTE did not become a party, Jon A. Buell, the president of FTE testified on July 14, 2005 at the Dover pretrial hearings. Buell denied having known about actions of the Thomas More Law Center to which the Judge said it "strains credulity." In the case, the plaintiffs successfully argued that intelligent design was a form of creationism, and thus it was ruled unconstitutional to teach in public schools.

== Mission ==
FTE was founded in December 1980, and in 1981 its Internal Revenue Service filing included a document headed "What is the Foundation for Thought and Ethics?" describing its aims:

The Foundation for Thought and Ethics has been established to introduce biblical perspective into the mainstream of America's humanistic society, confronting the secular thought of modern man with the truth of God's Word.

They outlined their first two projects:

[The] first project is a rigorous scientific critique of the theory of prebiotic evolution. Next, we will develop a two-model high school biology textbook that will fairly and impartially view the scientific evidences for creation side by side with evolution. (In this case Scripture or even religious doctrine would violate the separation of church and state.)

The foundation described its mission on its website as:

"The purpose of FTE is to restore the freedom to know to young people, especially in matters of worldview, morality, and conscience, and to return the right of informed consent to families in the education of their children."

A previous statement described the foundation's mission as "proclaiming, publishing, preaching [and] teaching…the Christian Gospel and understanding of the Bible and the light it sheds on the academic and social issues of the day."

In its publication The Foundation of Rationale, written in 1983 by Charles B. Thaxton and Jon A. Buell, the FTE argued not only that creationism should be taught, but also that teaching evolution undermined the moral values and the religious beliefs of young students:

"Many of the same Christian parents, however, are not concerned about the teaching of evolution in public schools. Falling SAT scores and increasing drug abuse, violence, abortion, and homosexual activity are the concerns of these parents. 'Why the fuss about creation being taught in public schools anyway?' they ask. As we shall show, there line of reasoning which usually lies hidden when either the subject of origins or morality is discussed, but which actually ties the two concerns together. Once this reasoning is understood it becomes evident that not only does the exclusive teaching of evolution encourage our children's rejection of Judeo-Christian morality, but it also prepares young minds for the reception of religious view which these same parents find unacceptable."

Critics argue the foundation's publications are vehicles to promote Christian faith through veiled wording.

== Organization, funding, and revenues ==
The foundation is a 501(c)(3) non-profit organization headed by Jon A. Buell, its founder and President. Former intelligent design proponent and Discovery Institute Senior Fellow William A. Dembski has served as the foundation's Academic Editor.

According to the foundation's 2004 federal tax filing, the majority of the foundation's income, $382,865, was in the form of donations, "direct public support," with sales of textbooks and video tapes providing $23,539 of net income.

== Publications ==
- Cole DD, Duran MG. Sex and Character. 1998: Haughton publishing Company, ISBN 0-914513-50-8.
- Amos G, Gardiner R. Never Before In History. 1998: Haughton Publishing Company, ISBN 0-914513-51-6.
- Davis P, Kenyon DH, Thaxton CB. Of Pandas and People 1999; Haughton Publishing Company, 4th ed. (ISBN 0-914513-40-0).
- Phillip E. Johnson. Darwinism: Science or Philosophy?, July 1994, ISBN 0-9642104-0-1
- William A. Dembski, Jonathan Wells, The Design of Life (third edition of Of Pandas and People), November 19, 2007, ISBN 0-9800213-0-8
- David K. DeWolf, Stephen C. Meyer, and Mark E. DeForrest. Intelligent Design in Public School Science Curriculum: A Legal Guidebook. Foundation for Thought and Ethics, 1999. ISBN 0-9642104-1-X
