= Of Pandas and People =

Creationist supplementary textbook

Of Pandas and People: The Central Question of Biological Origins
- Cover of the 1993 second edition
- Authors: Percival Davis and Dean H. Kenyon, edited by Charles Thaxton (1st & 2nd Ed); William A. Dembski and Jonathan Wells (3rd Ed, under the title The Design of Life)
- Language: English
- Subject: Intelligent design
- Publisher: Foundation for Thought and Ethics
- Publication date: 1989
- Publication place: United States
- Media type: Print (Hardcover)
- Pages: 170
- ISBN: 0-914513-40-0
- OCLC: 27973099
- Dewey Decimal: 576.8 21
- LC Class: QH367.3 .D38 1993

Of Pandas and People: The Central Question of Biological Origins is a controversial 1989 (2nd edition 1993) school-level supplementary textbook written by Percival Davis and Dean H. Kenyon, edited by Charles Thaxton and published by the Texas-based Foundation for Thought and Ethics (FTE). The textbook endorses the pseudoscientific (Note: National Science Teachers Association, a professional association of 55,000 science teachers and administrators in a 2005 press release: "We stand with the nation's leading scientific organizations and scientists, including Dr. John Marburger, the president's top science advisor, in stating that intelligent design is not science.…It is simply not fair to present pseudoscience to students in the science classroom.") notion of intelligent design – the argument that life shows evidence of being designed by an intelligent agent. Although this agent is not named specifically in the book, proponents understand that it refers to the Christian God. (Note: "Aquinas was explicit that this intelligent designer 'everyone understands to be God.'"; "anyone familiar with Western religious thought would immediately make the association that the tactically unnamed designer is God", Kitzmiller v. Dover Area School District, p25, citing the testimony of John Haught; "Moreover, it is notable that both Professors Behe and Minnich admitted their personal view is that the designer is God and Professor Minnich testified that he understands many leading advocates of ID to believe the designer to be God.", "...although, as one of them [design theorists] confessed to some fellow Christians, referring to an intelligent was merely a 'politically correct way to refer to God.") They present various polemical arguments against the scientific theory of evolution. Before publication, early drafts used cognates of "creationist". After the Edwards v. Aguillard Supreme Court ruling that creationism is religion and not science, these were changed to refer to "intelligent design".

The overview chapter was written by young Earth creationist Nancy Pearcey. The second edition published in 1993 included a contribution written by Michael Behe. A third edition of the book was published in 2007 under the title The Design of Life: Discovering Signs of Intelligence in Biological Systems.

The book argues that the origin of new organisms is "in an immaterial cause: in a blueprint, a plan, a pattern, devised by an intelligent agent". The text remains non-committal on the age of the Earth, commenting that some "take the view that the earth's history can be compressed into a framework of thousands of years, while others adhere to the standard old earth chronology". The book raises a number of objections to the theory of evolution, such as the alleged lack of transitional fossils, gaps in the fossil record and the apparent sudden appearance ex nihilo of "already intact fish with fins and scales, birds with feathers, beaks, and wings, etc". The book makes no explicit reference to the identity of the intelligent designer implied in the "blueprint" metaphor.

In 1989 the National Center for Science Education published three reviews of the book: Kevin Padian, a biologist at University of California, Berkeley, called it "a wholesale distortion of modern biology". Michael Ruse, a professor of philosophy and biology, said the book was "worthless and dishonest". In the third of these reviews, Gerald Skoog, Professor of Education at Texas Tech University, wrote that the book reflected a creationist strategy to focus their "attack on evolution", interpreting the Edwards v. Aguillard ruling as though it legitimized "teaching a variety of scientific theories", but the book did not contain a scientific theory or model to "balance" against evolution, and was "being used as a vehicle to advance sectarian tenets and not to improve science education".

== Editions ==
There are currently two editions of the book, the 1989 first edition edited by Charles Thaxton, a chemist who earned his PhD in physical chemistry from Iowa State University, and the 1993 second edition, which included a "Note to Teachers" by Mark D. Hartwig and Stephen C. Meyer. A third edition was retitled The Design of Life. Jon Buell, the president of the Foundation for Thought and Ethics, said that the ruling in Kitzmiller v. Dover Area School District that intelligent design was religious would make the textbook "radioactive" in public schools and would be "catastrophic" for the marketability of both the (then) present (second) edition and the (then) forthcoming third edition, citing possible losses of around US$500,000. The renaming of the book is viewed by some as way of mitigating this and at the same time distancing the book from past controversy.

For the 1993 edition, Michael Behe wrote a chapter on blood clotting, presenting arguments which he later presented in very similar terms as "irreducible complexity" in a chapter in his 1996 book Darwin's Black Box. Behe later agreed that they were essentially the same when he defended intelligent design at the Dover trial.

== Origins and publication ==
The book is published by the Foundation for Thought and Ethics (FTE), a non-profit organization founded by ordained minister Jon Buell in Richardson, Texas, in 1980 as a tax-exempt charitable and educational organization, with articles of incorporation which stated that its purpose includes "proclaiming, publishing, preaching [and] teaching…the Christian Gospel and understanding of the Bible and the light it sheds on the academic and social issues of the day". In the original Internal Revenue Service tax-exemption submission, Buell described the foundation as a "Christian think-tank" and stated that the organization's first activity would be the editing of a book "showing the scientific evidence for creation". Co-author Percival Davis later acknowledged that religious concerns underlay the writing of the book; in a November 1994 interview with The Wall Street Journal, he commented: "Of course my motives were religious. There's no question about it." (Note: "About his reasons for writing 'Pandas', Davis told The Wall Street Journal in 1994: 'Of course my motives were religious. There's no question about it'.")

=== Creation Biology ===
In 1981, the FTE advertised in a creationist newspaper, seeking authors for a textbook that would be "sensitively written to present both evolution and creation". Their first production was Unlocking the secrets: The Mystery of Life's Origin by creationist Charles Thaxton (a chemist), Walter L. Bradley, and Roger L. Olsen. In this book, Thaxton presented arguments for "Special Creation by a creator beyond the cosmos", and described Special Creation as holding "that the source that produced life was intelligent".

Thaxton approached Dean H. Kenyon to write the foreword. When Mystery was ready to go to the printers late in 1982, work began on the textbook, written by Kenyon and Percival Davis with Thaxton as editor.

A draft dated 1983 was entitled Creation Biology Textbook Supplements, and was stated in the language of creationism, including the following statement:

The basic metabolic pathways of nearly all organisms are the same. Is this because of descent from a common ancestor, or because only these pathways (and their variations) can sustain life? Evolutionists think the former is correct; creationists because of all the evidence discussed in this book, conclude the latter is correct.

A 1986 draft with the title Biology and Creation included a similar statement, and defined "creation" using the classic creationist concept of "abrupt appearance":

Creation means that the various forms of life began abruptly through the agency of an intelligent creator with their distinctive features already intact. Fish with fins and scales, birds with feathers, beaks, and wings, etc.

A 1987 draft entitled Biology and Origins made only minor grammatical alterations to these statements. The FTE sought a publisher for the book, sending a Boston firm a prospectus which indicated that the draft had been sent to school districts for testing as well as to prospective publishers. In the prospectus, Buell stated that a "new independent scientific poll... shows almost half of the nation's biology teachers include some creation in their view of biological origins. Many more who don't still believe it should be included in science curriculum." Additionally, he enclosed projections showing expected revenue of over $6.5 million in five years based upon "modest expectations for the market." If creationist teaching in schools was explicitly permitted by the Supreme Court of the United States in the Louisiana "Balanced Treatment Act" case that was then ongoing, the FTE's founder Jon Buell wrote that "you can throw out these projections, the nationwide market would be explosive!"

=== From creationism to intelligent design: Pandas and "cdesign proponentsists" ===
The Louisiana "Balanced Treatment Act" case – Edwards v. Aguillard – was decided by the Supreme Court in 1987. The court determined that teaching creationism in public schools violated the Establishment Clause of the United States Constitution, but that alternative scientific theories could be taught. While the decision ruled out any return to teaching traditional Young Earth creationism in science classes, it did offer an opening for those willing to recast creationist doctrine in the language of science.

In 1987 a further draft of the book was produced with the new title Of Pandas and People, which still had the definition "creation means that various forms of life began abruptly", and used the term "creationists":

The basic metabolic pathways (reaction chains) of nearly all organisms are the same. Is this because of descent from a common ancestor, or because only these pathways (and their variations) can sustain life? Evolutionists think the former is correct, creationists accept the latter view.

The outcome of the case prompted significant editorial changes to the book. Dean H. Kenyon had presented an affidavit to the court in which he defined "creation science" as meaning "origin through abrupt appearance in complex form", which did "not include as essential parts... catastrophism, a world-wide flood, a recent inception of the earth or life,... the concept of kinds, or any concepts from Genesis or other religious texts", but this attempt to re-define creation science did not succeed in the Edwards case. Both authors had previously written young Earth creationist publications referring to biological design: a 1967 book co-written by Percival Davis referred to "design according to which basic organisms were created", and in a 1984 article as well as in his affidavit to Edwards v. Aguillard, Kenyon defended creation science by stating that "biomolecular systems require intelligent design and engineering know-how". According to the Discovery Institute's account published in December 2005, Charles Thaxton as editor of the Pandas book needed a new term after the Supreme Court case, and found it in a phrase he "picked up from a NASA scientist – intelligent design". He thought: "That's just what I need, it's a good engineering term….. it seemed to jibe... And I went back through my old copies of Science magazine and found the term used occasionally." In a new draft of Pandas prepared shortly after the 1987 Supreme Court ruling, approximately 150 uses of the root word "creation", such as "creationism" and "creationist", were systematically changed to refer to intelligent design. The definition remained essentially the same, with "intelligent design" substituted for "creation", and "intelligent creator" changed to "intelligent agency":

Intelligent design means that various forms of life began abruptly through an intelligent agency, with their distinctive features already intact. Fish with fins and scales, birds with feathers, beaks, wings, etc.

The term "creationists" was changed to "design proponents", but in one case the beginning and end of the original word "creationists" were accidentally retained, so that "creationists" became "cdesign proponentsists".

The basic metabolic pathways (reaction chains) of nearly all organisms are the same. Is this because of descent from a common ancestor, or because only these pathways (and their variations) can sustain life? Evolutionists think the former is correct, cdesign proponentsists accept the latter view.

FTE founder Jon Buell says that the word creationism was a "placeholder term" whose definition "changed to include a religious context after the draft was written, so the writers changed the word." However, the proof that intelligent design was creationism re-labeled played a significant part in Kitzmiller v. Dover Area School District, and "cdesign proponentsists" has been described as "the missing link between creationism and intelligent design."

=== Publication and promotion ===
Of Pandas and People was published in 1989 by "Haughton Publishing Co." This was the assumed name of a Mesquite, Texas, printing firm, Horticultural Printers, Inc., which mainly served the agricultural industry and had no other books in print, nor any in-house writers or science advisors. (It should not be confused with the well-known children's and school textbook publisher, Houghton Mifflin). Printing costs were met by donations to the FTE, whose members were told in a December 1988 fundraising letter that donors would receive an enameled box with a panda on the lid as a gift. The box would "become a pleasant reminder to pray for our work", as Buell put it.

Following the book's publication in 1989, the FTE embarked on a lengthy campaign to get the book into use in schools across the United States. Previous creationist efforts to dilute or overturn the teaching of evolutionary theory had relied largely on a "top-down" approach of pro-creationist legislators passing laws to regulate science education in schools. However, these had repeatedly failed to survive court challenges. The FTE took a "bottom-up" approach instead, mobilizing local Christian conservative groups to push school boards and individual teachers to adopt the book and also to get themselves elected to school boards and local educational committees.

Buell told supporters:

Biology teachers are generally easy to contact, available for a meeting on short notice, and receptive. If you would like to be a part of this 'quiet army', please let us know right away. Those choosing not to enlist may wish to support those who do by their prayers.

The FTE provided publicity materials to its supporters to assist them in promoting the adoption of the book. These included a video of testimonials by pro-ID scientists and a promotional script, including "lines to take" on contentious issues.

For instance, on the controversial issue of ID's perceived overlap with religion, the FTE's suggested response read:

I agree that personal beliefs should not be taught in science classrooms, but intelligent design is not a personal belief; it is accepted science, a view that is held by many highly qualified scientists.

The FTE was aided in this effort by "traditional" creationist organizations such as the Institute for Creation Research, which sells Of Pandas and People through its own online shop and catalogue. The book was explicitly marketed by retailers as a creationist work; in the 2005 Kitzmiller v. Dover Area School District case, donated copies of the book were accompanied by a catalog which listed Pandas under "creation science".

== The Design of Life ==
Discovery Institute Senior Fellows William A. Dembski and Jonathan Wells are the listed authors of this edition, presented as a sequel. The preface of The Design of Life is by Jon A. Buell, president of the Foundation for Thought and Ethics, which is the publisher of The Design of Life.

The book tries to address some novel areas. For example, it states that intelligent design does not require miracles or the supernatural, but still does not rely on "materialistic explanations". The book states that "Supernatural explanations invoke miracles and therefore are not properly part of science", and that "[e]xplanations that call on intelligent causes require no miracles but cannot be reduced to materialistic explanations." It includes 100 pages of footnotes and notes.

Also, the book tries to explain away the loss of intelligent design in the Kitzmiller v. Dover decision: "In the end, not any court rulings or public policies or Hollywood films, will decide the merit of intelligent design."

A blog associated with the book began on December 17, 2007.

=== Reception ===
Dembski wrote in his blog, Uncommondescent, that The Design of Life had 9 five star reviews, and only a single one star review on Amazon.com on December 5, 2007. California State University emeritus professor Mark Perakh has written that he believes Dembski and his associates at the Discovery Institute are deceitfully manipulating the Amazon.com review system to promote their own work and denigrate the work of their adversaries.

The Discovery Institute's blog, Evolution News and Views, also gave the book a positive. Evolution News and Views says that The Design of Life describes how evolution cannot account for the necks of giraffes, how the transition from reptiles to mammals took place, how whales evolved from land animals, and how all evolutionary explanations of the bacterial flagellum are fallacious. In addition, the review asserts that this book exposes substantial holes in abiogenesis and common descent, as well as refuting SETI objections to intelligent design and discussions of the shortcomings of ocular design.

Dembski was interviewed about the book by Focus on the Family's Citizenlink in December, 2007. Dembski described the book as accessible, but noted that it also includes a CD and endnotes that delve deeper into the technical issues. Dembski said the book corrects many of the misrepresentations and biased descriptions of intelligent design that have appeared. Dembski also revealed that he believes that the "intelligent designer" is the Christian God.

== Analysis ==
Many of the book's arguments are identical to those raised by creationists, which have been dismissed by the scientific community. A comparison of an early draft of Of Pandas and People to a later 1987 draft showed how in hundreds of instances the word "creationism" had been replaced by "intelligent design" and "creationist" replaced by "intelligent design proponent", while "creator" was replaced by "agency" or "designer". In his 2007 book Monkey Girl Edward Humes describes how this change was made after Edwards v. Aguillard settled that teaching "Creation Science" in public schools was unconstitutional.

Scientific and education professional groups have strongly criticized Of Pandas and People and have opposed its use in schools. Science educator Gerald Skoog described it as "a vehicle to advance sectarian tenets and not to improve science education" and said "This book has no potential to improve science education and student understanding of the natural world."

A review of Of Pandas and People by paleontologist Kevin Padian of the University of California at Berkeley for the National Center for Science Education's Bookwatch Reviews in 1989 called the book a "wholesale distortion of modern biology", and says that FTE's writers had misrepresented such topics as the Cambrian explosion, the history of birds, and the concept of homology. Padian described the treatment of homology in Of Pandas and People as "shameful", citing:

They pretend that the Tasmanian wolf, a marsupial, would be placed [classified] with the placental wolf if evolutionists were not so hung up on the single character of their reproductive mode by which marsupials and placentals are traditionally separated. This is a complete falsehood, as anyone with access to the evidence knows. It is not a matter of a single reproductive character, but dozens of characters in the skull, teeth, post-cranial bones (including the marsupial pelvic bones), soft anatomy, and biochemistry, to say nothing of their respective fossil records, that separate the two mammals. About the closest similarity they have going for them is that they are both called "wolf" in English. The same criticism can be applied seriatim to the authors' mystifying discussion of the red and giant "pandas".

Padian's conclusion was: "It is hard to say what is worst in this book: the misconceptions of its sub-text, the intolerance for honest science, or the incompetence with which science is presented. In any case, teachers should be warned against using this book."

== History ==
The FTE's activist approach has produced heated controversies in several US states as Christian conservatives and school boards sought to adopt Of Pandas and People in public schools, against the opposition of mainstream scientists, educators and civil liberties organizations. This has caused several notable controversies, culminating in the Kitzmiller v. Dover Area School District case in Pennsylvania in which the contents and antecedents of the book came under scrutiny.

=== 1989–1993 ===
In Alabama, 11,800 people signed a petition which was presented to Alabama's school textbook committee, endorsing intelligent design and urging the adoption of Of Pandas and People as a class textbook. In January 1990 the book was withdrawn from consideration by its publishers, the Haughton Publishing Co., who said that they "backed off because they weren't given [the] chance to defend [the] book."

By 1990, a public campaign was mounted in Idaho to urge the state school board to adopt Of Pandas and People. However, the book was rejected by the board.

In March 1990, the school board in Pinellas County, Florida, rejected an appeal by a retired minister "to adopt the textbook Of Pandas and People that would offer a creationist's view".

In January 1993, right-wing members of the school board of Vista, California, sought to include Of Pandas and People in the school science curriculum. A teachers' committee voted unanimously to reject the book saying it lacked scientific merit. The board eventually backed away from plans to require creation science to be taught in science classes.

=== 1994–1998 ===
In September 1994, residents of Louisville, Ohio, voted 121–2 to urge the local school board to adopt Of Pandas and People. Creationism had been taught openly in district schools until a lawsuit forced a change of policy in 1993. In the wake of the decision, the district was given 150 copies of the book.

In October 1994, school officials in St. Lucie County, Florida, distributed copies of the book to every high school and one middle school in the county to be reviewed by teachers and principals for use as a possible supplement for science classes. The response from teachers was negative but county school officials still planned to distribute the books to school libraries so teachers and students could use it as a resource. According to the local Civic, Business and Ministry Coalition, copies of the book were purchased by the Coalition from the Institute for Creation Research in San Diego, California, and were sent to school administrators on the grounds that it was "a good, science-based text appropriate for school children". The Coalition was reported to have met administrators on several occasions to promote creation science. However, the county school board did not find out about the matter until January 1995.

The Wall Street Journal reported in November that according to the Foundation for Thought and Ethics, 22,500 copies of the book had been printed and teachers and curriculum buyers in 48 states had bought it. Fifteen school districts had ordered quantities large enough to indicate classroom use, but had not been identified "for fear of embroiling them in controversy".

In January 1995, conservative members of the Plano, Texas, school trust proposed to adopt Of Pandas and People as a supplement to the existing curriculum course materials. The district school board unanimously voted to bar the book's acquisition following an outcry from local residents, many of whom attended the board's meeting wearing buttons with a red "X" over a panda. Two of the proponents of the book subsequently lost their seats on the Plano school board.

In a 1996 Time magazine article it was reported that "school boards in Washington State and Ohio" were considering whether to adopt Of Pandas and People as a school textbook.

In April 1997, the school board of Chesapeake, Virginia, purchased copies of the book for the libraries of each of the district's 15 high schools and middle schools. The acquisition was made on the recommendation of School Superintendent W. Randolph Nichols, but the board stated that the book was intended for use "as a resource book, not as a science book" and that it was not endorsing creationism.

=== 1999–2003 ===
In June 1999, the school district in Burlington, Washington, approved a local science teacher's proposal to use extracts from Of Pandas and People in the classroom "so long as he balances it with enough support for teachings on evolution which he always included in his courses but about which he says he has doubts – especially in terms of the origin of the human race". The decision followed an earlier demand by the American Civil Liberties Union, that the teacher, Roger DeHart, should cease his years-long practice of teaching intelligent design in his classes. He stated that he needed to counterbalance the inclusion of information that was "at best wrong and at worst fraudulent" in the standard textbooks used in Burlington schools.

That same year, another attempt to introduce Of Pandas and People into Idaho schools was reported to have been rejected by the state textbook committee.

In March 2000, the science curriculum director of the Kanawha County, West Virginia, school district selected Of Pandas and People as a textbook "that presents Darwin's Theory of Evolution as theory, not fact" following pressure from the local community and teachers. A committee of science teachers unanimously voted to purchase copies of the book, but ultimately decided to abandon the idea for fear of litigation. A Christian conservative legal group, the Thomas More Law Center, offered to represent the county for free if any litigation arose but its offer was rejected. A proposal to buy the book for school libraries was eventually rejected by the school board, though a conservative member of the board pledged to pay for at least 14 copies out of her own pocket.

In August 1999, the local school board in Pratt, Kansas, voted to remove any mention of macroevolution, the age of the Earth, and the origin of the Universe from science curriculum, but rejected a bid to adopt Of Pandas and People for educational purposes.

=== 2004–2005: Dover, Pennsylvania ===
Of Pandas and People became the focus of a litigation and controversy in Dover, Pennsylvania in 2004 after the Dover Area School Board endorsed it as a reference book. The ensuing court case was dubbed the "Panda Trial" by the media in an allusion to the famous "Monkey Trial" of 1925.

Although the board did not actually purchase the book, 60 copies were donated to the district by an anonymous party. It was revealed in court that a school board member asked his church for donations for the purchase of those books although that board member had denied all knowledge of the source of donation in an earlier deposition. Amid an international controversy, the board also became the first in the US to promote the teaching of intelligent design in the classroom, sparking a lawsuit, Kitzmiller v. Dover Area School District, by the American Civil Liberties Union and other plaintiffs.

The FTE became involved in the Dover controversy when it became clear that Of Pandas and People would be a major focus of litigation. The foundation filed a motion to join the defending side in June 2005, arguing that a finding that intelligent design was religious would destroy FTE's ability to market its textbooks within the district, and affect its ability to market the textbooks to any public school in the United States. Had the motion been granted, the FTE would have become a co-defendant with the Dover Area School Board, and able to bring its own lawyers and expert witnesses to the case. However, William A. Dembski, co-author of the new Pandas edition, and the Discovery Institute withdrew from the case. The Judge told the defendants: "To me it looks like Mr. Dembski was dropped as an expert because he didn't want to produce, or because his employer didn't want to produce the manuscript [on subpoena to the court] of The Design of Life."

In his decision on the motion, Judge John E. Jones III ruled that FTE was not entitled to intervene in the case because its motion to intervene was not timely, describing FTE's excuses for not trying to become involved earlier as "both unavailing and disingenuous". Judge Jones also held that FTE failed to demonstrate that it has "a significantly protectable interest in the litigation warranting intervention as a party" and that its interests will not be adequately represented by the defendants.

While FTE did not become a party, Jon A. Buell, the director of FTE testified on July 14, 2005, at the Dover Trial. Buell denied having known about actions of the Thomas More Law Center to which the Judge said it "strains credulity".

In November 2005, eight of the nine members of the Dover school board were voted out of office and replaced with candidates who opposed the previous board's decision to introduce intelligent design and lay doubts on evolution.

On December 20, 2005, the US District Court ruled that intelligent design is not science and is essentially religious in nature, and the board's requirement endorsing intelligent design as an alternative to evolution in science classes, unconstitutional on the grounds that its inclusion violates the Establishment Clause of the First Amendment.

The judge in the Dover trial specifically referred to Pandas in his decision, stating:

As Plaintiffs meticulously and effectively presented to the Court, Pandas went through many drafts, several of which were completed prior to and some after the Supreme Court's decision in Edwards, which held that the Constitution forbids teaching creationism as science. By comparing the pre and post Edwards drafts of Pandas, three astonishing points emerge: (1) the definition for creation science in early drafts is identical to the definition of ID; (2) cognates of the word creation (creationism and creationist), which appeared approximately 150 times, were deliberately and systematically replaced with the phrase ID; and (3) the changes occurred shortly after the Supreme Court held that creation science is religious and cannot be taught in public school science classes in Edwards. This word substitution is telling, significant, and reveals that a purposeful change of words was effected without any corresponding change in content .... The weight of the evidence clearly demonstrates, as noted, that the systemic change from "creation" to "intelligent design" occurred sometime in 1987, after the Supreme Court's important Edwards decision.

— Judge John E. Jones III, Kitzmiller v. Dover Area School District

The newly elected board unanimously rescinded the policy on January 3, 2006.
