= Percival Davis =

American author

Bill Davis
- Born: Percival William Davis; United States
- Education: DePauw University (BA); Columbia University (MA); University of South Florida (PhD)
- Title: Former professor at Hillsborough Community College

See also Clifford Grey, whose real name was Percival Davis.

Percival William Davis, also known as Bill Davis, is an American author, young Earth creationist, and intelligent design proponent.

== Education and career ==
Davis graduated from DePauw University with a Bachelor of Arts in zoology in 1958. He then earned a Master of Arts in zoology in 1961 from Columbia University and a Ph.D. from the University of South Florida in 1993 in instructional technology.

Beginning in 1968, Davis was a professor of Life Science at Hillsborough Community College in Tampa, Florida but has since retired. Since 2006, he has been a visiting professor of biology at Clearwater Christian College.

== Intelligent design ==
The term "intelligent design" came into general usage following the publishing of the 1989 book Of Pandas and People co-authored by Davis and Dean H. Kenyon. The pair suggested that Darwinism, more than a century old, had outlived its usefulness, primarily because evolution was unable to explain all the biological complexities, which they argue show evidence of an intelligent designer. Davis additionally co-wrote A Case for Creation with Wayne Frair, published by Moody Bible Institute in 1983.

In a November 1994 Wall Street Journal front-page article concerning why he decided to co-author Of Pandas and People, quoted Davis saying "Of course my motives were religious. There's no question about it."

== Books ==
- Davis PW. and Frair W. A Case for Creation. 3d. rev. ed. (Chicago: Moody Press, 1983).
- Davis PW., Villee C, Solomon EP. Biology (Philadelphia: W.B. Saunders, 1985).
- Davis PW. and Dean H. Kenyon. Of Pandas and People. (Texas: Foundation for Thought and Ethics, 1989, 1993) ISBN 0-914513-40-0
- Davis PW. and Solomon EP. Human Anatomy and Physiology. (Philadelphia: W.B. Saunders, 1983).
- Davis PW. and Solomon EP. The World of Biology, 3rd Ed. Philadelphia, PA: Saunders, 1986.
- Understanding Human Anatomy and Physiology (McGraw-Hill)
