= Wendell Bird =

American legal scholar and lawyer

- Education: Vanderbilt University (B.A.); University of Oxford (D.Phil); Yale Law School
- Occupations: Legal scholar and Lawyer

Wendell Bird is an American legal scholar and lawyer. He is a visiting scholar at Emory University School of Law.

He is the author of four books on freedoms of speech and press: Press and Speech Under Assault (Oxford University Press 2016), Criminal Dissent: Prosecutions under the Alien and Sedition Acts (Harvard University Press 2020), The Revolution in Freedoms of Press and Speech: From Blackstone to the First Amendment and Fox's Libel Act (Oxford University Press 2020), and of Religious Speech and the Quest for Freedoms (Cambridge University Press 2023). He has also published legal history chapters and articles.

== Education ==
Bird graduated from Vanderbilt University (B.A., summa cum laude). He then earned his D.Phil. in legal history from the University of Oxford, and his J.D. from Yale Law School. As a law student, he was an editor of The Yale Law Journal and received the law school's Egger Prize.

== Nonprofit organization law ==
He has published three tax chapters and more than 20 articles on the laws affecting nonprofit organizations and charitable giving. He has been an annual faculty member of the Washington Non-Profit Legal & Tax Conference for over 30 years, and is a member of the Board of Advisors of the RIA Thomson Reuters publication, Taxation of Exempts. He has been a member of the Board of Advisors of New York University School of Law's National Center on Philanthropy and the Law.

== Litigation ==
In litigation Bird primarily represented securities claims, such as a suit against Merrill Lynch and its Focus Twenty Fund, or a suit against TH Lee Putnam Ventures and Merrill Lynch, both of which resulted in favorable decisions; and charitable fraud and diversion claims, such as a suit on behalf of the M. L. Simpson Foundation. In 2004, Bird represented APA Excelsior III (owned by predecessor to APAX Partners) and other large Wall Street private equity funds (managed by APAX Partners) in a federal court lawsuit alleging securities law violations in connection with a sale to Healthfield Holdings, Inc.

In 2000–2002, he represented the Bengard Group in a trial and appeal involving sale of a business, winning in excess of $44 million.

In the early 1980s, Bird worked for an Atlanta law firm, and also served as a special assistant attorney general for the State of Louisiana, for which he argued Edwards v. Aguillard to the U.S. Supreme Court.

== Other ==
He is a member of the American Society for Legal History and of the Society for Historians of the Early Republic. He is also a member of the American Law Institute, a fellow of the American Bar Foundation, and was co-chair of the American Bar Association Subcommittee on Charitable Contributions for nearly 20 years. He is listed in Who's Who in America (1995–present) and Who's Who in the World (1995–present).

== Nonprofit organization law chapters and articles ==
- Wendell R. Bird, "Religious Organizations and Tax Law," Federal and State Taxation of Exempt Organizations, Chapter 4, Warren Gorhan & Lamont Publishers, 1994.
- Wendell R. Bird & Russell Reach, "Unrelated Debt-Financed Income," 8 CCH's Federal Tax Service J: Chapter 6 (1995).
- Wendell R. Bird & Russell Reach, "Debt-Financed Income," Bender's Federal Tax Service J: Chapter 6 (1988).
- Wendell R. Bird, "No Relief But Much Red Tape for Charities and Foundation," 17 Taxation of Exempts 201 (2006).
- Wendell R. Bird, " IRS Offers Guidance on "Election Year Issues" for Exempt Organizations," 15 Taxation of Exempts 269 (2004).
- Wendell R. Bird, "Charitable Giving Techniques and Other Estate Techniques," Journal of Retirement Planning at 9 (Nov.-Dec. 2003).
- Wendell R. Bird, "The Shape of Charitable Gift Planning After 'Repeal' of the Federal Estate Tax," 14 Taxation of Exempts 114 (2002).
- Wendell R. Bird, "Political Activities and Exempt Organizations," 12 Journal of Taxation of Exempt Organizations 243 (2000).
- Wendell R. Bird, "Exempt Organizations Rules on Political Activities," 7 Journal of Tax Exempt Organizations 195, (1996). [31]
- Wendell R. Bird & Harvey Koning III, "Exempt Organizations Face Sales and Use Taxes in the Aftermath of Quill," 6 Journal of Tax Exempt Organizations 16 (1994).
- Wendell R. Bird & Timothy W. Townsend, "Current Developments in the State and Local Taxation of Exempt Organizations", 4 Journal of Tax'n of Exempt Org. (WGL) 20 (1992).
- Wendell R. Bird & Timothy W. Townsend, "Sales Tax Relief Not Automatic for Tax-Exempt Entities," 2 Journal of Multistate Taxation 203 (1992).
- Wendell R. Bird & T.O. Kotouc, "Exempt Religious Organizations Have Strict Limits", 48 Taxation for Accountants 207 (1992).
