= Kitzmiller v. Dover Area School District =

2005 court case in Pennsylvania

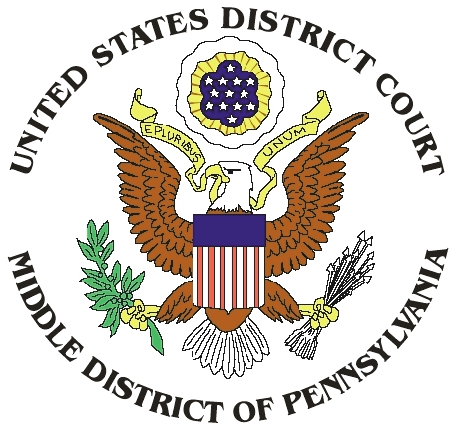
- Court: United States District Court for the Middle District of Pennsylvania
- Full case name: Tammy Kitzmiller, et al. v. Dover Area School District, et al.
- Argued: September 26, 2005 – November 4, 2005
- Decided: December 20, 2005
- Docket nos.: 4:04-cv-2688
- Citation: 400 F. Supp. 2d 707

Holding
- Teaching intelligent design in public school biology classes violates the Establishment Clause of the First Amendment to the Constitution of the United States (and Article I, Section 3, of the Pennsylvania State Constitution) because intelligent design is not science and "cannot uncouple itself from its creationist, and thus religious, antecedents."

Court membership
- Judge sitting: John E. Jones III

Laws applied
- U.S. Const. Amend. 1; Penn. Const. Art. I, § 3

Kitzmiller v. Dover Area School District, 400 F. Supp. 2d 707 (M.D. Pa. 2005) was the first case brought in the United States federal courts testing a public school policy requiring the teaching of intelligent design (ID). The court found intelligent design to be not science. In October 2004, the Dover Area School District of York County, Pennsylvania, changed its biology teaching curriculum to require that intelligent design be presented as an alternative to evolution theory, and that Of Pandas and People, a textbook advocating intelligent design, was to be used as a reference book. The prominence of this textbook during the trial was such that the case is sometimes referred to as the Dover Panda Trial, a name which recalls the popular name of the Scopes Monkey Trial in Tennessee, 80 years earlier. The plaintiffs successfully argued that intelligent design is a form of creationism, and that the school board policy violated the Establishment Clause of the First Amendment to the United States Constitution. The judge's decision sparked considerable response from both supporters and critics.

Eleven parents of students in Dover, York County, Pennsylvania, near the city of York, sued the Dover Area School District over the school board requirement that a statement presenting intelligent design as "an explanation of the origin of life that differs from Darwin's view" was to be read aloud in ninth-grade science classes when evolution was taught. The plaintiffs were represented by the American Civil Liberties Union (ACLU), Americans United for Separation of Church and State (AU) and Pepper Hamilton LLP. The National Center for Science Education (NCSE) acted as consultants for the plaintiffs. The defendants were represented by the Thomas More Law Center (TMLC). The Foundation for Thought and Ethics, publisher of Of Pandas and People, tried to join the lawsuit late as a defendant but was denied for multiple reasons.

The suit was brought in the U.S. District Court for the Middle District of Pennsylvania seeking declaratory and injunctive relief. Since it sought a purely equitable remedy, under the Seventh Amendment, the right to a jury trial did not apply. It was tried in a bench trial from September 26, 2005, to November 4, 2005, before Judge John E. Jones III, a Republican appointed in 2002 by George W. Bush.

== Outcomes ==
=== Legal ===
On December 20, 2005, Jones issued his 139-page findings of fact and decision ruling that the Dover mandate requiring the statement to be read in class was unconstitutional. The ruling concluded that intelligent design is not science, and permanently barred the board from requiring teachers to denigrate or disparage the scientific theory of evolution, and from requiring ID to be taught as an alternative theory.

=== Local school board ===
All eight of the Dover school board members who were up for re-election on November 8, 2005, were defeated by a set of challengers who opposed the teaching of intelligent design in a science class. (The ninth member was not up for re-election.) The new school board president subsequently stated that the board did not intend to appeal the ruling.

== Background ==
From 2002, William (Bill) Buckingham and Alan Bonsell, members of the Dover Area School District Board of Education who were young Earth creationists, had made various statements supporting teaching creationism alongside evolution. At a board meeting on June 7, 2004, Buckingham mentioned creationism and raised objections to the proposed use of the textbook Biology written by Kenneth R. Miller and Joseph S. Levine, describing it as "laced with Darwinism" and saying it was "inexcusable to have a book that says man descended from apes with nothing to counterbalance it."

This story made the York newspapers, and Buckingham was telephoned by Discovery Institute staff attorney Seth Cooper, whose tasks included "communicating with legislators, school board members, teachers, parents and students" to "address the topic of ID in a scientifically and educationally responsible way" in public schools. He later stated that he made the call to "steer the Dover Board away from trying to include intelligent design in the classroom or from trying to insert creationism into its cirriculum [sic]", an account Buckingham has disputed. Cooper sent the book and DVD of Icons of Evolution to Buckingham, who required the Dover High School science teachers to watch the DVD. They did not take up the opportunity to use it in their classes.

Cooper advised that the Discovery Institute was not offering legal advice, and soon afterwards Buckingham contacted Richard Thompson of the Thomas More Law Center, who agreed to represent the Dover Board, and recommended the book Of Pandas and People. On October 18, 2004, the school board voted 6–3 resolving that there were to be lectures on the subject, with Pandas as a reference book, and that the following statement was to be added to their biology curriculum: "Students will be made aware of the gaps/problems in Darwin's theory and of other theories of evolution including, but not limited to, intelligent design. Note: Origins of life is not taught."

On November 19, 2004, the Dover Area School District issued a press release stating that, commencing in January 2005, teachers would be required to read the following statement to students in the ninth-grade biology class at Dover High School:

The Pennsylvania Academic Standards require students to learn about Darwin's theory of evolution and eventually to take a standardized test of which evolution is a part.

Because Darwin's Theory is a theory, it is still being tested as new evidence is discovered. The Theory is not a fact. Gaps in the Theory exist for which there is no evidence. A theory is defined as a well-tested explanation that unifies a broad range of observations.

Intelligent design is an explanation of the origin of life that differs from Darwin's view. The reference book Of Pandas and People, is available for students to see if they would like to explore this view in an effort to gain an understanding of what intelligent design actually involves.

As is true with any theory, students are encouraged to keep an open mind. The school leaves the discussion of the origins of life to individual students and their families. As a standards-driven district, class instruction focuses upon preparing students to achieve proficiency on standards-based assessments.

— (page 1 of decision)

The three school board members who voted against it resigned in protest, and science teachers in the district refused to read the statement to their ninth-grade students, citing the Pennsylvania state code 235.10(2), which requires that "The professional educator may not ... Knowingly and intentionally misrepresent subject matter or curriculum." Instead, the statement was read to students by a school administrator.

The school board's statement asserting that there are "gaps" in evolution and that it specifically is a theory "not a fact" singled out evolution, implying it is just a hunch, even though this is not the actual meaning of the term "scientific theory". The reference to Of Pandas and People and presentation of intelligent design as an alternative "explanation of the origins of life" presented it as though it were a scientific explanation, in contrast to the way that evolution was described. Encouraging students to "keep an open mind" about alternatives without offering an alternative scientific explanation implied an invitation to meditate on a religious view, endorsing the religious view in a way similar to the disclaimer found to be unconstitutional in the Freiler v. Tangipahoa Parish Board of Education case. The school board claimed the statement does not teach intelligent design and simply makes students aware of its existence as an alternative to evolution, but no such statements were made about other subjects. As part of the presentation, the administrators stated that "there will be no other discussion of the issue and your teachers will not answer questions on the issue", giving intelligent design a position not applied to scientific topics. The board denied that intelligent design was "religion in disguise," despite being represented in court by the Thomas More Law Center, a conservative Christian not-for-profit law center that uses litigation to promote "the religious freedom of Christians and time-honored family values". Its stated purpose is "... to be the sword and shield for people of faith".

The American Civil Liberties Union filed suit on December 14, 2004, on behalf of eleven parents from the Dover school district, and sought a law firm willing to take on the case at the risk of not being paid if the case was lost. Eric Rothschild, a partner at Pepper Hamilton LLP and a member of the National Center for Science Education legal advisory council, was quick to agree to take the case on such a contingency basis.

The Discovery Institute's John West said the case displayed the ACLU's "Orwellian" effort to stifle scientific discourse and objected to the issue being decided in court. "It's a disturbing prospect that the outcome of this lawsuit could be that the court will try to tell scientists what is legitimate scientific inquiry and what is not," West said. "That is a flagrant assault on free speech." Opponents, represented by the American Association for the Advancement of Science and the National Association of Biology Teachers, contended that his statement is not just ironic, but hypocritical, as the Discovery Institute opposes methodological naturalism, the basic principle that limits science to natural phenomena and natural causes without assuming the existence or non-existence of the supernatural, which by definition is beyond natural explanation.

Despite its earlier involvement, the Discovery Institute was concerned that this would be a test case and that the defendants had earlier displayed their religious motivations. This tension led to disagreements with the Thomas More Law Center and the withdrawal of three Discovery Institute fellows as defense experts prior to their depositions – William A. Dembski, Stephen C. Meyer and John Angus Campbell. This was purportedly because the Thomas More Law Center refused to allow these witnesses to have their own attorneys present during deposition, but Discovery Institute director Bruce Chapman later said that he had asked them not to testify (as well as Behe and Minnich, who testified anyway).

In May 2005, the publisher of Of Pandas and People, the Foundation for Thought and Ethics (FTE), filed a motion seeking to intervene in the case. FTE argued that a ruling that intelligent design was religious would have severe financial consequences, citing possible losses of approximately half a million dollars. By intervening, FTE would have become a co-defendant with the Dover Area School Board, and able to bring its own lawyers and expert witnesses to the case. FTE's president Jon Buell implied that if allowed to intervene, FTE would bring Dembski and Meyer as expert witnesses. In his decision on the motion, Jones ruled that FTE was not entitled to intervene in the case because its motion to intervene was not timely, describing FTE's reasons for not trying to become involved earlier as "both unavailing and disingenuous". Jones also held that FTE had failed to demonstrate that it has "a significantly protectable interest in the litigation warranting intervention as a party" and that its interests would not be adequately represented by the defendants.

In the November 2005 elections, eight of the nine members of the Dover school board were voted out of office. None of the members of the Dover School Board who voted for the intelligent design policy were re-elected, and a new school board, which rejected the policy, took office. This effectively precluded the possibility of an appeal to a higher court.

== Litigants ==
The litigants of this trial were as follows.

=== Plaintiffs ===
The plaintiffs were all parents of students enrolled in the Dover Area School district.

- Tammy Kitzmiller
- Bryan Rehm
- Christy Rehm
- Deborah Fenimore
- Joel Lieb
- Steven Stough
- Beth Eveland
- Cynthia Sneath
- Julie Smith
- Aralene "Barrie" D. Callahan
- Frederick B. Callahan

=== Defendants ===
- Dover Area School District
- Dover Area School District Board of Directors
  Members who voted for the statement:
  - Bill Buckingham (resigned August 2005 due to health concerns)
  - Alan Bonsell
  - Sheila Harkins
  - Heather Geesey
  - Jane Cleaver (resigned October 4, 2004)
  - Angie Ziegler-Yingling (resigned December 6, 2004)
  Members who voted against it:
  - Noel Wenrich (announced his resignation October 4, 2004; last day of service was October 31, 2004; moved out of the district)
  - Carol Brown (resigned October 18, 2004, in protest)
  - Jeff Brown (resigned October 18, 2004, in protest)

== Trial ==
The trial began on September 26, 2005.

=== Opening statements ===
==== Plaintiffs ====
Eric Rothschild gave the opening statement for the plaintiffs. He said that the plaintiffs would be able to provide many examples of school board members wishing to balance the teaching of evolution with creationism. He attacked prior defense claims that it was a minor affair by saying that there is no such thing as a "little" constitutional violation. He also provided the definition of creationism given by an early draft of Pandas: "Creation is the theory that various forms of life began abruptly, with their distinctive features already intact: Fish with fins and scales, birds with feathers and wings, mammals with fur and mammary glands." He compared this with what was eventually published: "Intelligent design means that various forms of life began abruptly through an intelligent agency, with their distinctive features already intact: Fish with fins and scales, birds with feathers, beaks and wings, et cetera." (The definitions had come up earlier in a July 14 pre-trial hearing.) He also argued that intelligent design was not science in its infancy, but rather was not science at all.

==== Defense ====
Patrick Gillen gave the opening arguments for the defense. He started by saying that the goal of the board and its supporters was to enhance science education. He argued that the policy was a "modest change". He distanced the policy from alleged statements by then board member William Buckingham that the plaintiffs argued showed clear religious intent: "The board listened to the science faculty more than it listened to Bill Buckingham." He argued that the policy did not have a "religious agenda". Gillen mentioned that board member Alan Bonsell had done his own reading. He said Bonsell was "aware of intelligent design theory, and that 300 or so scientists had signed a statement indicating that biologists were exaggerating claims for the theory. He had read about the famous Piltdown Man hoax. He had an interest in creationism."

=== Witnesses ===
==== Witnesses for the plaintiffs ====
September 27, 2005

- Kenneth R. Miller, a biology professor from Brown University and noted author and commentator opposed to the intelligent design and creationist movements, was the first witness. He testified as an expert witness that "Intelligent design is not a testable theory and as such is not generally accepted by the scientific community." He said that the idea of intelligent design was not subject to falsification, and demonstrated that many claims made by intelligent-design advocates against evolution were invalid. When asked what the harm was in reading the statement, Miller gave a two-fold response. 1) "[I]t falsely undermines the scientific status of evolutionary theory and gives students a false understanding of what theory actually means." And 2) "As a person of faith who was blessed with two daughters, who raised both of my daughters in the church, and had they been given an education in which they were explicitly or implicitly forced to choose between God and science, I would have been furious, because I want my children to keep their religious faith."
- Tammy Kitzmiller testified as a fact witness. She was the lead plaintiff and a parent of a child in the Dover school system.
- Aralene "Barrie" D. Callahan, a Dover parent, was a plaintiff and was for ten years a board member of the Dover Area School District. She testified that Alan Bonsell, a board member, argued in a board retreat in Spring 2003 that if evolution were taught then creationism should also be taught.
- Bryan Rehm was the last witness of the day. He was a former physics teacher at Dover and a parent to children attending school at the Dover Area School District. Both he and his wife were plaintiffs and taught Vacation Bible School. Rehm testified that Alan Bonsell, then-chairman of the board's curriculum committee, had asked teachers to watch a video on intelligent design titled Icons of Evolution. Teachers had expressed concern that Bonsell did not believe in evolution and wished to see classroom discussions of evolution balanced "fifty-fifty" with creationism.

September 28

- Robert T. Pennock is a philosopher and the author of many books and articles critical of intelligent design, then working on the Avida digital organism project at Michigan State University where he was an associate professor. He testified as an expert witness.
- Julie Smith testified as a parent and plaintiff that the policy created a hostile atmosphere for her daughter. She said her daughter had been harassed for her Catholic background, being told that she was an atheist since she accepted evolution.
- Christy Rehm testified as a parent and plaintiff.
- Beth Eveland testified.
- Frederick Callahan testified.

September 29

- Carol Brown testified.
- Jeffrey Brown testified.

September 30

- John Haught is a Roman Catholic theologian and the then Landegger Distinguished Professor of Theology at Georgetown University, with teaching and research interests focused on issues in science and religion, cosmology and theology, and religion and ecology.

October 5–6

- Barbara Forrest testified as an expert witness for the plaintiff and also furnished the court with a written expert witness report and a supplemental report. Forrest is a professor in philosophy in the Department of History and Political Science at Southeastern Louisiana University. She and scientist Paul R. Gross co-authored the book Creationism's Trojan Horse: The Wedge of Intelligent Design (Oxford University Press 2004).

Before her testimony, the TMLC filed a motion to have her excluded as an expert witness. In that motion they characterized her as "little more than a conspiracy theorist and a web-surfing, 'cyber-stalker' of the Discovery Institute." Jones denied the motion.

Forrest gave testimony on the history of the intelligent design movement, citing writings of prominent figures (such as Discovery Institute's "Wedge Document", Phillip Johnson's "How the Evolution Debate Can be Won", and of William Dembski). She also testified that ID was merely another name for the creationism movement, attempting to present a religious proposition as a scientific viewpoint. She stated that Johnson "regards evolution as a threat to the Bible in its entirety and as a threat to the moral fabric of American culture," and that one of the goals of his movement is to unify the religious world. She added that there is "no way to reconcile [...] at all" the Dover school board newsletter statement that intelligent design is a scientific theory with Paul Nelson's statements in the interview "The Measure of Design".

Forrest noted that she was unaware of any evidence that the members of the School board had seen the "Wedge Document" before the lawsuit.

Several days before her scheduled testimony, the Discovery Institute publicly ridiculed her on their website.

October 6

- Jennifer Miller testified.
- Bertha Spahr testified.

October 12

- Brian Alters testified.
- Cynthia Sneath testified.

October 14

- Steven Stough testified.
- Kevin Padian testified.
- Joel Lieb testified.

==== Witnesses for the defense ====
October 17–19

- Michael Behe was the first witness for the defense. Behe was professor of biochemistry at Lehigh University in Pennsylvania, and a leading intelligent design proponent who coined the term irreducible complexity and set out the idea in his 1996 book Darwin's Black Box.

As a primary witness for the defense, Behe was asked to support the idea that intelligent design was legitimate science. Behe's critics have pointed to a number of key exchanges under cross examination, where he conceded that, "There are no peer reviewed articles by anyone advocating for intelligent design supported by pertinent experiments or calculations which provide detailed rigorous accounts of how intelligent design of any biological system occurred."

In response to a question about astrology he explained: "Under my definition, a scientific theory is a proposed explanation which focuses or points to physical, observable data and logical inferences. There are many things throughout the history of science which we now think to be incorrect which nonetheless ... would fit that definition. Yes, astrology is in fact one, and so is the ether theory of the propagation of light, and ... many other theories as well."

Under oath he accepted that his simulation modelling of evolution with David Snoke, described in a 2004 paper, showed that the biochemical systems it described could evolve within 20,000 years, even if the parameters of the simulation were rigged to make that outcome as unlikely as possible.

October 20–21

- Richard Nilsen testified.

October 21, 28, November 3

- Michael Richard Baksa testified. He was the Dover Area School District Assistant Superintendent. In an email response to a complaint by social studies teacher Brad Neal, Baksa referred to The Myth of Separation by David Barton, a book Baksa had received from Superintendent Richard Nilsen, who had received it from board member Alan Bonsell. The book calls separation of church and state "absurd". Baksa also discussed attempted changes to the statement. Teachers suggested adding "Darwin's theory of evolution continues to be the dominant scientific explanation of the origin of species," but this was eliminated by the board. The teachers also recommended altering it to read "Because Darwin's theory is a theory, there is a significant amount of evidence that supports the theory, although it is still being tested as new evidence is discovered". Citing his belief the board would reject this, Baksa eliminated the "significant amount of evidence".

October 24

- Steve Fuller is a professor of sociology at the University of Warwick in England, and author of books on social epistemology and science and technology studies. His testimony essentially attempted a qualified defense of the scientific status of intelligent design, arguing that its history can be traced back to Newton, and should include such luminaries of modern biology as Linnaeus and Mendel. He also stressed a distinction from the philosophy of science between the "context of discovery" (what motivates a scientist) and the "context of justification" (how the scientist's theory is judged) in order to mitigate the undeniably religious origins of intelligent design. Fuller memorably called for an "affirmative action" program for intelligent design, which did not win much favor with Jones in his final decision. Fuller's testimony was cited by lawyers for both the plaintiffs and the defense in their closing statements.

==== Witnesses for the plaintiffs (called out-of-turn) ====
October 27

- William Buckingham testified and was ruled a hostile witness.

October 28

- Heidi Bernhard-Bubb testified.
- Joseph Maldonado testified.

==== Witnesses for the defense ====
October 28

- Heather Geesey testified.

October 31

- Jane Cleaver testified.
- Alan Bonsell testified. His testimony initially included a claim that he did not know where the money had been raised to donate sixty copies of Of Pandas and People to the school's library. On hearing that the money had been raised in William Buckingham's church, and directed through Bonsell's father so that it might be donated anonymously, Jones elected to take over the examination of Bonsell himself, questioning him for about ten minutes.

November 3

- Robert Linker testified.
- Scott Minnich testified.

=== Closing arguments ===
Closing arguments were made on November 4, 2005. Upon completion of the closing arguments, Gillen asked Jones, "By my reckoning, this is the 40th day since the trial began and tonight will be the 40th night, and I would like to know if you did that on purpose." (40 days and nights was the length of the Biblical Great Flood.) Jones responded, "Mr. Gillen, that is an interesting coincidence, but it was not by design." This humorous exchange provided the title for Matthew Chapman's 2007 book about the trial, 40 Days and 40 Nights.

=== Decision ===
On December 20, 2005, Jones found for the plaintiffs and issued a 139 page decision, in which he wrote:

- For the reasons that follow, we conclude that the religious nature of ID [intelligent design] would be readily apparent to an objective observer, adult or child.
- A significant aspect of the IDM [intelligent design movement] is that despite Defendants' protestations to the contrary, it describes ID as a religious argument. In that vein, the writings of leading ID proponents reveal that the designer postulated by their argument is the God of Christianity.
- The evidence at trial demonstrates that ID is nothing less than the progeny of creationism.
- The overwhelming evidence at trial established that ID is a religious view, a mere re-labeling of creationism, and not a scientific theory.
- Throughout the trial and in various submissions to the Court, Defendants vigorously argue that the reading of the statement is not 'teaching' ID but instead is merely 'making students aware of it.' In fact, one consistency among the Dover School Board members' testimony, which was marked by selective memories and outright lies under oath, as will be discussed in more detail below, is that they did not think they needed to be knowledgeable about ID because it was not being taught to the students. We disagree. ... an educator reading the disclaimer is engaged in teaching, even if it is colossally bad teaching. ... Defendants' argument is a red herring because the Establishment Clause forbids not just 'teaching' religion, but any governmental action that endorses or has the primary purpose or effect of advancing religion. (footnote 7)
- After a searching review of the record and applicable caselaw, we find that while ID arguments may be true, a proposition on which the Court takes no position, ID is not science. We find that ID fails on three different levels, any one of which is sufficient to preclude a determination that ID is science. They are: (1) ID violates the centuries-old ground rules of science by invoking and permitting supernatural causation; (2) the argument of irreducible complexity, central to ID, employs the same flawed and illogical contrived dualism that doomed creation science in the 1980s; and (3) ID's negative attacks on evolution have been refuted by the scientific community. ... It is additionally important to note that ID has failed to gain acceptance in the scientific community, it has not generated peer-reviewed publications, nor has it been the subject of testing and research. Expert testimony reveals that since the scientific revolution of the 16th and 17th centuries, science has been limited to the search for natural causes to explain natural phenomena. [for "contrived dualism", see false dilemma.]
- [T]he one textbook [Pandas] to which the Dover ID Policy directs students contains outdated concepts and flawed science, as recognized by even the defense experts in this case.
- ID's backers have sought to avoid the scientific scrutiny which we have now determined that it cannot withstand by advocating that the controversy, but not ID itself, should be taught in science class. This tactic is at best disingenuous, and at worst a canard. The goal of the IDM is not to encourage critical thought, but to foment a revolution which would supplant evolutionary theory with ID.
- Accordingly, we find that the secular purposes claimed by the Board amount to a pretext for the Board's real purpose, which was to promote religion in the public school classroom, in violation of the Establishment Clause.

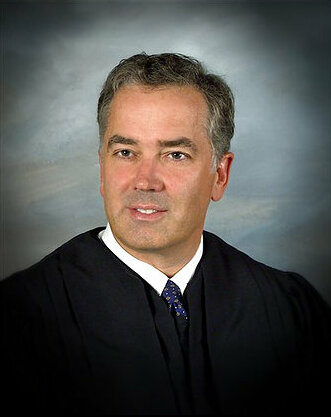
Judge John E. Jones III issued the decision in the case

In his Conclusion, he wrote:

- The proper application of both the endorsement and Lemon tests to the facts of this case makes it abundantly clear that the Board's ID Policy violates the Establishment Clause. In making this determination, we have addressed the seminal question of whether ID is science. We have concluded that it is not, and moreover that ID cannot uncouple itself from its creationist, and thus religious, antecedents. [...]
- The citizens of the Dover area were poorly served by the members of the Board who voted for the ID Policy. It is ironic that several of these individuals, who so staunchly and proudly touted their religious convictions in public, would time and again lie to cover their tracks and disguise the real purpose behind the ID Policy. With that said, we do not question that many of the leading advocates of ID have bona fide and deeply held beliefs which drive their scholarly endeavors. Nor do we controvert that ID should continue to be studied, debated, and discussed. As stated, our conclusion today is that it is unconstitutional to teach ID as an alternative to evolution in a public school science classroom.

== Responses ==
Jones anticipated that his ruling would be criticized, saying in his decision:

Those who disagree with our holding will likely mark it as the product of an activist judge. If so, they will have erred as this is manifestly not an activist Court. Rather, this case came to us as the result of the activism of an ill-informed faction on a school board, aided by a national public interest law firm eager to find a constitutional test case on ID, who in combination drove the Board to adopt an imprudent and ultimately unconstitutional policy. The breathtaking inanity of the Board's decision is evident when considered against the factual backdrop which has now been fully revealed through this trial. The students, parents, and teachers of the Dover Area School District deserved better than to be dragged into this legal maelstrom, with its resulting utter waste of monetary and personal resources.

Fulfilling Jones's prediction, John G. West, associate director of the Center for Science and Culture at Discovery Institute, said on December 20, 2005:

The Dover decision is an attempt by an activist federal judge to stop the spread of a scientific idea and even to prevent criticism of Darwinian evolution through government-imposed censorship rather than open debate, and it won't work. He has conflated Discovery Institute's position with that of the Dover school board, and he totally misrepresents intelligent design and the motivations of the scientists who research it.

Newspapers commented that the judge is "a Republican and a churchgoer". In the months following the decision, Jones received bags of mail, including threats against him and his family serious enough to warrant around-the-clock U.S. Marshal protection.

== Settlement of the legal fees ==
An election in November, 2005, resulted in defeat for school board members who had defended the ID policy. On January 3, 2006, the newly elected Dover Area School Board unanimously rescinded the policy.

The school board voted on February 21, 2006, unanimously with one abstention, to pay $1,000,011 in legal fees and damages due to the parents and their lawyers as a result of the verdict in the case, a large sum of money for a small district. The previous school board had been offered the opportunity to rescind its policy, and avoid paying legal fees, immediately after the lawsuit was filed in 2004, but it declined. The parents' attorneys Pepper Hamilton stated that court records would show that they were entitled to more than $2 million, but were going to accept less than half that amount in recognition of the small size of the school district, and because the school board that voted for the policy had been voted out of office, leaving the new school board "having the bill placed in their laps." The previous school board had been defended without charge by the Thomas More Law Center. Richard Katskee, assistant legal director for Americans United, said of the trial's cost, "Any board thinking of trying to do what the Dover board did is going to have to look for a bill in excess of $2 million," and "I think $2 million is a lot to explain to taxpayers for a lawsuit that should never be fought."

== Potential perjury and deceit ==
After the trial, there were calls for the defendants, accused of not presenting their case honestly, to be put on trial for committing perjury. "Witnesses either testified inconsistently, or lied outright under oath on several occasions," Jones wrote. "The inescapable truth is that both [Alan] Bonsell and [William] Buckingham lied at their January 3, 2005 depositions. ... Bonsell repeatedly failed to testify in a truthful manner. ... Defendants have unceasingly attempted in vain to distance themselves from their own actions and statements, which culminated in repetitious, untruthful testimony." An editorial in the York Daily Record described their behavior as both ironic and sinful, saying that the "unintelligent designers of this fiasco should not walk away unscathed." Judge Jones recommended to the US Attorney's office that the school board members be investigated for perjury.

=== Specific potential perjury ===
- The defendants claimed that they were presenting an alternative scientific theory, not promoting religion. The creationist intentions of the Dover School Board are detailed on the site for Lauri Lebo's book, The Devil in Dover. But during the trial, Bill Buckingham claimed, "... we would say 'intelligent design' and they would print 'creationism'. It happened all the time," although the plaintiffs presented video of him advocating creationism.
- Of Pandas and People
1. The Dover School District Superintendent had announced an anonymous donation of books (60 copies of Of Pandas and People). The Board responded that the donors wanted to remain anonymous when pressed by the public.
2. In his January 2005 deposition, Buckingham denied knowing where the book donations came from.
3. During the trial, plaintiff attorney Steve Harvey produced a 2004-10-04 check from board member Buckingham for $850 with the memo "for Pandas and People" written out to Donald Bonsell, father of school board president Alan Bonsell. Buckingham had given the check to Alan Bonsell, who gave it to his father, who would "take it off the table" (according to Alan Bonsell) and buy the books. The money had come from donations from parishioners of Buckingham's church after he stood up and said the board needed it. Bonsell also denied in deposition knowing where the books came from.
- Michael Behe testified on the morning of 2005-10-17, day 10 of the trial, that "... Intelligent Design is a scientific theory." But in his 2005-10-18 afternoon testimony, during cross-examination, Behe said that his definition of a scientific theory differs from the accepted definition and would allow both the long-disproved ether theory of light (idea of luminiferous aether) and astrology to be classified as scientific theories. Since the standard definition of a scientific theory includes "... a well-substantiated explanation ...", Behe's personal definition would allow for disproved ideas to be considered scientific theories, whereas the standard definition does not. Behe defended his version of the definition of scientific theory as being one that is commonly used among scientists. Who these scientists are and where they use the Behe definition was not clarified. But Behe's employer, Lehigh University, in an undated proclamation, stated the department faculty's unequivocal support for evolution and "... It is our collective position that intelligent design has no basis in science ..."
- Bacterial Flagellum claims
1. Behe engaged in quote-mining, at best, regarding the bacterial flagellum. During his 2005-10-17 (Day 10) morning testimony, when asked "Have other scientists acknowledged these design features of the flagellum?", Behe cited a 1998 article in the journal Cell by Brandeis University professor David J. DeRosier, The Turn of the Screw, The Bacterial Flagellar Motor, and Derosier's statement that the bacterial flagellum looked designed. Behe left it at that.
2. He omitted, as Derosier pointed out in the Nova documentary, that Derosier wrote that bacterial flagellum looked like it was designed by a human. Derosier went on to add that in fact, the evidence pointed to evolution. That is not explicit in the article, but Derosier is known as an evolution proponent, so Behe should have known, since he quotes Derosier seemingly as in agreement, that Derosier disagreed with him regarding whether the bacterial flagellum points to evolution or Intelligent Design.

== Analysis and criticism ==
The University of Montana Law Review published three articles addressing this topic in its winter 2007 issue. David K. DeWolf, John G. West and Casey Luskin, senior fellows or officers of the Discovery Institute, argued that intelligent design is a valid scientific theory, that the Jones court should not have addressed the question of whether it was a scientific theory, and that the decision will have no effect on the development and adoption of intelligent design as an alternative to standard evolutionary theory. Peter Irons responded to the DeWolf et al. article, arguing that the decision was extremely well reasoned, and that it marks the end to legal efforts by the intelligent design movement to introduce creationism in public schools. It had been an essential part of the ruling to consider whether ID was a legitimate scientific theory as claimed by its proponents, and DeWolf, et al. had implicitly recognised this by citing the Lemon test, which would have been irrelevant if ID were legitimate science. DeWolf et al. responded to the Irons article in the same issue.

== Documentaries ==
- A War on Science, a 49-minute BBC Horizon television documentary about intelligent design, including the Kitzmiller v. Dover court battle. It prominently features Oxford University professor and biologist Richard Dawkins. It was first broadcast on 26 January 2006. Intelligent design supporters and promoters Phillip E. Johnson, Michael Behe, Stephen C. Meyer and William A. Dembski also appear in the documentary.
- Judgment Day: Intelligent Design on Trial, a Public Broadcasting Service NOVA television documentary aired in November 2007. It features interviews with Jones, witnesses, and lawyers as well as re-enacted scenes from the proceedings (no cameras were allowed in court).

== See also ==
- Court cases:
  - Scopes Trial (1925)
  - McLean v. Arkansas (1981)
  - Lemon v. Kurtzman (1971)
  - Edwards v. Aguillard (1987)
  - Freiler v. Tangipahoa Parish Board of Education (1997) where a similar disclaimer was found unconstitutional.
  - Selman v. Cobb County School District (2004–2005)
