= Edwards v. Aguillard =

US Supreme Court case concerning the constitutionality of teaching creationism

- Supreme Court of the United States

Argued December 10, 1986 Decided June 19, 1987
- Full case name: Edwin W. Edwards, Governor of Louisiana, et al., Appellants v. Don Aguillard et al.
- Citations: 482 U.S. 578 (more) 107 S. Ct. 2573; 96 L. Ed. 2d 510; 1987 U.S. LEXIS 2729; 55 U.S.L.W. 4860
- Argument: Oral argument
- Decision: Opinion

Case history
- Prior: 765 F.2d 1251 (5th Cir. 1985)

Holding
- Teaching creationism in public schools is unconstitutional because it attempts to advance a particular religion.

Court membership
- Chief Justice William Rehnquist Associate Justices William J. Brennan Jr. · Byron White; Thurgood Marshall · Harry Blackmun; Lewis F. Powell Jr. · John P. Stevens; Sandra Day O'Connor · Antonin Scalia

Case opinions
- Majority: Brennan, joined by Marshall, Blackmun, Powell, Stevens; O'Connor (all but part II)
- Concurrence: Powell, joined by O'Connor
- Concurrence: White (in judgment)
- Dissent: Scalia, joined by Rehnquist

Laws applied
- U.S. Const. amend. I

Edwards v. Aguillard, 482 U.S. 578 (1987), was a United States Supreme Court case concerning the constitutionality of teaching creationism. The Court considered a Louisiana law requiring that where evolutionary science was taught in public schools, creation science must also be taught. The constitutionality of the law was successfully challenged in District Court, Aguillard v. Treen, 634 F. Supp. 426 (ED La.1985), and the United States Court of Appeals for the Fifth Circuit affirmed, Aguillard v. Edwards, 765 F.2d 1251 (CA5 1985). The United States Supreme Court ruled that this law violated the Establishment Clause of the First Amendment because the law was specifically intended to advance a particular religion. In its decision, the court opined that "teaching a variety of scientific theories about the origins of humankind to school children might be validly done with the clear secular intent of enhancing the effectiveness of science instruction."

In support of Aguillard, 72 Nobel Prize-winning scientists, 17 state academies of science, and seven other scientific organizations filed amicus briefs that described creation science as being composed of religious tenets.

== Background ==
Modern American creationism arose from the theological split over modernist higher criticism and its rejection by the fundamentalist Christian movement, which promoted biblical literalism and, post 1920, took up the anti-evolution cause led by William Jennings Bryan. The teaching of evolution had become a common part of the public school curriculum, but his campaign was based on the idea that "Darwinism" had caused German militarism and threatened traditional religion and morality. Several states passed legislation to ban or restrict the teaching of evolution. The Tennessee Butler Act was tested in the Scopes trial of 1925, and continued in effect with the result that many schools did not teach evolution.

When the United States sought to catch up in science during the 1960s with new teaching standards, which reintroduced evolution, the creation science movement arose, presenting what was claimed to be scientific evidence supporting young Earth creationism. Attempts were made to reintroduce legal bans, but the Supreme Court ruled in 1968's Epperson v. Arkansas that bans on teaching evolutionary biology are unconstitutional as they violate the Establishment Clause of the United States Constitution, which forbids the government from advancing a particular religion.

In the early 1980s, several states attempted to introduce creationism alongside the teaching of evolution, and the Louisiana legislature passed a law, authored by State Senator Bill P. Keith of Caddo Parish, entitled the "Balanced Treatment for Creation-Science and Evolution-Science Act." The Act did not require teaching either creationism or evolution, but did require that, if evolutionary science was taught, then "creation science" must be taught as well. Creationists lobbied aggressively for the law. The stated purpose of the Act was to protect "academic freedom". Counsel for the state later admitted at the Supreme Court oral argument that the "legislature may not [have] used the term 'academic freedom' in the correct legal sense. They might have [had] in mind, instead, a basic concept of fairness; teaching all the evidence." Governor David C. Treen signed the bill into law in 1981.

The District Court in Aguillard v. Treen, 634 F. Supp. 426 (ED La.1985), and the Fifth Circuit Court of Appeals, 765 F.2d 1251 (CA5 1985), ruled against Louisiana, finding that its actual purpose in enacting the statute was to promote the religious doctrine of "creation science". An Arkansas District Court previously held in a 1982 decision in McLean v. Arkansas that a similar "balanced treatment" statute violated the Establishment Clause of the First Amendment. Arkansas did not appeal the loss. Creationists believed the statute at issue in Edwards v. Aguillard had a better chance of passing constitutional muster, and so Louisiana appealed its loss in the trial and appellate courts to the Supreme Court.

The case was styled Edwards v. Aguillard because by the time the case reached the Supreme Court, Edwin Edwards had succeeded David Treen as governor of Louisiana, which was being sued, and Don Aguillard, a science teacher and assistant principal at Acadiana High School in Lafayette Parish, Louisiana, was the lead original plaintiff in District Court among a group of Louisiana teachers, students, parents, scientists, and clergy.

== Result ==
On June 19, 1987, the Supreme Court, in a seven-to-two majority opinion written by Justice William J. Brennan, ruled that the Act constituted an unconstitutional infringement on the Establishment Clause of the First Amendment, based on the three-pronged Lemon test, which is:

1. The government's action must have a legitimate secular purpose;
2. The government's action must not have the primary effect of either advancing or inhibiting religion; and
3. The government's action must not result in an "excessive entanglement" of the government and religion.

The Supreme Court held that the Act is facially invalid as violative of the Establishment Clause of the First Amendment, because it lacks a clear secular purpose (first part of the above Lemon test), since (a) the Act does not further its stated secular purpose of "protecting academic freedom", and (b) the Act impermissibly endorses religion by advancing the religious belief that a supernatural being created humankind.

However, it did note that alternative scientific theories could be taught:

We do not imply that a legislature could never require that scientific critiques of prevailing scientific theories be taught. ... Teaching a variety of scientific theories about the origins of humankind to schoolchildren might be validly done with the clear secular intent of enhancing the effectiveness of science instruction.

The Court found that, although the Louisiana legislature had stated that its purpose was to "protect academic freedom", that purpose was dubious because the Act gave Louisiana teachers no freedom they did not already possess and instead limited their ability to determine what scientific principles should be taught. Because it was unconvinced by the state's proffered secular purpose, the Court went on to find that the legislature had a "preeminent religious purpose in enacting this statute".

== Dissent ==
Justice Antonin Scalia, joined by Chief Justice William Rehnquist, dissented, accepting the Act's stated purpose of "protecting academic freedom" as a sincere and legitimate secular purpose. They interpreted the term "academic freedom" to refer to "students' freedom from indoctrination", in this case their freedom "to decide for themselves how life began, based upon a fair and balanced presentation of the scientific evidence". However, they also criticized the first prong of the Lemon test, noting that "to look for the sole purpose of even a single legislator is probably to look for something that does not exist".

== Consequences and aftermath ==
The ruling was one in a series of developments addressing issues related to the American creationist movement and the separation of church and state. The scope of the ruling affected public schools and did not include independent schools, home schools, Sunday schools and Christian schools, which remained free to teach creationism.

During the case, creationists worked on a creationist biology textbook, with the hope of a huge market if the appeal went their way. Drafts were given various titles, including Biology and Creation. After the Edwards v. Aguillard ruling, the authors changed the terms "creation" and "creationists" in the text to "intelligent design" and "design proponents", and the book was published as Of Pandas and People. This supplementary textbook for school use attacked evolutionary biology without mentioning the identity of the "intelligent designer". Promotion of intelligent design creationism by the intelligent design movement eventually led to the textbook's use in a school district being challenged in another court case. Kitzmiller v. Dover Area School District went to trial on September 26, 2005, and was decided in U.S. District Court on December 20, 2005, in favor of the plaintiffs, who charged that a mandate that intelligent design be taught was an unconstitutional establishment of religion. The 139-page opinion of Kitzmiller v. Dover was hailed as a landmark decision, firmly establishing that creationism and intelligent design were religious teachings and not areas of legitimate scientific research. Because the Dover school board chose not to appeal, the case never reached a circuit court or the U.S. Supreme Court.

Wendell Bird served as a special assistant attorney general for Louisiana in the case and later became a staff attorney for the Institute for Creation Research and Association of Christian Schools International. Bird later authored books promoting creationism and teaching it in public schools.

== See also ==
- Scopes trial
- Butler Act
