= Discovery Institute =

U.S. non-profit advocacy group

Coordinates: 47°36′15″N 122°20′00″W

- Abbreviation: DI
- Founded: 1991 (35 years ago)
- Founders: Bruce Chapman and George Gilder
- Type: Nonprofit
- Tax ID no.: 91-1521697
- Legal status: 501(c)(3)
- Purpose: Religious think tank
- Headquarters: 208 Columbia St., Seattle, Washington 98104-1508
- Locations: Seattle, Washington, United States; Dallas, Texas, United States
- President: Steven J. Buri (Note: Buri became president in December 2011.)
- Chairman: Bruce Chapman (Note: Chapman became chairman in 2011.)
- Parent organization: Hudson Institute
- Revenue: $11.8 million (2024)
- Expenses: $13.2 million (2024)
- Staff: 43 (2023)
- Website: www.discovery.org

The Discovery Institute (DI) is a politically conservative think tank that advocates the pseudoscientific notion of intelligent design (ID). It was founded in 1991 in Seattle as a non-profit offshoot of the Hudson Institute.

Its "Teach the Controversy" campaign aims to permit the teaching of anti-evolution, intelligent-design arguments in United States public high school science courses in place of accepted scientific theories, positing that a scientific controversy exists over whether evolution is a reality, when in fact there is none.

== History ==
The institute was cofounded in 1991 by Bruce Chapman and George Gilder as a non-profit educational foundation and think tank. It was started as a branch organization of the Hudson Institute, an Indianapolis-based conservative think tank. It is named after the Royal Navy ship HMS Discovery in which George Vancouver explored Puget Sound in 1792. The organization was incorporated in 1991.

=== Discovery Institute Press ===
Discovery Institute Press is the institute's publishing arm and has published intelligent design books by its fellows including David Berlinski's Deniable Darwin & Other Essays (2010), Jonathan Wells' The Myth of Junk DNA (2011) and an edited volume titled Signature Of Controversy, which contains apologetics in defense of the institute's Center for Science and Culture director Stephen C. Meyer.

=== Physicians and Surgeons for Scientific Integrity ===
The Physicians and Surgeons for Scientific Integrity (PSSI), formally registered as PSSI International Inc., is a United States 501(c)(3) nonprofit anti-evolution organization, based in Clearwater, Florida, promoting the pseudoscience of intelligent design associated with the Discovery Institute. While in the past, the organization sponsored events promoting intelligent design and fundamentalist Christianity, it is currently largely inactive. The PSSI was established in early 2006 by Rich Akin. Geoffrey Simmons, Discovery Institute fellow, is one of the directors of the PSSI.

The PSSI created a public list of medical professionals who dissent from Darwinism. This list is used by the Discovery Institute in its anti-evolution campaigns. The list is used in support of the Discovery Institute claims that intelligent design is scientifically valid while asserting that evolution lacks broad scientific support.

The PSSI, which was active between 2006 and 2008, held a "Doctors Doubting Darwin" rally at the University of South Florida's Sun Dome in September 2006. Attendance was estimated at 3,500 to 4,000 people by a local reporter. Apologetic organizations promoting the event had hoped to fill all 7,700 seats in the Sun Dome. This meeting featured the Discovery Institute's Jonathan Wells and fellow Michael Behe, and received local radio coverage. This rally was opposed by the Florida Citizens for Science.

=== Teach the Controversy ===
Teach the Controversy is a campaign conducted by the Discovery Institute to promote the pseudoscientific principle of intelligent design, a variant of traditional creationism, while attempting to discredit the teaching of evolution in United States public high school science courses.

The scientific community and science education organizations have replied that there is no scientific controversy regarding the validity of evolution and that the controversy is a religious and political one. A federal court, along with the majority of scientific organizations, including the American Association for the Advancement of Science, say the institute has manufactured the controversy they want to teach by promoting a "false perception" that evolution is "a theory in crisis" by falsely claiming it is the subject of wide controversy and debate within the scientific community. In the December 2005 ruling of Kitzmiller v. Dover Area School District, Judge John E. Jones III concluded that intelligent design is not science and "cannot uncouple itself from its creationist, and thus religious, antecedents".

=== Wedge strategy ===
The wedge strategy is a political and social action plan authored by the institute. The strategy was put forth in a Discovery Institute manifesto known as the "Wedge Document". Its goal is to change American culture by shaping public policy to reflect politically conservative, fundamentalist, evangelical Protestant values. The wedge metaphor is attributed to Phillip E. Johnson and depicts a metal wedge splitting a log. In Why Evolution Works (and Creationism Fails) the authors wrote "Although its religious orientation is explicit, the long-term plan outlined in the Wedge Document also displays the Discovery Institute's political agenda very clearly. In ten years, the Wedge strategy was to be extended to ethics, politics, theology; the humanities, and the arts. The ultimate goal of the Discovery Institute is to 'overthrow' materialism and 'renew' American culture to reflect right-wing Christian values."

=== Center for Science and Culture ===
The Center for Science and Culture (CSC), formerly known as the Center for the Renewal of Science and Culture (CRSC), is part of the Discovery Institute, beside other connected sites, such as Mind Matters, operated by the non-profit Walter Bradley Center for Natural and Artificial Intelligence at Discovery Institute. It publishes the blog Evolution News & Science Today (formerly Evolution News & Views and often shortened to Evolution News (EN)), that promotes "a rigorously God-centered view of creation, including a new 'science' based solidly on theism."

=== Center on Wealth & Poverty ===
Robert Marbut, a senior fellow of Discovery Institute's Center on Wealth & Poverty, has appeared on NewsNation.

=== Other issues ===
==== Homelessness ====
The Discovery Institute opposes the Housing First approach, preferring to prioritize treating homeless people for mental illness or drug addiction.

Christopher Rufo, a director at the Discovery Institute, produced policy papers for them that blamed "ideological capture and poor public policy" for the "slow-rolling explosion of homelessness, crime, and addiction" in Seattle.

Caitlin Bassett, a policy analyst for the Discovery Institute has contributed opinion articles that criticize governmental response to homelessness as wasteful and counterproductive to the goal of ending homelessness.

==== 2020 United States presidential election ====
Scott S. Powell, a senior fellow of the Institute, has promoted the false claim that the 2020 United States presidential election was stolen.

=== Climate change ===
The Discovery Institute website has posted articles denying the scientific consensus on climate change.

== See also ==
- Creation and evolution in public education in the United States
- Hudson Institute
- James Tour
- Timeline of intelligent design
