= List of works on intelligent design =

This is a list of works addressing the subject or the themes of intelligent design.

== Non-fiction ==
=== Supportive non-fiction ===
==== Supportive non-fiction books ====
- Ashton, John F, ed. (2001). In Six Days : Why Fifty Scientists Choose to Believe in Creation. Master Books. ISBN 978-0-89051-341-5.
- Ashton, John F, ed. (2001). On the Seventh Day: Forty Scientists and Academics Explain Why They Believe in God. Master Books. ISBN 978-0-89051-376-7.
- Michael J. Behe. Darwin's Black Box: The Biochemical Challenge to Evolution, New York: Free Press, 1996. ISBN 0-684-83493-6
- Michael J. Behe, William A. Dembski, Stephen C. Meyer. Science and Evidence for Design in the Universe (Proceedings of the Wethersfield Institute), Ignatius Press 2000, ISBN 0-89870-809-5
- Michael J. Behe, The Edge of Evolution, Free Press, June 5, 2007, ISBN 0-7432-9620-6
- David Berlinski. The Devil's Delusion: Atheism and its Scientific Pretensions, Basic Books; Reprint edition, 2009, ISBN 0-465-01937-4
- Campbell, John Angus; Stephen C. Meyer, eds. (2004). Darwinism, Design, and Public Education. Rhetoric and Public Affairs Series. East Lansing: Michigan State University Press. ISBN 978-0-87013-675-7. Archived from the original on 2006-09-03.
- Ann Coulter (2006). Godless: The Church of Liberalism. Crown Forum. ISBN 978-1-4000-5420-6. (Attacks evolution. Not a support for Creationism.)
- Percival Davis and Dean H. Kenyon Of Pandas and People: The Central Question of Biological Origins 1989 (2nd edition 1993) ISBN 0-914513-40-0
- William A. Dembski. Intelligent Design: The Bridge Between Science & Theology, InterVarsity Press 1999. ISBN 0-8308-1581-3
- William A. Dembski, James M. Kushiner. Signs of Intelligence: Understanding Intelligent Design, Brazos Press, 2001, ISBN 1-58743-004-5
- William A. Dembski, John Wilson. Uncommon Dissent: Intellectuals Who Find Darwinism Unconvincing, ISI Press, 2004. ISBN 1-932236-31-7
- William A. Dembski and Jonathan Wells, The Design of Life, Foundation for Thought and Ethics, November 19, 2007.
- William A. Dembski, The Design Revolution: Answering the Toughest Questions About Intelligent Design (Foreword by Charles W. Colson). Inter Varsity Press. 2004, ISBN 0-8308-2375-1
- William A. Dembski, The Design Inference: Eliminating Chance through Small Probabilities (Cambridge Studies in Probability, Induction and Decision Theory), Cambridge University Press, 2006.
- William A. Dembski, No Free Lunch: Why Specified Complexity Cannot Be Purchased without Intelligence (2007), ISBN 0-7425-5810-X
- William A. Dembski, The Design of Life: Discovering Signs of Intelligence in Biological Systems, ISI Distributed Titles; 1st edition (September 5, 2008)
- William A. Dembski and Sean McDowell, Understanding Intelligent Design: Everything You Need to Know in Plain Language
- William A. Dembski, Intelligent Design Uncensored: An Easy-to-Understand Guide to the Controversy, IVP Books, 2010
- Michael Denton. Evolution: A Theory In Crisis, Adler & Adler; 3rd edition, 1986, ISBN 0-917561-52-X
- Michael Denton. Nature's Destiny: How the Laws of Biology Reveal Purpose in the Universe, 2002
- Michael Pitman. Adam and Evolution, Rider & Co; First Edition, 1984, ISBN 0-09-155390-3
- James H. Feldstein, Intelligent Design?
- Antony Flew. There Is a God: How the World's Most Notorious Atheist Changed His Mind, HarperOne, 2008, ISBN 0-06-133530-4
- Steve Fuller. Science vs Religion? Intelligent Design and the Problem of Evolution. Polity Books. 2007, ISBN 0-7456-4122-9.
- Steve Fuller. Dissent Over Descent: Evolution's 500-year War on Intelligent Design. Icon Books Ltd. 2008, ISBN 1-84046-804-1
- James Gills. Darwinism Under The Microscope: How recent scientific evidence points to divine design, Charisma House, 2002, ISBN 0-88419-925-8
- Werner Gitt. In the Beginning Was Information: A Scientist Explains the Incredible Design in Nature, Master Books, 2006, ISBN 0-89051-461-5
- Guillermo Gonzalez and Jay Richards, The Privileged Planet: How Our Place in the Cosmos is Designed for Discovery Regnery Publishing 2006
- Cornelius G. Hunter, (2002). Darwin's God: Evolution and the Problem of Evil, Brazos Press. ISBN 1587430533
- Phillip E. Johnson. Darwin on Trial, Washington, D.C.: Regnery Gateway, 1991. ISBN 0-8308-1324-1
- Phillip E. Johnson. Defeating Darwinism by opening minds, Downers Grove, Ill.: InterVarsity Press, 1997. ISBN 0-8308-1362-4
- Phillip E. Johnson. Evolution as dogma: the establishment of naturalism, Dallas, Tex.: Haughton Pub. Co., 1990
- Stephen C. Meyer, Scott Minnich, Jonathan Moneymaker, Paul A. Nelson, and Ralph Seelke, Explore Evolution: The Arguments for and Against Neo-Darwinism, Hill House Publishers Pty. Ltd., Melbourne and London, 2007, ISBN 0-947352-47-3.
- Stephen C. Meyer. Signature in the Cell: DNA and the Evidence for Intelligent Design. New York: HarperOne (June 23, 2009) ISBN 0-06-147278-6
- Stephen C. Meyer. Darwin's Doubt: The Explosive Origin of Animal Life and the Case for Intelligent Design. New York: HarperOne (June 10, 2013) ISBN 0-06-207147-5
- Bradley Monton. Seeking God in Science: An Atheist Defends Intelligent Design, Broadview Press; 1 edition, 2009, ISBN 1-55111-863-7
- J. P. Moreland. The Creation Hypothesis: Scientific Evidence for an Intelligent Designer, IVP Books, 1994, ISBN 0-8308-1698-4
- Robert G. Neuhauser. The Cosmic Deity: Where Scientists and Theologians Fear to Tread, Mill Creek Publishers, 2004, ISBN 0-9759043-0-2
- Denyse O'Leary, By Design or By Chance? The Growing Controversy on the Origins of Life in the Universe, Augsburg Books, June 2004, ISBN 0-8066-5177-6
- Mark Ludwig. Computer Viruses, Artificial Life and Evolution: The Little Black Book of Computer Viruses, Amer Eagle Pubns Inc, 1993, ISBN 0-929408-07-1
- Dean L. Overman, A Case Against Accident and Self-Organization, Rowman & Littlefield Publishers, 1997, ISBN 0-8476-8966-2
- Paley, William (1809). Natural Theology: or, Evidences of the Existence and Attributes of the Deity (12th ed.). London: Printed for J. Faulder. Online in full. (pdf of first section)
- Nancy Pearcey (2004). Total Truth: Liberating Christianity from its Cultural Captivity. Crossway Books. ISBN 978-1-58134-458-5.
- A.C. Bhaktivedanta Swami Prabhupada. Life Comes From Life, Bhaktivedanta Book Trust ISBN 0-89213-100-4 (ID from the Vedic Perspective)
- Rael. Intelligent Design: Message from the Designers, Nova Distribution, 2006, ISBN 2-940252-22-X
- Fazale Rana. The Cell's Design: How Chemistry Reveals the Creator's Artistry, Baker Books, 2008, ISBN 0-8010-6827-4
- Hugh Ross. Beyond the Cosmos, Signalman Publishing, 2010, ISBN 978-0-9840614-8-8
- Hugh Ross. Why the Universe is the Way it Is, Grand Rapids, MI: Baker Books, 2008, ISBN 978-0801071966
- John C. Sanford. Genetic Entropy and the Mystery of the Genome, Feed My Sheep Foundation, Inc, 2008, ISBN 0-9816316-0-6
- Geoffrey Simmons, William Dembski. What Darwin Didn't Know, Harvest House Publishers, 2004, ISBN 0-7369-1313-0
- Markus Rammerstorfer (2006). Nur eine Illusion? Biologie und Design. Marburg: Tectum-Verl. ISBN 978-3-8288-9117-3.
- Philip Snow. Design and Origin of Birds, Day One Publications, 2006, ISBN 1-84625-002-1
- Lee Strobel. The Case for a Creator, Zondervan, 2004, ISBN 0-310-24144-8
- David Swift. Evolution Under the Microscope, Leighton Academic Press, 2002, ISBN 0-9543589-0-2
- Charles Thaxton and Walter Bradley. The Mystery of Life's Origin: Reassessing Current Theories, Philosophical Library, January 19, 1984, ISBN 0-8022-2447-4
- Thomas E. Woodward. Doubts About Darwin: A History of Intelligent Design, Baker Books, 1993, ISBN 0-8010-6443-0
- Thomas E. Woodward. Darwin Strikes Back (2006), ISBN 978-0801065637
- Wells, Jonathan (2002). Icons of Evolution. Regnery Publishing. ISBN 978-0-89526-200-4.
- Jonathan Wells (2006). The Politically Incorrect Guide to Darwinism and Intelligent Design. Washington, DC: Regnery Publishing. ISBN 978-1-59698-013-6.
- Jonathan Wells (2011). The Myth of Junk DNA. Discovery Institute Press.

==== Supportive non-fiction anthologies ====
- John Angus Campbell, Stephen C. Meyer ed. Darwinism, Design and Public Education, Michigan State University Press, December 2003, ISBN 0-87013-670-4
  - Why Are We Still Debating Darwinism? Why Not Teach the Controversy? John Angus Campbell
  - PART I—Should Darwinism Be Presented Critically and Comparatively in the Public Schools? Philosophical, Educational, and Legal Issues
    - Intelligent Design, Darwinism, and the Philosophy of Public Education, John Angus Campbell
    - Intelligent Design Theory, Religion, and the Science Curriculum, Warren A. Nord
    - Teaching the Controversy: Is It Science, Religion, or Speech? David DeWolf, Stephen C. Meyer, and Mark E. DeForrest
  - PART II—Scientific Critique of Biology Textbooks and Contemporary Evolutionary Theory
    - The Meanings of Evolution, Stephen C. Meyer and Michael Newton Keas
    - The Deniable Darwin, David Berlinski
    - Haeckel's Embryos and Evolution: Setting the Record Straight, Jonathan Wells
    - Second Thoughts about Peppered Moths, Jonathan Wells
    - Where Do We Come From? A Humbling Look at the Biology of Life's Origin, Massimo Pigliucci
    - Origin of Life and Evolution in Biology Textbooks: A Critique, Gordon C. Mills, Malcolm Lancaster, and Walter L. Bradley
  - PART III—The Theory of Intelligent Design: A Scientific Alternative to Neo-Darwinian and/or Chemical Evolutionary Theories
    - DNA and the Origin of Life: Information, Specification, and Explanation, Stephen C. Meyer
    - Design in the Details: The Origin of Biomolecular Machines, Michael J. Behe
    - Homology in Biology: Problem for Naturalistic Science and Prospect for Intelligent Design, Paul Nelson and Jonathan Wells
    - The Cambrian Explosion: Biology's Big Bang, Stephen C. Meyer, Marcus Ross, Paul Nelson, and Paul Chien
    - Reinstating Design within Science, William A. Dembski
  - PART IV—Critical Responses
    - The Rhetoric of Intelligent Design: Alternatives for Science and Religion, Celeste Michelle Condit
    - Intelligent Design and Irreducible Complexity: A Rejoinder, David Depew
    - Biochemical Complexity: Emergence or Design? Bruce H. Weber
    - Pigliucci, Massimo. "Design Yes, Intelligent No: A Critique of Intelligent Design Theory and Neo-Creationism". Skeptical Inquirer. 25 (5). Archived from the original on January 19, 2005 – via FindArticles.
    - On Behalf of the Fool, Michael Ruse
    - Rhetorical Arguments and Scientific Arguments: Do My Children Have to Listen to More Arguments against Evolution? Eugene Garver
    - Design? Yes! But Is It Intelligent? William Provine
    - Creation and Evolution: A Modest Proposal, Alvin Plantinga
    - Thinking Pedagogically about Design, John Lyne
    - An Intelligent Person's Guide to Intelligent Design Theory Steve Fuller
    - The Rhetorical Problem of Intelligent Design, Phillip E. Johnson
  - Appendixes
    - A. U.S. Commission on Civil Rights Hearing: On Curriculum Controversies in Biology, 21 August 1998
    - B. Helping Schools to Teach Evolution, Donald Kennedy
    - C. Stratigraphic First Appearance of Phyla-Body Plans
    - D. Stratigraphic First Appearance of Phyla-Subphyla Body Plans
    - E. Probability of Other Body Plans Originating in the Cambrian Explosion
- Dembski, William (ed) (September 1998). Mere Creation: Science, Faith & Intelligent Design. InterVarsity Press. p. 475 pages. ISBN 978-0-8308-1515-9. An anthology of papers from the November 1996 conference of the same name, sponsored by Christian Leadership Ministries.
  - Introduction, William Dembski
  - Part 1,"Unseating Naturalism," Walter Bradley, Jonathan Wells
  - Part 2, "Design Theory," Nancy Pearcey, William Dembski, Steve Meyer, Paul Nelson
  - Part 3, "Biological Design," Michael Behe, Siegfried Scherer, Sigrid Hartwig-Scherer, Jeff Schloss
  - Part 4, "Philosophy and Design," J.P. Moreland, Del Ratzsch, John Mark Reynolds, Bill Craig
  - Part 5, "Design in the Universe," Hugh Ross, Robert Kaita, David Berlinski, Robert Newman
  - Concluding essays, Phillip E. Johnson, Bruce Chapman

==== Supportive non-fiction papers and articles ====
- Michael Behe. A Response to Critics of Darwin's Black Box
- William A. Dembski. Becoming a Disciplined Science: Prospects, Pitfalls, and Reality Check for ID
- William A. Dembski. Searching Large Spaces—Displacement and the No Free Lunch Regress

==== Supportive non-fiction films ====
- The Privileged Planet
- Unlocking the Mystery of Life
- Expelled: No Intelligence Allowed
- Darwin's Dilemma
- The Information Enigma
- Metamorphosis: The Beauty and Design of Butterflies
- Flight: The Genius of Birds
- Living Waters: Intelligent Design in the Oceans of the Earth

=== Neutral non-fiction ===
==== Neutral non-fiction books ====
- David L. Bender (1988). Science and Religion; Opposing Viewpoints. St. Paul, Minnesota: Greenhaven Press. ISBN 0-89908-406-0
- Carl Johan Calleman (2009). The Purposeful Universe: How Quantum Theory and Mayan Cosmology Explain the Origin and Evolution of Life. Bear & Company. ISBN 1-59143-104-2
- Michael Corey (2007). The God Hypothesis: Discovering Design in Our Just Right Goldilocks Universe. Rowman & Littlefield Publishers. ISBN 0-7425-5889-4
- Paul Davies (2007). Cosmic Jackpot The Goldilocks Enigma: Why is the Universe Just Right for Life?. ISBN 978-0-618-59226-5
- James Le Fanu (2009). Why Us?: How Science Rediscovered the Mystery of Ourselves. Pantheon. ISBN 0-375-42198-X
- Jerry Fodor and Massimo Piattelli-Palmarini. (2011) What Darwin Got Wrong. Picador; Reprint edition ISBN 0-312-68066-X
- James N. Gardner (2003). Biocosm: The New Scientific Theory of Evolution: Intelligent Life Is the Architect of the Universe. Inner Ocean Publishing. ISBN 1-930722-26-5
- Brian Goodwin (2001). How the Leopard Changed its Spots: The Evolution of Complexity. Princeton University Press. ISBN 0-691-08809-8
- Amit Goswami (2008). Creative Evolution: A Physicist's Resolution Between Darwinism and Intelligent Design. Quest Books; 1st Quest Ed edition. ISBN 0-8356-0858-1
- George Greenstein (1988). The Symbiotic Universe: Life and mind in the Cosmos. Morrow. ISBN 0-688-07604-1
- Bernard Haisch (2010). The Purpose-Guided Universe: Believing In Einstein, Darwin, and God. New Page Books; 1 edition. ISBN 1-60163-122-7
- Francis Hitching (1983). The Neck of the Giraffe or Where Darwin Went Wrong. Signet. ISBN 0-451-62232-4
- Mae-Wan Ho (1984). Beyond Neo-Darwinism: An Introduction to the New Evolutionary Paradigm. Academic Pr. ISBN 0-12-350080-X
- Ervin Laszlo (1987). Evolution: The Grand Synthesis. Shambhala. ISBN 0-87773-389-9
- Lebo, Lauri (May 13, 2008). The Devil in Dover: An Insider's Story of Dogma v. Darwin in Small-town America. New Press. p. 256 pages. ISBN 978-1-59558-208-9.
- Albert Low (2008). The Origin of Human Nature: A Zen Buddhist Looks at Evolution. Sussex Academic Pr. ISBN 1-84519-260-5
- Richard Milton (2000). Shattering the Myths of Darwinism. Park Street Press. ISBN 0-89281-884-0
- Norman Macbeth (1971). Darwin Retried. Boston: Harvard Common Press
- Johnjoe McFadden (2002). Quantum Evolution: How Physics' Weirdest Theory Explains Life's Biggest Mystery. W. W. Norton and Company. ISBN 0-393-32310-2
- Numbers, Ronald L. (2006). The Creationists: from scientific creationism to intelligent design. Cambridge, Mass.: Harvard University Press. ISBN 978-0-674-02339-0. OCLC 69734583.
- Humes, Edward (2008). Monkey girl : evolution, education, religion, and the battle for America's soul. New York: Harper Perennial. ISBN 978-0-06-088549-6. OCLC 156815003.
- Robert G. B. Reid (1985). Evolutionary Theory: The Unfinished Synthesis. Cornell Univ Pr. ISBN 0-8014-1831-3
- Stanley Salthe (1993). Development and Evolution: Complexity and Change in Biology. The MIT Press. ISBN 0-262-51383-8
- James A. Shapiro (2011). Evolution: A View from the 21st Century. ISBN 0-13-278093-3
- Robert Shapiro (1986). Origins; A Skeptic's Guide to the Creation of Life on Earth. New York, N.Y.: Summit
- Lee Spetner (1998). Not by Chance!: Shattering the Modern Theory of Evolution. Judaica Press. ISBN 1-880582-24-4
- David Stove (2006). Darwinian Fairytales: Selfish Genes, Errors of Heredity and Other Fables of Evolution. ISBN 1-59403-140-1
- Gordon Rattray Taylor (1984). The Great Evolution Mystery. Publisher Abacus. ISBN 0-349-12917-7
- Duane Thurman (1978). How To Think About Evolution. Downers Grove, Illinois: The InterVarsity Press. ISBN 0-87784-701-0
- Hubert Yockey (2011). Information Theory, Evolution, and The Origin of Life. Cambridge University Press; Reissue edition. ISBN 0-521-16958-5

==== Neutral non-fiction anthologies ====
- Robert Pennock ed. Intelligent Design Creationism and its Critics: Philosophical, Theological, and Scientific Perspectives, MIT Press (2002). ISBN 0-262-66124-1
1. Intelligent Design Creationism's "Wedge Strategy"
  1. The Wedge at Work: How Intelligent Design Creationism is Wedging Its Way into the Cultural and Academic Mainstream, by Barbara Forrest
2. Johnson's Critique of Evolutionary Naturalism
  1. Evolution as Dogma: The Establishment of Naturalism, by Phillip E. Johnson
  2. Naturalism, Evidence and Creationism: The Case of Phillip Johnson, by Robert T. Pennock
  3. Response to Pennock by Phillip E. Johnson
  4. Reply: Johnson's Reason in the Balance, by Robert T. Pennock
3. A Theological Conflict?: Evolution vs. the Bible
  1. When Faith and Reason Clash: Evolution and the Bible, by Alvin Plantinga
  2. When Faith and Reason Cooperate, by Howard J. Van Till
  3. Plantinga's Defense of Special Creation, by Ernan McMullin
  4. Evolution, Neutrality, and Antecedent Probability: A Reply to McMullin and Van Till, by Alvin Plantinga
4. Intelligent Design's Scientific Claims
  1. Molecular Machines: Experimental Support for the Design Inference, by Michael J. Behe
  2. Born Again Creationism, by Philip Kitcher
  3. Biology Remystified: The Scientific Claims of the New Creationists, by Matthew J. Brauer & Daniel R. Brumbaugh
5. Plantinga's Critique of Naturalism & Evolution
  1. Methodological Naturalism?, by Alvin Plantinga
  2. Methodological Naturalism Under Attack, by Michael Ruse
  3. Plantinga's Case Against Naturalistic Epistemology, by Evan Fales
  4. Plantinga's Probability Arguments Against Evolutionary Naturalism, by Branden Fitelson & Elliott Sober
6. Intelligent Design Creationism vs. Theistic Evolutionism
  1. Creator or "Blind Watchmaker?", by Phillip E. Johnson
  2. Phillip Johnson on Trial: A Critique of His Critique of Darwin, by Nancey Murphy
  3. Welcoming the 'Disguised Friend' – Darwinism and Divinity, by Arthur Peacocke
  4. The Creation: Intelligently Designed or Optimally Equipped?, by Howard J. Van Till
  5. Is Theism Compatible with Evolution?, by Roy Clouser
7. Intelligent Design and Information
  1. Is Genetic Information Irreducible?, by Phillip E. Johnson
  2. Reply to Phillip Johnson, by Richard Dawkins
  3. Reply to Johnson, by George C. Williams
  4. Intelligent Design as a Theory of Information, by William A. Dembski
  5. Information and the Argument from Design, by Peter Godfrey-Smith
  6. How Not to Detect Design, by Branden Fitelson, Christopher Stephens & Elliott Sober
  7. The 'Information Challenge', by Richard Dawkins
8. Intelligent Design Theorists Turn the Tables
  1. Who's Got the Magic?, by William A. Dembski
  2. The Wizards of ID: Reply to Dembski, by Robert T. Pennock
  3. The Panda's Peculiar Thumb, by Stephen Jay Gould
  4. The Role of Theology in Current Evolutionary Reasoning, by Paul A. Nelson
  5. Appealing to Ignorance Behind the Cloak of Ambiguity, by Kelly C. Smith
  6. Nonoverlapping Magisteria, by Stephen Jay Gould
9. Creationism and Education
  1. Why Creationism Should Not Be Taught in the Public Schools, by Robert T. Pennock
  2. Creation and Evolution: A Modest Proposal, by Alvin Plantinga
  3. Reply to Plantinga's 'Modest Proposal', by Robert T. Pennock
- Michael Ruse and William Dembski (eds) Debating Design. New York: Cambridge University Press, (pp. 130 – 148, 2004)
  - Introduction: general introduction, by William Dembski and Michael Ruse
  The argument from design: a brief history Michael Ruse
  Who's afraid of ID?: a survey of the intelligent design movement Angus Menuge
  - Part I. Darwinism:
  1 Design without a designer: Darwin's greatest discovery Francisco J. Ayala
  2 The flagellum unspun: the collapse of 'irreducible complexity' Kenneth Miller
  3 The design argument Elliott Sober
  4 DNA by design? Stephen Meyer and the return of the god hypothesis Robert T. Pennock
  - Part II. Complex Self-Organization:
  5. Prolegomenon to a general biology Stuart Kauffman
  6. Darwinism, design and complex systems dynamics David Depew and Bruce Weber
  7. Emergent complexity, teleology, and the arrow of time Paul Davies
  8. The emergence of biological value James Barham
  - Part III. Theistic Evolution:
  9. Darwin, design and divine providence John Haught
  10. The inbuilt potentiality of creation John Polkinghorne
  11. Theistic evolution Keith Ward
  12. Intelligent design: some geological, historical and theological questions Michael Roberts
  13. The argument from laws of nature reassessed Richard Swinburne
  - Part IV. Intelligent Design:
  14. The logical underpinnings of intelligent design William Dembski
  15. Information, entropy and the origin of life Walter Bradley
  16. Irreducible complexity: obstacle to Darwinian evolution Michael Behe
  17. The Cambrian information explosion: evidence for intelligent design, Stephen Meyer.

==== Neutral non-fiction papers and articles ====
- Ankerberg, John. Increasing doubts about evolution (lists scientists who are not ID advocates who oppose Darwinism).
- Bird, Wendell R. The Yale Law Journal, Vol. 87, No. 3, Jan, 1978
- Bird, Wendell R. "Freedom From Establishment and Unneutrality in Public School Instruction and Religious School Regulation." Harvard Journal of Law and Public Policy, Vol. 2, June 1979, pp. 125–205
- Bhattarcharjee, Y. (2006). "Science education - Evolution trumps intelligent design in Kansas vote". Science. 313 (5788): 743. doi:10.1126/science.313.5788.743. PMID 16902095. S2CID 60676345.
- Bleckman, Charles A. (2006). "Evolution and creationism in Science: 1880-2000". BioScience. 56 (2): 151–158. doi:10.1641/0006-3568(2006)056[0151:EACIS]2.0.CO;2.
- Burian, Richard. Challenges to the Evolutionary Synthesis Virginia Polytechnic Institute and State University
- Edward Goldsmith. Evolution, neo-Darwinism and the paradigm of science The Ecologist Vol. 20 No. 2, March–April 1990
- Levit, Georgy S. (2008). "Alternative evolutionary theories: A historical survey". Journal of Bioeconomics. 10: 71–96. doi:10.1007/s10818-008-9032-y. S2CID 145540549.
- Marris, Emma (2006). "Intelligent design verdict set to sway other cases". Nature. 439 (7072): 6–7. Bibcode:2006Natur.439....6M. doi:10.1038/439006b. PMID 16397467.
- Mervis, Jeffrey (January 2005). "Dover Teachers Want No Part of Intelligent-Design Statement". Science. 307 (5709): 505. doi:10.1126/science.307.5709.505. PMID 15681360. S2CID 22736290.
- Richard Milton. Neo-Darwinism: time to reconsider Times Higher Education Supplement, 1995
- Staune, Jean. Darwinism Design and Purpose: A European Perspective Institutional Affiliation: General Secretary, Université Interdiciplinare de Paris

=== Critical non-fiction ===
==== Critical non-fiction books ====
- Ayala, Francisco J. (2006). Darwin and Intelligent Design. Facets Series. Fortress Press. ISBN 978-0-8006-3802-3.
- Brockman, John (ed.) (2006). Intelligent thought. Science versus the intelligent design movement. New York, New York: Vintage. ISBN 978-0-307-27722-0.
- Claramonte, Vicente (2009). La cientificidad del diseño inteligente. Tirant lo Blanch. ISBN 978-84-9876-165-8.
- Richard Dawkins. The Blind Watchmaker: Why the Evidence of Evolution Reveals a Universe Without Design, W. W. Norton & Company (1996). ISBN 0-393-31570-3
- Richard Dawkins. The God Delusion, Houghton Mifflin (October 18, 2006). ISBN 0-618-68000-4
- Richard Dawkins. The Greatest Show on Earth: The Evidence for Evolution (2009) ISBN 978-1416594789
- Barbara Forrest and Paul R. Gross. Creationism's Trojan Horse: The Wedge of Intelligent Design, Oxford University Press (2004). ISBN 0-19-515742-7
- Foster, John Bellamy; Brett Clark; Richard York (2008). Critique of Intelligent Design: Materialism Versus Creationism from Antiquity to the Present. New York: Monthly Review Press. ISBN 978-1-58367-173-3.
- Isaak, Mark (2005). The Counter-Creationism Handbook. Greenwood Press. ISBN 978-0-313-33305-7.
- Ernst Mayr. One Long Argument: Charles Darwin and the Genesis of Modern Evolutionary Thought, Harvard University Press (1993). ISBN 0-674-63906-5
- Kenneth R. Miller. Finding Darwin's God, HarperCollins (1999). ISBN 0-06-093049-7
- National Academy of Sciences. Science and Creationism, National Academies Press (1999). ISBN 0-309-06406-6
- Chris Mooney. The Republican War on Science, Basic Books (2005). ISBN 0-465-04676-2
- Robert Pennock. Tower of Babel: The Evidence against the New Creationism, MIT Press (1999). ISBN 0-262-66165-9
- Mark Perakh. Unintelligent Design, Prometheus (Dec 2003). ISBN 1-59102-084-0
- Andrew J. Petto (Editor), Laurie R. Godfrey (Editor). Scientists Confront Intelligent Design and Creationism, W. W. Norton (2007). ISBN 0-393-05090-4
- Massimo Pigliucci. Denying Evolution: Creationism, Scientism, and the Nature of Science, Sinauer Associates, Incorporated (2002). ISBN 0-87893-659-9
- Michael Shermer, Why Darwin Matters: The Case Against Intelligent Design (2007). ISBN 9780805083064
- Niall Shanks. God, the Devil, and Darwin: A Critique of Intelligent Design Theory, Oxford University Press (2004). ISBN 0-19-516199-8
- Robyn Williams. Unintelligent Design, Why God isn't as smart as she thinks she is, Allen & Unwin (2006). ISBN 978-1-74114-923-4
- Matt Young, Taner Edis eds. Why Intelligent Design Fails: A Scientific Critique of the New Creationism, Rutgers University Press (2004). ISBN 0-8135-3433-X
- Joan Roughgarden Evolution and Christian Faith: Reflections of an Evolutionary Biologist Island Press (August 1, 2006) ISBN 1-59726-098-3
- Francis Collins The Language of God Free Press (July 17, 2007) ISBN 1-4165-4274-4

==== Critical non-fiction anthologies ====
- Scott, Eugenie (October 1, 2006). Glenn Branch (ed.). Not in Our Classrooms. Beacon Press. p. 171 pages. ISBN 978-0-8070-3278-7.
  - Foreword by Barry W. Lynn
  - 1. The Once and Future Intelligent Design, by Eugenie C. Scott
  - 2. Analyzing "Critical Analysis", by Nicholas J. Matzke and Paul R. Gross
  - 3. Theology, Religion, and Intelligent Design, by Martinez Hewlett and Ted Peters
  - 4. From the Classroom to the Courtroom: Intelligent Design and the Constitution, by Jay D. Wexler
  - 5 When the Classroom Door Closes, Who Teaches Evolution?, by Brian Alters
  - 6 Defending the Teaching of Evolution, by Glenn Branch and the staff of the National Center for Science Education

==== Critical non-fiction papers and articles ====
- Attie, Alan D.; Elliott Sober; Ronald L. Numbers; Richard M. Amasino; Beth Cox; Terese Berceau; Thomas Powell; Michael M. Cox (2006). "Defending science education against intelligent design: a call to action". Journal of Clinical Investigation. 116 (5): 1134–1138. doi:10.1172/JCI28449. PMC 1451210. PMID 16670753.
- Bauer, D.R. (2006). "Resolving the controversy over "teaching the controversy": The constitutionality of teaching intelligent design in public schools". Fordham Law Review. 75 (2): 1019–1063.
- Beja, A. (2006). "The judge and "intelligent design" in the United States". Esprit (6): 181–184.
- Bland, M. (2005). "Intelligent design: the response". Physics World. 18 (12): 19. doi:10.1088/2058-7058/18/10/27.
- Branch, Glenn (March 2007). "Understanding Creationism after Kitzmiller". BioScience. 57 (3): 278–284. doi:10.1641/B570313.
- Frederick C. Crews. Saving Us from Darwin, The New York Review of Books, Vol 48, No 15 (4 October 2001).
- Frederick C. Crews. Saving Us from Darwin, Part II, The New York Review of Books, Vol 48, No 16 (18 October 2001).
- Fitelson, Branden; Elliott Sober (1998). "Plantinga's Probability Arguments Against Evolutionary Naturalism" (PDF). Pacific Philosophical Quarterly. 79 (2): 115–129. doi:10.1111/1468-0114.00053. Archived from the original (PDF) on 2007-06-28.
- Fitelson, Branden; Christopher Stephens; Elliott Sober (1999). "How Not to Detect Design--- A Review of William Dembski's The Design Inference" (PDF). Philosophy of Science. 66 (3): 472–488. doi:10.1086/392699. S2CID 11079658. Archived from the original (PDF) on 2009-02-25.
- Forrest, Barbara (December 2004). "Darwinism, Design, and Public Education. John Angus Campbell and Stephen C. Meyer, eds". Integrative and Comparative Biology. 44 (6): 510–513. doi:10.1093/icb/44.6.510.
- Forrest, Barbara (May 2007). "Understanding the intelligent design creationist movement: Its true nature and goals" (PDF). Center for Inquiry, Washington DC. Archived from the original (PDF) on 2011-05-19.
- Forrest, Barbara; Paul R. Gross (2007). "Biochemistry by design". Trends in Biochemical Sciences. 32 (7): 322–331. doi:10.1016/j.tibs.2007.06.001. PMID 17570673.
- Häggström, Olle (2007). "Intelligent Design and the NFL theorems". Biology and Philosophy. 22 (2): 217–230. CiteSeerX 10.1.1.592.6440. doi:10.1007/s10539-006-9040-z. S2CID 84688022.
- Hildebrand, David L. (2006). "Does every theory deserve a hearing? Evolution, intelligent design, and the limits of democratic inquiry". Southern Journal of Philosophy. 44 (2): 217–236. doi:10.1111/j.2041-6962.2006.tb00099.x. ISSN 0038-4283.
- Lutz, Sebastian (2012). "Empiricism and Intelligent Design II: Analyzing Intelligent Design". Erkenntnis. 78 (3): 681–698. doi:10.1007/s10670-012-9392-5. S2CID 6311126.
- Neill, Ushma S.; Andrew R. Marks (May 2006). "Why we think it is important to discuss intelligent design". Journal of Clinical Investigation. 116 (5): 1133. doi:10.1172/JCI28483. PMC 1451211. PMID 16670752.
- Nurse, Paul (2006). "US Biomedical Research under Siege". Cell. 124 (1): 9–12. doi:10.1016/j.cell.2005.12.029. PMID 16413473.
- Morowitz, Harold; Robert Hazen; James Trefil (September 2, 2005). "Intelligent Design Has No Place in the Science Curriculum". Chronicle of Higher Education.
- Robert Pennock. DNA by Design?: Stephen Meyer and the Return of the God Hypothesis. In Ruse, Michael and William Dembski (eds) Debating Design. New York: Cambridge University Press, (pp. 130 – 148, 2004)
- Robert Pennock. Critique of Philip Johnson. In Parsons, Keith (ed.) The Science Wars: Debating Scientific Knowledge and Technology. Prometheus Press. (pp. 277–306, 2003)
- Robert Pennock. Creationism and Intelligent Design. Annual Review of Genomics and Human Genetics. (Vol. 4: 143-163, Sept. 2003)
- Robert Pennock. Should Creationism be Taught in the Public Schools? Science & Education (Vol.11 no.2, March 2002, pp. 111–133)
- Robert Pennock. Whose God? What Science? Reply to Michael Behe. In Reports of the National Center for Science Education. (Vol. 21 No. 3-4 pp. 16–19, May-Aug. 2001)
- Robert Pennock. Lions and Tigers and APES, Oh My!: Creationism vs. Evolution in Kansas. Science Teaching & The Search for Origin: Kansas Teach-In. AAAS Dialogue on Science and Religion. (2000)
- Robert Pennock. The Wizards of ID: Reply to Dembski. Metanexus (No. 089, Oct. 11, 2000)
- Robert Pennock. Of Design and Deception: Kansas, Conflict & Creationism. Science & Spirit (Nov./Dec. 1999)
- Robert Pennock. Untitled—Reply to Phillip Johnson re: Tower of Babel. Books and Culture (Sept./Oct. 1999)
- Robert Pennock. The Prospects for a Theistic Science. Perspectives on Science and Christian Faith (Vol. 50, No. 3, pp. 205–209, Sept. 1998)
- Robert Pennock. Creationism's War on Science. Environmental Review (Vol. 5, No. 2, pp. 7 – 16, February 1998)
- Robert Pennock. Naturalism, Creationism and the Meaning of Life: The Case of Phillip Johnson Revisited. Creation/Evolution (Vol. 16, No. 2, pp. 10–30, Winter 1996)
- Robert Pennock. Reply to Johnson - Johnson's Reason in the Balance. Biology & Philosophy (Vol. 11, No. 4, pp. 565–568, 1996)
- Robert Pennock. Naturalism, Evidence and Creationism: The Case of Phillip Johnson. Biology and Philosophy (Vol. 11, No. 4, pp. 543–559, 1996)
- Pigliucci, Massimo (December 2005). "More than you ever wanted to know about intelligent design". Evolution. 59 (12): 2717–2720. doi:10.1554/BR05-12.1. S2CID 198157850.
- Rosenhouse, Jason; Glenn Branch (2006). "Media coverage of "intelligent design"". BioScience. 56 (3): 247–252. doi:10.1641/0006-3568(2006)056[0247:MCOID]2.0.CO;2.
- Scott, Eugenie C. (1996). "Creationism, Ideology and Science". Annals of the New York Academy of Sciences. 775 (1): 505–522. doi:10.1111/j.1749-6632.1996.tb23167.x. S2CID 84085243.
- Scott, Eugenie C (1997). "Antievolution and Creationism in the United States". Annual Review of Anthropology. 26 (1): 263–289. doi:10.1146/annurev.anthro.26.1.263. JSTOR 2952523. S2CID 146271838.
- Scott, Eugenie C. (2006). "Creationism and evolution: It's the American way". Cell. 124 (3): 449–451. doi:10.1016/j.cell.2006.01.028. PMID 16469687.
- Scott, Eugenie C.; Glenn Branch (2003). "Evolution: what's wrong with 'teaching the controversy'". Trends in Ecology and Evolution. 18 (10): 499–502. doi:10.1016/S0169-5347(03)00218-0.
- Scott, Eugenie C.; Glenn Branch (2004). "Teaching the controversy: Response to Langen and to Meyer". Trends in Ecology and Evolution. 19 (3): 116–117. doi:10.1016/j.tree.2004.01.004.
- Sober, Elliott (2002). "Intelligent Design and Probability Reasoning" (PDF). International Journal for the Philosophy of Religion. 52 (2): 65–80. doi:10.1023/A:1019579220694. S2CID 26802074. Archived from the original (PDF) on 2007-06-28.
- Sober, Elliott (2007). "What Is Wrong with Intelligent Design?" (PDF). Quarterly Review of Biology. 82 (1): 3–8. CiteSeerX 10.1.1.153.1827. doi:10.1086/511656. PMID 17354991. S2CID 44420203. Archived from the original (PDF) on 2007-07-24.
- Wexler, Jay D. (Fall 2009). "Intelligent Design and Judicial Minimalism: Further Thoughts on the 'Is it Science' Question". University of St. Thomas Journal of Law and Public Policy. 4 (1): 30.
- Wexler, Jay D. (2006). "Intelligent Design and the First Amendment: A Response". Washington University Law Quarterly. 84 (1): 63.
- Wexler, Jay D. (Fall 2006). "Kitzmiller and the 'Is it Science?' Question" (PDF). First Amendment Law Review. 5 (1): 90.
- Wexler, Jay D. (2006). "Too Much, Too Little: Religion in the Public Schools". University of Maryland Law Journal of Race, Religion, Gender & Class. 6 (1): 107.
- Wexler, Jay D. (2003). "Darwin, Design, and Disestablishment: Teaching the Evolution Controversy in Public Schools" (PDF). Vanderbilt Law Review. 56 (3): 751.
- Wexler, Jay D. (March 2002). "Preparing for the Clothed Public Square: Teaching About Religion, Civic Education, and the Constitution". William and Mary Law Review. 43 (3): 1159.
- Wexler, Jay D. (January 1997). "Of Pandas, People, and the First Amendment: The Constitutionality of Teaching Intelligent Design in the Public Schools". Stanford Law Review. 49 (2): 439–470. doi:10.2307/1229302. JSTOR 1229302.
- Wilkins, Adam S. (2006). ""Intelligent design" as both problem and symptom". BioEssays. 28 (4): 327–329. doi:10.1002/bies.20400. PMID 16547955.
- Wilkins, John S; Elsberry, Wesley R. (2001). "The advantages of theft over toil: the design inference and arguing from ignorance". Biology and Philosophy. 16 (5): 711–724. doi:10.1023/A:1012282323054. S2CID 170765232.

==== Critical non-fiction films ====
- Flock of Dodos A biting, tongue-in-cheek documentary that pans both sides of the debate.
- Judgement Day: Intelligent Design on Trial, a Public Broadcasting Service NOVA television documentary about the Kitzmiller v. Dover federal trial
- A War on Science is a 49-minute BBC Horizon television documentary about intelligent design, including the 2005 Kitzmiller v. Dover court battle. It prominently features Oxford University professor, biologist Richard Dawkins. It was first broadcast on 26 January 2006. Intelligent design supporters and promoters Phillip Johnson, Michael Behe, Stephen C. Meyer and William A. Dembski also appear in the documentary.

== Fiction ==
The concept of life having been designed or manipulated is a staple of science fiction. Aspects of Intelligent Design are explored in:

- Calculating God by Robert J. Sawyer. 2000. ISBN 0-312-86713-1 A science fiction novel in which an intelligent designer is manipulating reality solely for the benefit of human-kind and three other sentient species residing in our galaxy.
- 2001: A Space Odyssey; in the movie, human evolution is accelerated and guided by an unspecified force, assumed by many to be aliens. In the novel based on the film, human evolution is accelerated and guided by aliens.
- In the Doctor Who episode Image of the Fendahl, evolution on Earth was guided by an alien, to allow it to feed on humans.
- The novel Frankenstein, or the Modern Prometheus prominently features an intelligently (but imperfectly) designed creature, whose faults stem from the inherent flaws of its creator, Victor Frankenstein.
- The Hitchhiker's Guide to the Galaxy reveals that the Earth was built by the Magratheans who were commissioned by mice and designed by the computer Deep Thought to find the ultimate question of life, the universe, and everything.
- In the movie Mission to Mars, highly evolved aliens accelerated and guided human evolution.
- Rama Revealed by Arthur C. Clarke and Gentry Lee; in this final novel of a series, it is revealed that the (mostly offstage) Ramans create universes and test their inhabitants in an attempt to maximise the quantity of consciousness within them.
- According to the Star Trek: The Next Generation episode "The Chase", Star Trek aliens all look similar because life was seeded on different planets by highly evolved aliens.
- In the Well World series, by Jack L. Chalker, aliens known as Markovians evolved and grew to the point where their computers, by means of a universal mathematics, were able to create/produce/do anything they wanted. Bored with being virtual gods, they decided their race had been flawed in some manner. So they designed a new universe and Markovian volunteers chose to become all of the new races therein, including humans, to see if perhaps another race could attain the perfection they believed existed but which they themselves failed to achieve.
- Roddy M. Bullock (2006). The Cave Painting: A Parable of Science. Access Research Network. ISBN 978-1-931796-27-9. Archived from the original on 2006-10-13.
- Dean Koontz (2009). Breathless. New York: Bantam Publishing. ISBN 978-0-553-80715-8. References the mathematical calculation of the improbability of life.
- "Surface Tension" is a 1952 science fiction short story by James Blish. A human colonization ship crash-lands and they genetically engineer their descendants into something that can survive. They create a race of microscopic aquatic humanoids and metal plates of knowledge for them. Blish coined the term pantropy to refer to this concept, as opposed to terraforming.
- "Microcosmic God" is a 1941 science fiction novelette by Theodore Sturgeon. A scientist develops a synthetic life form, which he calls "Neoterics", that live at a greatly accelerated rate and produce many generations over a short time so he can use their inventions. The scientist asserts his authority by killing half the population whenever they disobey his "divine" orders.
- Prometheus is a 2012 science fiction film that follows the journey of the Earth spaceship Prometheus as it follows an ancient star map which takes them to humanity's creators or "Engineers".

== See also ==
- List of creation myths
- List of god video games
- Artificial life: Notable simulators
- Life simulation game
- Shaggy God story
