= Darwinism, Design and Public Education =

2003 book edited by John Angus Campbell and Stephen C. Meyer

- Cover
- Editors: John Angus Campbell; Stephen C. Meyer
- Language: English
- Series: Rhetoric & Public Affairs
- Subject: Intelligent design
- Publisher: Michigan State University Press
- Publication date: December 2003
- Publication place: United States
- Media type: Print (Hardcover)
- Pages: 544
- ISBN: 0-87013-670-4
- OCLC: 53145654
- Dewey Decimal: 576.8/071 22
- LC Class: QH362 .D37 2003

Darwinism, Design and Public Education is a 2003 anthology, consisting largely of rewritten versions of essays from a 1998 issue of Michigan State University Press's journal, Rhetoric and Public Affairs, edited by intelligent design activists John Angus Campbell (who serves on the journal's editorial board) and Stephen C. Meyer. The book was promoted as being a "peer-reviewed science book". It is written by advocates of intelligent design, and consists of pro-evolution essays.

The book purports to address the question of "[s]hould public school science teachers be free to teach the controversies over biological origins" and promotes the Discovery Institute's "teach the controversy" political action plan, whilst claiming "not to advocate the theory of ID." This denial is later undercut by claiming that an understanding of ID is needed "to understand Darwin's argument, to say nothing of the contemporary controversy that it continues to generate".

== Representation of intelligent design ==
In his introduction, Campbell states:

Only evolution in the classroom, insist Darwin's defenders.

No evolution in the classroom, cry creationists.
The debate over how best to teach evolution has devolved into an either-or argument that threatens science education in our schools. Both views reflect poor science, and if either side wins, students will lose.
As science, ID is an argument against the orthodox Darwinian claim that mindless forces—such as variation, inheritance, natural selection, and time—can account for the principal features of the biological world.
As a philosophy, ID is a critique of the prevailing philosophy of science that limits explanation to purely physical or material causes.

As a program for educational reform, ID is a public movement to make Darwinism—its evidence, philosophic presuppositions, and rhetorical tactics—a matter of informed, broad, and spirited public discussion.

Forrest rebuts these three assertions by pointing out that:

Science, however, does not consist of "arguments against" anything. People who claim to have a scientific theory must actually do scientific work and produce original, empirical data; but at an October 2002 ID conference, CSC fellow William Dembski, ID's leading intellectual, admitted that while ID has made cultural inroads, it enjoys no scientific success. And in criticizing science's limitation to material, i.e., natural, explanations, Campbell reveals ID to be not a philosophy, but a religious belief that would explain natural phenomena by invoking the only alternative: the supernatural. Campbell, of course, cannot use that term without divulging ID's religious identity, which is the chief obstacle to the Wedge's plans for educational "reform." But the public discussion of "Darwinism" that Campbell seeks to advance toward such reform is nothing more than the usual creationist carping against evolution.

== Peer review ==
The Discovery Institute lists five chapters as "Peer-Reviewed & Peer-Edited Scientific Publications Supporting the Theory of Intelligent Design, although Mark Isaak of the talk.origins Archive notes that "Anthologies and conference proceedings do not have well-defined peer review standards" and that "reviewers are themselves ardent supporters of intelligent design. The purpose of peer review is to expose errors, weaknesses, and significant omissions in fact and argument. That purpose is not served if the reviewers are uncritical". The five papers are:

- DNA and the origin of life, Information, specification and explanation Stephen C. Meyer
- Design in the details: The origin of biomolecular machines, Michael Behe
- Reinstating design within science, William Dembski
- Homology in biology: Problem for naturalistic science and prospect for intelligent design Paul Nelson (creationist) and Jonathan Wells
- The Cambrian explosion: biology’s big bang, Stephen C. Meyer, Marcus Ross, Paul Nelson, and Paul Chien

The first three are actually listed twice including once as "featured articles". Meyer's paper on the Cambrian explosion also contains much of the same material which went into another of the claimed peer-reviewed papers which was at the center of the Sternberg peer review controversy.

== See also ==
- List of works on intelligent design
