= John Angus Campbell =

American professor

- Born: March 10, 1942 (age 84); Portland, Oregon, U.S.
- Education: Portland State University (BS); University of Pittsburgh (MA, PhD)

John Angus Campbell (born March 10, 1942) is an American former professor of communication and rhetoric at the University of Memphis who argues that the religious idea of intelligent design should be mentioned in schools when teaching Darwin's theory of evolution. He was a fellow of the Center for Science and Culture (CSC), the subsidiary promoting creationism of the Discovery Institute, a Seattle-based conservative think tank; he became a fellow of the Discovery Institute in 1995. He was a fellow in communications of the now-defunct International Society for Complexity, Information, and Design (ISCID), whose tagline was "retraining the scientific imagination to see purpose in nature".

== Personal life ==
On March 10, 1942, he was born in Portland, Oregon. He continued to be raised in the Pacific Northwest.

He was a member of the Cub Scouts and Boy Scouts in Oregon, receiving the Eagle Scout award and becoming a member of the Order of the Arrow. In 1960, he worked for the Forest Service, doing "minor surveying and major brush whacking". From 1960 to 1968, he did various door-to-door sales in Oregon and Northern California.

After high school, Campbell graduated from Portland State University with a Bachelor of Science in communications in 1964. He then pursued graduate studies at the University of Pittsburgh, where he worked as a teaching assistant and earned an M.A. in communications and a Ph.D. in communications in 1968.

In 1982, he married Brooke Quigley. In 1990, they bought property in North Mason; after he retired in 2005, he moved to Belfair.

From 2000 to 2005, he was a board member of the YMCA in Memphis, TN. In 2007, he was a member of the Citizens Committee for the Establishment of Mason County Hospital District 2 in Belfair, WA.

== Career ==
He taught communication in the Department of Speech at University of Washington, as an Assistant Professor from 1968 to 1973 or 1976, then as an Associate Professor until 1995, totaling 28 years, teaching students from freshman to doctoral; there, he received a Distinguished Teaching Award in 1993 and a Dean's Recognition Award in 1994, and advised/directed 14 completed Ph.D. dissertations. He was a Professor and Graduate Program Director / Director of Graduate Studies in the Department of Communication at University of Memphis for 10 years starting in 1995, retiring and becoming Professor Emeritus in 2005, teaching graduate Rhetorical Theory, undergraduate Oral Communication, undergraduate Rhetorical Perspectives in Intellectual Revolution, graduate Rhetoric of Science, undergraduate Great American Speeches, graduate Rhetorical Criticism, graduate Classical Rhetoric, undergraduate Senior Thesis, graduate Modern Rhetoric, Independent Studies (Rhetoric of Science), graduate Independent Studies, graduate Rhetoriography, and undergraduate and graduate American Public Address; there, he directed 7 completed Ph.D. dissertations, had 1 M.A. and 1 Ph.D. scholarships for Distinguished Teaching established in his name by his colleagues, and inaugurated a doctoral program which as of 2007 was ranked 13th in the US. As of 2007, he was directing 7 Ph.D. dissertations in progress, long-distance from his home office in Belfair. As of 2007, all of his 21 completed Ph.D. students were "successfully employed in their chosen fields of endeavor".

In 1970/1971 and 1987, he received the Golden Monograph Award for Distinguished Scholarship from the National Communication Association; the second time, it was called the Golden Anniversary. In 1990, he was a Van Zelst Visiting professor of communication at Northwestern University. He was declared Communication Educator of the Year in 2001 and Communicator of the Year in 2004 by the Tennessee State Communication Association. In 2003/2004, he received the Oleg Ziman Award for best essay/article from the Journal of Interdisciplinary Studies. In 2005, he received the James Madison Award in First Amendment Studies from the Freedom of Speech Division of the Southern States Communication Association.

He was invited to do a MacArthur Lecture at University of Utah in 1982 as part of their "In Darwin's Wake" series, a Van Zelst Lecture at Northwestern University in 1990, a Brigance Lecture at Wabash College in 1999, a lecture at St. John's College at University of British Columbia in 2000, a lecture for the departments of English and Philosophy at University of Waterloo in 2003, a lecture for the Honors College at University of Central Arkansas in 2003, a lecture for the department of Biology at University of Mississippi in 2004, a key note address at Denison University as part of the faculty conference "Is Pub Speaking A Liberal Art?" in 2004, a lecture at the McLauren Institute at University of Minnesota in 2004, a lecture at the department of Communication at Tulane University in 2005, a key note address at Kent State in 2006, and a lecture at Greene College at University of British Columbia in 2006.

As of 2007, he had published "more than 35 single-authored, peer-reviewed essays, not including book reviews and conference papers". In 1976, as part of the series Modules in speech communication published by Science Research Associates, he wrote a 47-page textbook titled An Overview of Speech Preparation. In 1996, he wrote an essay on teaching titled "Oratory, Democracy and the Classroom". In November 2003, together with Stephen C. Meyer (who is also a Fellow of the Center for Science and Culture) he edited Darwinism, Design and Public Education, a collection of articles primarily from a 1998 issue of the journal Rhetoric and Public Affairs published by Michigan State University Press, purporting a scientific basis for intelligent design.

In Fall 2000, he received $12,000 from the Discovery Institute.

He did High Ability Day for "Highschool Students interested in Communication" starting in 1995; did the Urban Communication Conference for "Community Activists, local government representatives, citizens and U of M students" starting in 1995; served as judge on March 18, 1998, and February 10, 1999, for the Optimist Club High School Oratory Contest; presented a lecture on "Rhetoric & The Art of Preaching" to the Harding Grad School of Religion, Prof David Bland Dr. of Ministry Seminar in 1997–1998; presented a lecture on "Classical Rhetoric & Prophetic Rhetoric: A Necessary Tension?" to the Mid-America Baptist Theological Seminary, sponsored by Prof Ken Easley, in 2000; attended and presented at Career Day to "department majors", sponsored by Professor McDowell, in 2002; met with Jim Carnes of the Classical School, a "private school centered on rhetoric and the classics" in 2002; presented a lecture to Memphis Classical School faculty and students on "The Centrality of Argument to a Liberal Education" on March 22, 2003; had a discussion with faculty members at Memphis Theological Seminary during a lunch meeting in January 2004; and was a board member of the Mason YMCA in 2004. In 2006, he presented two seminars, one in the summer, and one more in the fall after observing its success and interest, on "Civic Communication" at the Theler Center in Belfair, WA, in the North Mason community. As of 2007, he was in his second term as President of the Association for the Rhetoric of Science & Technology.

In 1995, he became an Associate Editor for the NCA's Quarterly Journal of Speech (with a hiatus between 1998 and 2000), and later Argumentation & Advocacy, Southern Journal of Communication, and Rhetoric and Public Affairs. From 2003 to 2004, he was Secretary American Branch Society for the History of Rhetoric at SSCA. Starting in 1997, he was Associate Editor of Origins & Design published by the Access Research Network. In 2000, he was Associate Editor for Poroi, published by the University of Iowa. In the summer of 1990, he was Guest Editor for a special issue on rhetorical criticism of the Western Journal of Speech Communication, published by U of Iowa. In 1998, he was Guest Editor for a special issue on Intelligent Design & Public Policy for Rhetoric and Public Affairs, published by U of Iowa. In 1994, he was on U of Iowa's Wichelns/Winans Award Committee. Starting in 1994, he was on U of Iowa's Woolbert Award Committee, being chair in 1996. Starting in 1999, he was on U of Iowa's Dissertation Award Committee. From 2002 to 2003, he was on U of Iowa's Gerald (R.) Miller Dissertation Award Committee. From 2002 to 2003, he was on U of Iowa's Marie Hochmuth Nichols Award Committee. In 2002, he represented U of Iowa at the NCA/NSF conference in Leesburgh, Virginia. From 1997 to 1998, he was President of the American Association for the Rhetoric of Science & Technology. From 1997 to 1999, he was chair of the Rhetoric & Public Address Division of the Tennessee State Communication Association. From 1995 to 1996, he was chair of the Committee on Program Viability for the Southern States Communication Association. He participated in the Tenure/Promotion Assessments for Dr. Marouf Hasian at Arizona State University in 1997, Dr. Jeff[rey S.] Philpott at Seattle University in 1998, and Dr. William Purcell at Seattle Pacific University in 1998. He participated in the Grant Application Evaluation for Dr. Judy Segal at University of British Columbia in 1998. He participated in the Tenure/Promotion Assessments for Dr. Eric Gander at Baruch College in the City University of New York and Dr. Ken Zagacki at University of North Carolina in 2002. From 2003 to 2004, he was Secretary American Branch International Society for the History of Rhetoric of the Southern States Communication Association. From 2005 to 2006, he was Second Vice President, in charge of program planning, at the American Association for the Rhetoric of Science and Technology.

In 2007, he ran for a seat on the school board of North Mason School District (#403) in the state of Washington, stating that "issues of communication" were the cause of many stakeholders' frustrations, that he "will work to establish transparency in board deliberations and to foster the consensus-building vital to wise policy, public credibility, and excellence in education", and that his candidacy was about "creating a positive atmosphere in which our students will achieve their full potential". His campaign page summarized that he will "help restore TRUST and a spirit of collaboration among those concerned about local education", "use his LEADERSHIP skills to work to build consensus, vital to excellence in education", and "create open and clear COMMUNICATION between the school board, teachers, administrators and the community." However, he did not disclose his connections to intelligent design; in a telephone interview he stated that he would not be dealing with curricula, and that he is a "Darwinist" who considers that debating Darwin can engage the interest of students and improve their skills in critical thinking. He was quoted as saying "Rather than demonizing people that believe in ID, I think there are ways people could use their ideas to study Darwinism more closely." He said that he "doorbelled about a thousand homes and apartments and talked to an equal number of people in the parking lots of Safeway and QFC. People are really concerned about the reputation and image of the schools." The election was held on November 6, 2007, and results showed him defeating the incumbent Glenn Landram by 2,216 votes to 992; he said that he was "really grateful to the people of this community for the trust and confidence they have placed in" him. At a special meeting on December 14, 2023, he retired from his position as District 4 Director of the North Mason School Board; the board unanimously voted to replace him with Nicholas Thomas.

=== Involvement in the trial Kitzmiller v. Dover Area School District ===
The Thomas More Law Center (TMLC) named him, among others, as an expert witness for the defense in the case of Kitzmiller v. Dover Area School District. In early 2005, Susan Spath, Public Information Director at the National Center for Science Education, aided by activists contributing to a Wiki page, spent most of two months analyzing his expert report and his writings, in order to help the plaintiff criticize and question him during his deposition, which was scheduled to occur on June 2, 2005. At 9 AM on June 2, 2005, Pepper Hamilton attorney Thomas Schmidt III and legal assistant Kate Henslow, representing the plaintiffs, were waiting in Memphis, Tennessee, to take his deposition, with the help of a court reporter they hired. Campbell, TMLC attorney Pat Gillen, and a lawyer from the Discovery Institute arrived, and Gillen announced that Campbell was withdrawn from the case, so the deposition was cancelled. Campbell was the first, but other expert witnesses also subsequently withdrew from the case.

Campbell, as well as Stephen Meyer and William Dembski, all fellows of the Discovery Institute (DI), were willing to testify as expert witnesses under the condition that they have their own independent legal counsel with them during their depositions, but Richard Thompson, lead attorney for TMLC, refused to allow their request, citing a conflict of interest, but without providing legal justification for this. This disagreement resulted in the cancellation of their depositions. This resulted in an amplification of conflict between the TMLC and the DI.

The withdrawal of the expert witnesses hurt the defense's ability to support their side.

Campbell's opinions are stated in his expert report.
