= Breathless =

Breathless may refer to:

== Aircraft ==
- Paradelta Breathless, an Italian paraglider design

== Film and television ==
- Breathless (1960 film) (À bout de souffle), a French film directed by Jean-Luc Godard
- Breathless (1982 film), a Dutch film
- Breathless (1983 film), a remake of the 1960 film, starring Richard Gere
- Breathless (2008 film), a South Korean film directed by and starring Yang Ik-june
- Breathless (2012 film), an American film starring Gina Gershon
- Breathless (British TV series), a 2013 period drama series
- Breathless (Spanish TV series), a 2024 hospital drama series
- "Breathless" (CSI: Miami), a 2002 episode

== Music ==
- Breathless (band), an English band
- Breathless, an American rock band led by Jonah Koslen

=== Albums ===
- Breathless (Camel album) or the title song, 1978
- Breathless (The Eyes of a Traitor album) or the title song, 2010
- Breathless (Kenny G album), 1992
- Breathless (Shankar Mahadevan album) or the title song, 1998
- Breathless (Shayne Ward album) or the title song (see below), 2007
- Breathless (Terence Blanchard album) or the title song, 2015
- Breathless, an EP by the Dan Reed Network, 1986

=== Songs ===
- "Breathless" (Corinne Bailey Rae song), 2007
- "Breathless" (The Corrs song), 2000
- "Breathless" (Jerry Lee Lewis song), 1958
- "Breathless" (Shayne Ward song), 2007
- "Calling" / "Breathless", by Arashi, 2013
- "Breathless", by Asking Alexandria from Reckless & Relentless, 2011
- "Breathless", by Better Than Ezra from Before the Robots, 2005
- "Breathless", by Cascada from Evacuate the Dancefloor, 2009
- "Breathless", by Dan Wilson from Free Life, 2007
- "Breathless", by Dio from The Last in Line, 1984
- "Breathless", by Figures on a Beach, 1984
- "Breathless", by The Ghost Inside from Searching for Solace, 2024
- "Breathless", by Nick Cave and the Bad Seeds from Abattoir Blues / The Lyre of Orpheus, 2004
- "Breathless", by Quiet Riot from Metal Health, 1983
- "Breathless", by SPK from Digitalis Ambigua: Gold & Poison, 1987
- "Breathless", by Todd Rundgren from Something/Anything?, 1972
- "Breathless", by Viktor Lazlo from Viktor Lazlo, 1987
- "Breathless", by Waxahatchee from Ivy Tripp, 2015

== Literature and fiction ==
- Breathless (novel), a 2009 novel by Dean Koontz
- Breathless (McDaniel novel), a 2009 young-adult novel by Lurlene McDaniel
- Breathless, a 1996 erotica short story collection by Kitty Tsui
- Breathless: The Scientific Race to Defeat a Deadly Virus, a 2022 book by David Quammen
- Breathless Mahoney, a fictional character in the comic strip Dick Tracy and related media

== Video games ==
- Breathless (video game)

== See also ==
- I'm Breathless, an album by Madonna
- Breathing, the process of taking oxygen in and carbon dioxide out of the body
- Dyspnea, shortness of breath, or breathlessness
