= Richard Milton =

Richard Milton may refer to:

- Richard Milton (author), wrote The Facts of Life: Shattering the Myths of Darwinism
- Richard Milton (swimmer) (born 1965), Swedish swimmer
