= Weed Rules =

2023 book by Jay Wexler

Weed Rules: Blazing the Way to a Just and Joyful Marijuana Policy
- Book cover
- Author: Jay Wexler
- Published: 2023
- Publisher: University of California Press
- ISBN: 0520343921
- OCLC: 1348334523

Weed Rules: Blazing the Way to a Just and Joyful Marijuana Policy is a 2023 book by Jay Wexler, published by University of California Press.

The book argues that states which have legalized cannabis should adopt a "careful exuberance" approach to regulating the drug rather than the "grudging tolerance" they typically use now. Wexler suggests that a commitment to equity and joy should guide cannabis policy. One of the critiques outlined by the book of the "grudging tolerance" status quo as of its publication, is restrictions on cannabis advertising.

== Reception ==
A review in the journal The Social History of Alcohol and Drugs found the book to be an "interesting and engaging" introduction to cannabis policy reform.
