= Is Genesis History? =

2017 creationist documentary film

- Theatrical release poster
- Directed by: Thomas Purifoy Jr.
- Written by: Thomas Purifoy Jr.
- Produced by: Thomas Purifoy Jr.
- Starring: George Grant; Paul Nelson; Marcus R. Ross; Andrew A. Snelling; Kurt Wise
- Distributed by: Fathom Events
- Release date: February 23, 2017
- Running time: 100 minutes
- Country: United States
- Box office: $2.6 million

Is Genesis History? is a 2017 American Christian film by Thomas Purifoy Jr. that promotes the pseudoscientific notion of Young Earth creationism, a form of creation science built on beliefs that contradict established scientific facts regarding the origin of the Universe, the age of the Earth and the universe, the origin of the Solar System, and the origin and evolution of life. The film suggests the Earth was created in six days of 24-hours each in opposition to day-age creationism, and also advocates the biblical narratives of Adam and Eve, the Fall, the global flood, and the tower of Babel from the Book of Genesis. The film grossed $2.6 million in theaters and $3.3 million in video sales.

== Production ==
The film was written, directed, and produced by Thomas Purifoy Jr., who said he was inspired to make it after his daughter watched the Bill Nye–Ken Ham debate in 2014 and began asking him questions about the creation–evolution controversy. Del Tackett, the creator of Focus on the Family's "The Truth Project", narrates the film. Interviewing thirteen creationists, the narrator of the film argues that Genesis portrays real historical events. Other speakers include creationists George Grant, Paul Nelson, Marcus R. Ross, Andrew A. Snelling, and Kurt Wise, and also Larry Vardiman in the film's bonus features.

== Release history ==
Is Genesis History? was released into American theaters on Thursday, February 23, 2017. It was shown in 704 theaters and grossed $1.8 million in one night. Over 143,000 people saw the film that night, and its box office earnings were the highest of any film in theaters in the United States that night. The film was shown again in theaters on March 2 and 7, 2017, in the United States, and also in Canada on March 14, 2017. The film went on to earn a total box office of $2.6 million, after the encore showings. The film was re-released in around 850 theaters for an anniversary showing on February 22, 2018, with a bonus scene of Wheaton College students touring the Ark Encounter, a creationist attraction operated by Answers in Genesis, a fundamentalist apologetics organization. The students were members of a creationist club which had requested a screening of the film, leading to controversy among the Christian school's faculty, nearly all of whom reject the "historical creationism" narrative that Is Genesis History? presents.

The film has since been released on streaming platforms including Amazon, Youtube, Tubi, Roku, ITunes and Google Play

A follow-up film, Mountains after the Flood, was released in 2023.

== See also ==
- Biblical cosmology
- Flood geology
- Genesis creation narrative
- Expelled: No Intelligence Allowed
