= Andrew A. Snelling =

Australian young-Earth creationist

Andrew A. Snelling is a young-Earth creationist geologist who works for Answers in Genesis.

== Education and career ==
Snelling has a Ph.D. in geology from the University of Sydney from 1982.

He was, for a decade, the geology spokesman for the Creation Science Foundation, the coordinating center for creationism in Australia. He started working for Answers in Genesis in 2007 and serves as AiG's director of research.

Snelling has been published in standard geological publications estimating the age of geological specimens in billions of years, but has also written articles for creationist journals in which he supports a young-earth creationism viewpoint. He worked in the RATE project.

Snelling appeared in the 2017 creationist documentary film Is Genesis History?

== Discrimination allegation lawsuit ==
Snelling, like other young-Earth creationists, believes the Grand Canyon formed as a result of the Biblical flood; In 2013 Snelling applied for a permit to collect 50-60 half-pound rocks from the park. The application was denied because the National Park Service screens applications to take material from the Grand Canyon, to protect it. One of the three geologists who reviewed the proposal for the National Park Service stated that the type of rock Snelling was trying to test could be found outside the park, and all three reviewers made it clear they did not consider the proposal scientifically valid.

Snelling submitted a revised proposal in 2016. In a letter dated May 5, 2017, the NPS said it found the application acceptable and it was willing to grant it if changes were made to locations and methods of collecting rocks; Snelling proposed to chisel away rocks and to do so from highly visible rock faces, to take samples from land that was not parkland but rather was on an Indian reservation and also from another location that was likely to have archeological remains. The NPS had authorized a river trip for Snelling to survey locations but not to collect specimens; Snelling objected that this would take too much time and expense, and in response in the May 5 letter, the NPS offered to have staff work with Snelling to map locations in a meeting or conference call.

On May 9, 2017, Snelling, with the help of the Alliance Defending Freedom, filed a religious discrimination lawsuit against the United States Department of the Interior and the Grand Canyon National Park authorities, citing the Trump administration's executive order of May 4, 2017 about religious liberty. In late June 2017 Answers in Genesis released a statement saying the National Park authorities had issued Snelling a permit to collect rock samples, and that Snelling had withdrawn the lawsuit. Snelling's attorneys did not provide a copy of the permit to a reporter from the Phoenix New Times who requested it.

== Publications ==
=== Books ===
- Snelling, Andrew A (2009). Earth's Catastrophic Past: Geology, Creation, & the Flood. Vol. 2. Master Books. p. 1126. ISBN 978-0-89051-873-1.
- Boyd, Steven; Snelling, Andrew A (2014). Grappling with the Chronology of the Genesis Flood. Master Books. p. 828. ISBN 978-0890517093.
- Snelling, Andrew A (2022). The Genesis Flood Revisited. Master Books. p. 672. ISBN 978-1683443230.

=== In creationist journals ===
- Snelling, Andrew A; Mackay, John (1984). "Coal, Volcanism And Noah's Flood". Ex Nihilo Tech. J. 1: 11–29.
- Snelling, A.A.; MacKay, J.B. (1985). "Evidence for catastrophic deposition of coal seams and sediments of the Newcastle Coal Measures". In Moelle, Konrad H.R. (ed.). Advances in the study of the Sydney Basin. Vol. 19. Proceedings of the Symposium. pp. 110–112.
- Snelling, Andrew A (1986). "Coal Beds And Noah's Flood". Creation Ex Nihilo. 8 (3): 20–21.
- Snelling, Andrew A (1988). "Is the sun shrinking? Part 1. The evidence unfolds". Creation Ex Nihilo. 11 (1): 14–19.
- Snelling, Andrew A (1989). "Is the sun shrinking? Part 2. The debate continues". Creation Ex Nihilo. 11 (2): 30–34.
- Snelling, Andrew A (1989). "Is the sun shrinking? Part 3. An unresolved question?". Creation Ex Nihilo. 11 (3): 40–43.
- Snelling, Andrew A.; Rush, David E. (1993). "Moon Dust and the Age of the Solar System". Creation Ex-Nihilo Technical Journal. 7: 2–42.

=== In scientific Journals ===
- Giblin, A.M.; Snelling, A.A. (1983). "Application of hydrogeochemistry to uranium exploration in the Pine Creek Geosyncline, Northern Territory, Australia". In Parslow, G.R. (ed.). Geochemical exploration 1982. Vol. 19. Journal of Geochemical Exploration. pp. 33–55.
- Snelling, A.A. (1984). "A soil geochemistry orientation survey for uranium at Koongarra, Northern Territory". In Davy, R.; Mazzucchelli, R.H. (eds.). Geochemical exploration in arid and deeply weathered terrains. Vol. 22. Journal of Geochemical Exploration. pp. 83–99.
- Dickson, B.L.; Gulson, B.L.; Snelling, A.A. (1985). "Evaluation of lead isotopic methods for uranium exploration, Koongarra area, Northern Territory, Australia". Journal of Geochemical Exploration. 24 (1): 81–102. doi:10.1016/0375-6742(85)90005-6.
- Gole, M.J.; Butt, C.R.M.; Snelling, A.A. (1986). "A groundwater helium survey of the Koongarra uranium deposits, Pine Creek Geosyncline, Northern Territory;". Uranium. 2 (4): 343–360.
- Dickson, B.L.; Giblin, A.M.; Snelling, A.A. (1987). "The source of radium in anomalous accumulations near sandstone escarpments, Australia". Applied Geochemistry. 2 (4): 385–398. Bibcode:1987ApGC....2..385D. doi:10.1016/0883-2927(87)90023-0.
- Dickson, B.L.; Gulson, B.L.; Snelling, A.A. (1987). "Further assessment of stable lead isotope measurements for uranium exploration, Pine Creek Geosyncline, Northern Territory, Australia". Journal of Geochemical Exploration. 27 (1–2): 63–75. doi:10.1016/0375-6742(87)90005-7.
- Snelling, A.A. (1990). Hughes, F.E. (ed.). "Koongarra uranium deposits". Geology of the Mineral Deposits of Australia and Papua New Guinea. 14: 807–812.
