= Marcus R. Ross =

American paleontologist

- Born: 1976 (age 49–50)
- Education: Pennsylvania State University (BS); South Dakota School of Mines and Technology (MS); University of Rhode Island (PhD)
- Scientific career
- Fields: Geosciences
- Workplaces: Liberty University; Discovery Institute

Marcus R. Ross (born 1976) is an American young Earth creationist and vertebrate paleontologist. Ross was featured in a February 2007 New York Times article about the conflict between his young Earth creationist beliefs (which hold the Earth to be only thousands of years old) and his doctoral dissertation (which involved animals extinct for millions of years). His dissertation was on tracking the diversity, biostratigraphy, and extinction of mosasaurs, an extinct group of marine reptiles whose remains are found in Late Cretaceous period (100–66 Ma) deposits around the world.

== Biography ==
Ross received his B.S. in Earth science from Pennsylvania State University, his M.S. in paleontology from the South Dakota School of Mines and Technology and his Ph.D. in geosciences from the University of Rhode Island, as a student of paleontologist David Fastovsky He is an Assistant Professor of Geology in the Biology/Chemistry Department at Liberty University, where he is also the Assistant Director of the Center for Creation Studies.

As a graduate student, Ross was a fellow of the Discovery Institute's Center for Science and Culture. Ross, along with Fred Heeren (an old Earth creationist), attended the Kunming conference in China with grants from the Institute. The conference was notable for being secretly funded by the Discovery Institute in a failed attempt to gain scientific legitimacy for intelligent design.

In 2007, Ross was featured in a report on creationism. Ross "believes that the Bible is a literally true account of the creation of the universe and that the earth is at most 10,000 years old." This is in contrast to his previous position as reflected when he earned his Ph.D. in geosciences from University of Rhode Island with a dissertation about "the abundance and spread of mosasaurs, marine reptiles that, as he wrote, vanished at the end of the Cretaceous era about 65 million years ago." Ross has been criticized by some for taking this academic route, but Ross claims that it only firmed his belief in young Earth creationism and has enabled him to find academic ground upon which to base the argument for his scientific credentials.

In 2011, Steven Newton's cover story in Earth discussed Ross using minor appearances at academic conferences, where he uses standard science, as a way to bolster claims that creationists challenge mainstream geological consensus when they are not presenting young Earth creationism at the conferences. Newton wrote, that Ross said that "he thought in a 'framework' of standard science; but for a creationist audience, he said, he used a creationist framework.

Ross appeared in the 2017 creationist documentary film Is Genesis History?.

== Media ==
He has also been interviewed by Christian radio stations, and was featured in DVD lectures arguing why he believes intelligent design is a better explanation than evolution for the Cambrian explosion, a 70 million to 80 million year diversification of invertebrate animal life about 530 MYA.

== Selected bibliography ==
- Ross, Marcus R., Stephen C. Meyer, Paul Nelson, and Paul Chien. 2004. "The Cambrian Explosion: Biology's Big Bang". In Darwinism, Design and Public Education (Michigan State University Press), pp. 323–402. ISBN 0-87013-675-5
- Ross, Marcus R. (2005), "Who Believes What? Clearing up Confusion over Intelligent Design and Young-Earth Creationism", Journal of Geoscience Education, 53 (3): 319–323, Bibcode:2005JGeEd..53..319R, doi:10.5408/1089-9995-53.3.319, S2CID 14208021
- Ross, Marcus R., and David Fastovsky, "Resolving Mosasaur (Diapsida, Squamata) Extinction Across The Atlantic", Paper No. 165-7, at the 2006 Philadelphia Annual Meeting of the Geological Society of America (22–25 October 2006).
- Ross, Marcus R., and Roger J. Cuffey, "Chondrichthyan And Reptilian Fossils From The Upper Cretaceous Peedee Formation At Elizabethtown, Southeastern North Carolina, And Comparison To New Jersey Faunas", Paper No. 24-2, at the Geological Society of America Joint Annual Meeting (March 12–14, 2003).

== See also ==
- Flood geology
- Age of the Earth
