= North Mason High School =

Location
- 150 E North Mason School Road; Belfair, Washington; United States; 47.4154°N 122.8400°W

Information
- Type: High school
- Established: 1982 (old), 2015 (new)
- School district: North Mason School District
- Principal: Chad Collins
- Teaching staff: 34.47 (FTE)
- Grades: 9–12
- Enrollment: 735 (2024–2025)
- Student to teacher ratio: 21.32
- Colors: Blue, White, Silver
- Mascot: Bulldog
- Yearbook: Siskan
- Website: www.northmasonschools.org/o/nmhs

North Mason High School is a public high school located in Belfair, Washington. It was constructed in 1982-1983 as part of North Mason School District and was replaced in fall of 2015 as a 95,000 square foot building for grades 9-12. It is one of two high school in the district.

== History ==
North Mason High School was first constructed in 1982–1983 to house 340 students. By 2015, the school population was between 650 and 700 students, but school construction bonds failed to pass in 2002, 2006, and 2008. A new 120,000 square foot building at the cost of $30 million was finished in 2015 to house the students at double the size of the old school.

== Athletics ==
North Mason High School offers various athletic programs including: Boys Cross Country, Girls Cross Country, Football, Cheer, Girls Soccer, Boys Tennis, Girls Volleyball, Boys Basketball, Girls Basketball, Girls Bowling, Boys/Girls Wrestling, Boys Baseball, Girls Fastpitch, Boys/Girls Golf, Boys Soccer, Girls Softball, Girls Tennis, and Boys/Girls Track.

== Demographics ==
In the 2024-2025 school year, 56.1% of the students at NMHS were male and 43.9% were female. 1.5% were Native American, 1.8% were Asian, 0.8% were Native Hawaiian/Other Pacific Islander, 29.6% were Hispanic/Latino, 0.8% were Black, 59.2% were White, and 6.4% were Two or More Races.

== Notable alumni ==
- CJ Allen, professional hurdler
