= Eugenie Scott =

American anthropologist

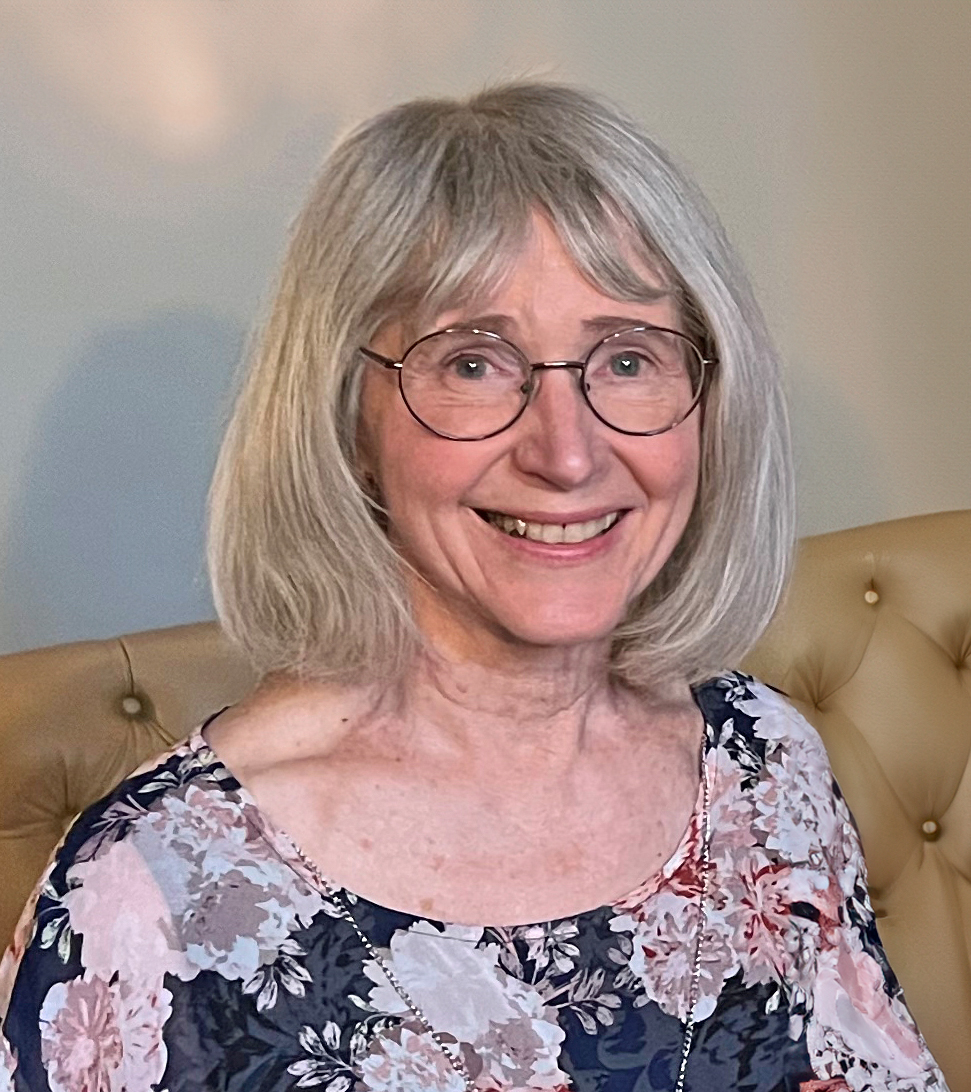
- Scott in 2022
- Born: October 24, 1945 (age 80); La Crosse, Wisconsin, U.S.
- Education: University of Wisconsin–Milwaukee (BS, MS); University of Missouri (PhD)
- Occupation: National Center for Science Education Advisor
- Awards: Public Welfare Medal (2010); Richard Dawkins Award (2012)
- Voice of Eugenie Scott

Eugenie Carol Scott (born October 24, 1945) is an American physical anthropologist who has been active in opposing the teaching of young Earth creationism and intelligent design in schools. She coined the term "Gish gallop" to describe a fallacious rhetorical technique of overwhelming an interlocutor with as many individually weak arguments as possible, in order to prevent rebuttal of the whole argument.

From 1986 to 2014, Scott served as the executive director of the National Center for Science Education, a nonprofit science education organization supporting teaching of evolutionary science. Since 2013, Scott has been listed on their advisory council.

Scott serves on the Board of Trustees of Americans United for Separation of Church and State. Scott is a member of the Board of Advisers for the publication, Scientific American. She is also a Fellow of the Committee for Skeptical Inquiry (CSI) and GWUP.

== Early life and education ==
Scott was born in 1945 in La Crosse, Wisconsin. She grew up in Wisconsin and first became interested in anthropology after reading her sister's anthropology textbook. She was raised in Christian Science but later joined a Congregational church.

Scott received a B.S. in 1967 and an M.S. in 1968 from the University of Wisconsin–Milwaukee. She was an instructor in anthropology at California State College at Hayward from 1968 to 1970, then received a Ph.D. in anthropology from the University of Missouri in 1974. She developed an interest in creationism in 1971 while a graduate student, and became fascinated with creation science literature. Her thesis at Missouri was titled, "Dental Evolution in Pre-Columbian Coastal Peru".

== Career ==
=== Academic ===
Scott's research work focused on medical anthropology, and skeletal biology. In 1970, Scott became an associate professor of anthropology at Sonoma State College. She then left the college and worked as a teaching assistant in anthropology at the University of Missouri from 1971 to 1974.

In 1974, Scott joined the faculty of the University of Kentucky as an assistant professor of anthropology. That same year, she attended a debate between her doctoral advisor, James Gavan, and biochemist creationist Duane Gish which piqued her interest in the creation–evolution controversy. She recalled that, after the debate, "we were greatly dismayed [...] The scientist talked science, and the creationist connected to the audience and told good jokes and was really personable. And presented a lot of really bad science". The event made her realize that creationism was "a movement that could have really serious consequences for science and science education".

=== NCSE ===
In 1980, Scott worked to prevent creationism from being taught in the public schools of Lexington, Kentucky. Scott was appointed the executive director of the National Center for Science Education in 1987, the year in which requiring the teaching of creation science in American public schools was deemed illegal by the Supreme Court in Edwards v. Aguillard. Scott announced that she would be retiring from this position by the end of 2013, doing so on 6 January 2014. Her place was taken by Ann Reid.

=== Worldview ===
Scott is a secular humanist and describes herself as a nontheist. In 2003, the San Francisco Chronicle reported that, "Scott describes herself as atheist but does not discount the importance of spirituality." In 2003, she was one of the signatories to the third humanist manifesto, Humanism and Its Aspirations.

=== Authorship ===
Scott is an expert on creationism and intelligent design. Her book Evolution vs. Creationism: An Introduction was published by Greenwood Press in 2004 and then in paperback by the University of California Press in 2005. Niles Eldredge wrote the foreword in the first edition. A second edition of the book was published in 2008 and in paperback in 2009. The foreword to this edition was written by John E. Jones III, who was the presiding judge in the Kitzmiller v. Dover court case.

She co-edited with Glenn Branch the 2006 anthology Not in Our Classrooms: Why Intelligent Design is Wrong for Our Schools.

In 2006 Jon D. Miller, Scott and Shinji Okamoto had a brief article published in Science entitled "Public Acceptance of Evolution", an analysis of polling on the acceptance of evolution from the last 20 years in the United States and compared to other countries. Turkey had the lowest acceptance of evolution in the survey, with the United States having the next-lowest, though the authors saw a positive in the higher percentage of Americans who are unsure about evolution, and therefore "reachable" for evolution.

=== Media appearances ===
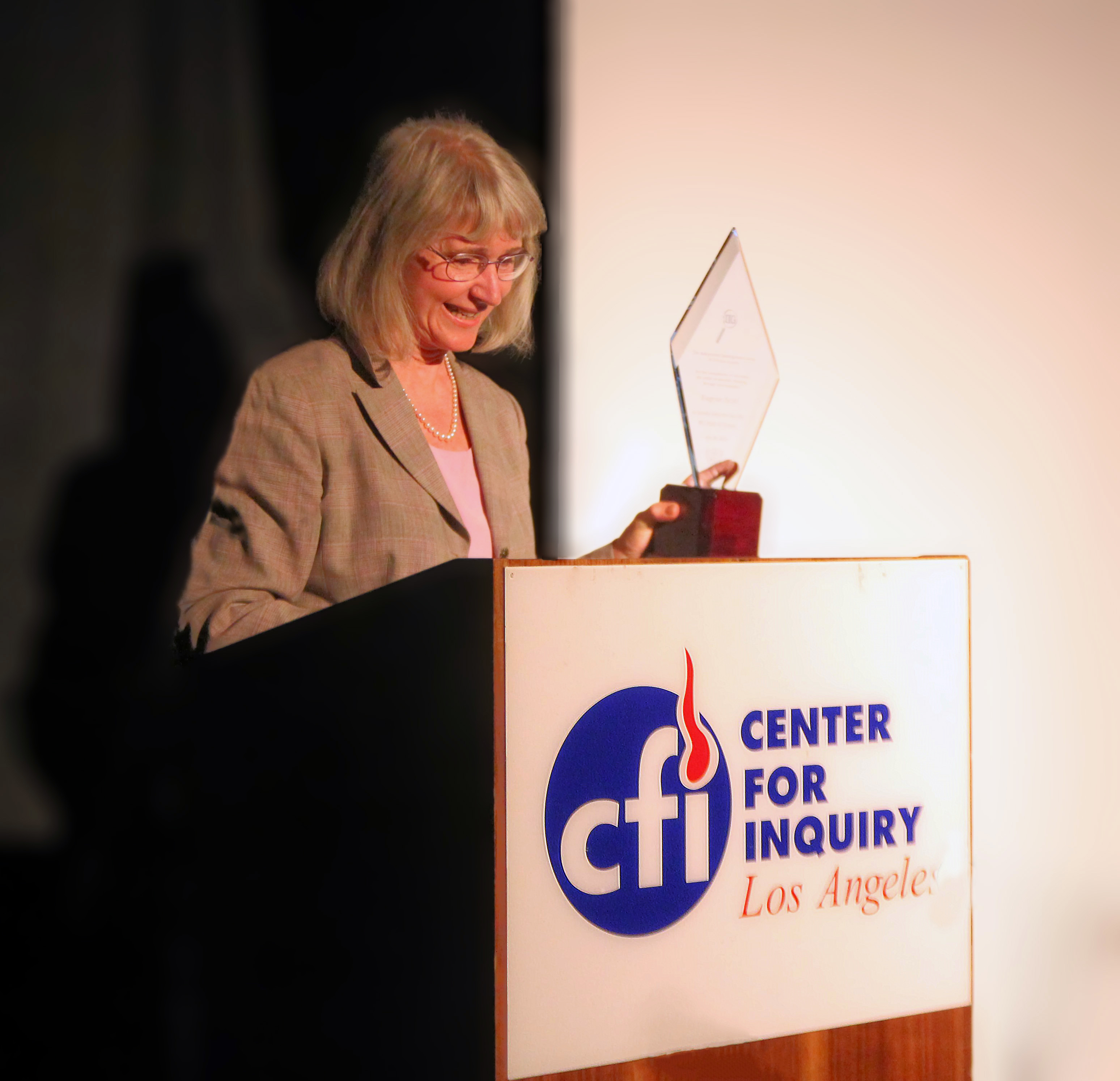
2009 Independent Investigations Award Recipient

Scott described herself as "Darwin's golden retriever".

Scott has been profiled in The New York Times, Scientific American, The Scientist, the San Francisco Chronicle, and the Stanford Medical Magazine. She has been interviewed for Science & Theology News, CSICOP, Church & State, and Point of Inquiry. Her commentary has been published by Science & Theology News, and Metanexus Institute.

Scott has taken part in numerous debates on MSNBC and Fox News.

In 2004, Scott represented the National Center for Science Education on the Showtime television show Penn & Teller: Bullshit!, on the episode titled "Creationism", where she offered philosophical views about the creationist and intelligent design movements.

=== Kitzmiller v. Dover Area School District ===
In 2005, Scott and other NCSE staff served as scientific and educational consultants for the plaintiffs in the Kitzmiller v. Dover Area School District case regarding the teaching of intelligent design in public schools. Judge John Jones ruled in favor of the plaintiffs. Scott said that "we won decisively" and "in triplicate", and "we had the better case." About the merits of the case, she said, "Within evolutionary biology, we argue about the details... and the mechanisms," but "we don't argue about whether living things descended with modification from common ancestors, which is what biological evolution is all about.... The Dover School Board wanted students to doubt whether evolution had taken place."

=== Awards ===
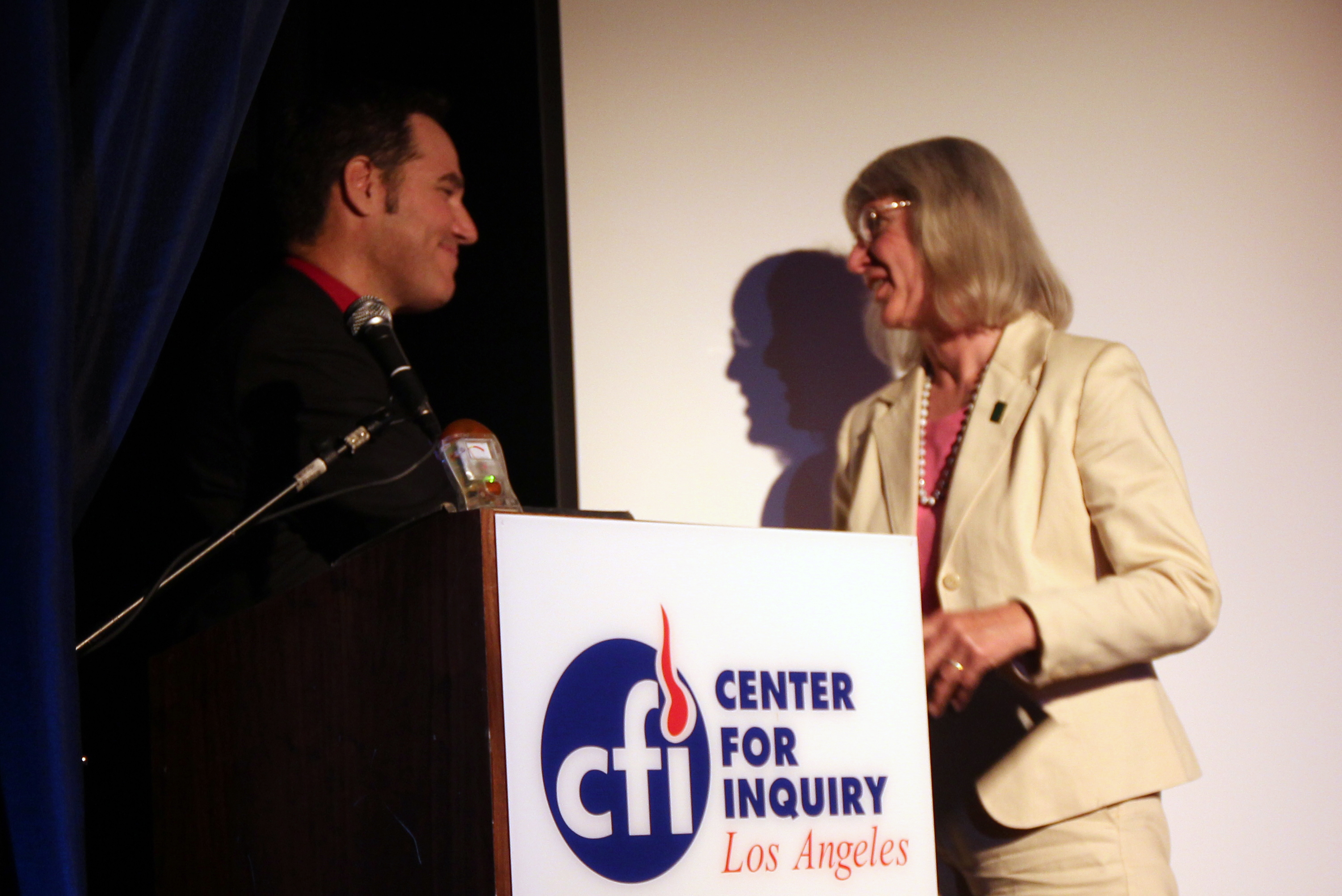
James Underdown director of Center for Inquiry West and Independent Investigations Group (IIG) West presents award from the IIG August 21, 2010.

Awards and Recognition
Year	Award	Awarded by	Description
1998	Isaac Asimov Science Award	American Humanist Association	Given to recognize specific accomplishments that advance humanism
1999	Bruce Alberts Award for Excellence in Science Education	American Society for Cell Biology	Awarded to an individual who has demonstrated innovative and sustained contributions to science education, with particular emphasis on the broad local, regional, and/or national impact
1999	First Amendment Award	Hugh Hefner Foundation	Recognizes the efforts of an individual in defending the First Amendment
2001	Public Service Award	Geological Society of America	Presented in honor of Gene and Carolyn Shoemaker, whose scientific work and generosity in sharing it inspired and stimulated the public's curiosity about the universe around them
2002	AIBS Outstanding Service Award	American Institute of Biological Sciences	Given annually in recognition of an individual's and organization's noteworthy service to the biological sciences, especially integrative and organismal biology
2002	National Science Board Public Service Award	National Science Board	The award recognizes outstanding contributions in communicating, promoting, or helping to develop broad public policy in science and engineering (Note: The Award has since been renamed the NSB Science and Society Award)
2002	Margaret Nicholson Distinguished Service Award	California Science Teachers Association	CSTA's highest honor, the citation commemorates Scott "in recognition of your many contributions to science education, your leadership and service, and your positive impact on the quality of science teaching in California."
2006	Anthropology in the Media Award	American Anthropological Association	Honors those who have raised public awareness of anthropology and have had a broad and sustained public impact at local, national, and international levels
2007	Outstanding Educator's Award	Exploratorium Museum	Recognizing Scott's work in science education
2007	Scientific Freedom and Responsibility Award	The American Association for the Advancement of Science	Honors scientists and engineers whose exemplary actions, often taken at significant personal cost, have served to foster scientific freedom and responsibility
2007	Viktor Hamburger Outstanding Educator Prize	Society for Developmental Biology	Recognises individuals who have made outstanding, innovative contributions to scientific teaching and learning.
2009	The Stephen J Gould Prize	Society for the Study of Evolution	Recognizes "individuals whose sustained and exemplary efforts have advanced public understanding of evolutionary science and its importance in biology, education, and everyday life in the spirit of Stephen Jay Gould."
2009	The Fellows Medal	California Academy of Sciences.	Awarded in recognition of a recipient's notable contributions to one or more of the natural sciences
2010	The Public Welfare Medal	U.S. National Academy of Sciences	"For championing the teaching of evolution in the United States and for providing leadership to the National Center for Science Education."
2012	The Richard Dawkins Award	Atheist Alliance of America	Awarded to individuals it judges to have raised the public consciousness of atheism
2014	Lifetime Achievement Award	American Humanist Association	Recognizes the accomplishments and work of the individuals reflecting humanist values up to the date of the award and in concert with the prevailing humanist thought of the time
2014	James Randi Award for Skepticism in the Public Interest	James Randi Educational Foundation	Award in recognition of Scott's outstanding achievements as an advocate for scientific skepticism and her promotion of science education
2018	The Pojeta Award	Paleontological Society	The award recognizes "exceptional professional or public service by individuals or groups in the field of paleontology above and beyond that of existing formal roles or responsibilities"
2019	Fellow for the German Skeptic group	Gesellschaft zur wissenschaftlichen Untersuchung von Parawissenschaften [English translation: Society for the Scientific Investigation of Parasciences]	Given to those who uphold scientific skepticism
2022	Lifetime Achievement Award	California Freethought Day Committee	"Under her leadership, NCSE fought against 'intelligent design' and climate change denial in public schools."

As of 2023 Scott has been the recipient of 10 honorary degrees.

Honorary Degrees
Year	Degree	Institution	Location
2003	Doctor of Science	McGill University	Québec, Canada
2005	Doctor of Science	Ohio State University	Columbus, OH
2006	Doctor of Science	Mount Holyoke College	South Hadley, MA
2006	Doctor of Science	University of Wisconsin	Milwaukee, WI
2007	Doctor of Science	Rutgers University	New Brunswick, NJ
2008	Doctor of Science	University of New Mexico	Albuquerque, NM
2010	Doctor of Science	University of Missouri-Columbia	Columbia, MO
2010	Doctor of Science	Colorado College	Colorado Springs, CO
2013	Honorary Doctorate	Chapman University	Orange, CA
2017	Honorary Doctorate	Transylvania University	Lexington, KY

== Personal life ==
Scott's husband, Thomas C. Sager, is a lawyer. They have one daughter and reside in Berkeley, California.

Scott is a backyard beekeeper with two beehives, and is interested in colony collapse disorder and an advocate of amateur beekeeping.

== Bibliography ==
- Eugenie C. Scott (2004). Evolution vs. Creationism: An Introduction. Berkeley & Los Angeles, California: University of California Press. ISBN 978-0-520-24650-8. "evolution vs. creationism." Also: Westport, Connecticut: Greenwood Press. ISBN 0-313-32122-1
- Eugenie C. Scott & Glenn Branch (2006). Not in Our Classrooms: Why Intelligent Design Is Wrong for Our Schools. Boston: Beacon Press. ISBN 978-0-8070-3278-7.
