= Judgment Day: Intelligent Design on Trial =

2007 American television documentary

- Genre: Documentary, science
- Narrated by: Jay O. Sanders
- Country of origin: United States
- Original language: English (U.S.)

Production
- Running time: 1 hour, 53 minutes
- Production companies: Vulcan Productions; Big Table Film Company

Original release
- Network: PBS
- Release: November 13, 2007

Judgment Day: Intelligent Design on Trial is a documentary on the case of Kitzmiller v. Dover Area School District—which concentrated on the question of whether or not intelligent design could be viewed as science and taught in school science class. It first aired on PBS stations nationwide, on November 13, 2007, with many reruns, and features interviews with the judge, witnesses, and lawyers as well as re-enacted scenes using the official transcript of the trial.

Judgment Day was produced by WGBH's NOVA and Vulcan Productions in association with the Big Table Film Company. The senior executive producer was Paula S. Apsell, the executive producer was Richard Hutton, and the producers were Joseph McMaster, Gary Johnstone, and Vanessa Tovell. The senior producer was Susanne Simpson. Johnstone and McMaster served as directors, and McMaster was the writer.

In April 2008 the documentary won a Peabody Award. It won the 2008 Science Journalism Award presented by the American Association for the Advancement of Science to honor excellence in science reporting.

== Summary ==
When the school board in Dover, Pennsylvania, votes to require science teachers to read a statement touting intelligent design as a scientific alternative to Darwin's Theory of Evolution, parents sue the district, leading to a trial in which the judge must decide if intelligent design is merely a new name for creationism, already barred in public school science classes as being religious in nature.

== Response ==
The documentary was received positively by many scientific organizations. It was praised by Nature, and described as accurate by the National Center for Science Education. Variety magazine also gave the documentary a positive review, and said it was one of the year's most important television projects, that "should be shown not just in every U.S. high school but in houses of worship as well."

In contrast, creationists and intelligent design supporters have criticized the documentary. The Discovery Institute produced a website critical of the broadcast, while Answers in Genesis argued the evidence for evolution presented by scientists in Judgment Day was fallacious. The Institute for Creation Research (ICR) also claimed the film was not balanced.

WKNO-TV, the local PBS affiliate in Memphis, Tennessee, initially decided not to air the documentary because of the "controversial nature" of the subject, but later reversed its decision.

== See also ==
- List of works on intelligent design
- John E. Jones III
- List of Nova episodes
