= Uncommon Dissent =

2004 anthology edited by William A. Dembski

Uncommon Dissent: Intellectuals Who Find Darwinism Unconvincing
- Cover
- Editor: William A. Dembski
- Language: English
- Subject: Intelligent design
- Publisher: ISI Books
- Publication date: June 2004
- Publication place: United States
- Media type: Print (Hardcover and Paperback)
- Pages: 366
- ISBN: 1-932236-31-7
- OCLC: 55653649
- Dewey Decimal: 576.8/2
- LC Class: BL263 .U53 2004
- Preceded by: No Free Lunch
- Followed by: Debating Design: From Darwin to DNA

Uncommon Dissent: Intellectuals Who Find Darwinism Unconvincing is a 2004 anthology edited by William A. Dembski in which fifteen intellectuals, eight of whom are leading intelligent design proponents associated with the Discovery Institute's Center for Science and Culture (CSC) and the International Society for Complexity, Information and Design (ISCID), criticise "Darwinism" and make a case for intelligent design. It is published by the publishing wing of the paleoconservative Intercollegiate Studies Institute. The foreword is by John Wilson, editor of the evangelical Christian magazine Christianity Today. The title is a pun on the principle of biology known as common descent. The Discovery Institute is the engine behind the intelligent design movement.

== Contributors ==
The fifteen dissenting intellectuals are:

- William A. Dembski, mathematician, philosopher, theologian, leading intelligent design proponent, CSC Senior Fellow, ISCID Founder
- Robert Koons, philosopher, theologian, Christian apologist, CSC Fellow, ISCID Fellow
- Phillip E. Johnson, law professor, Christian apologist, "father" of the intelligent design movement, CSC Program Advisor
- late Marcel-Paul Schützenberger, mathematician
- Nancy R. Pearcey, Christian apologist, CSC Fellow
- Edward Sisson, attorney
- J. Budziszewski, philosopher, CSC Fellow, ISCID Fellow
- Frank J. Tipler, mathematical physicist, ISCID Fellow
- Michael J. Behe, biochemist, leading intelligent design proponent, CSC Senior Fellow, ISCID Fellow
- Michael John Denton, biochemist
- James Barham, independent scholar
- Cornelius G. Hunter, biophysicist, CSC Fellow, ISCID Fellow
- Roland F. Hirsch, analytical chemist
- Christopher Michael Langan, ISCID Fellow
- David Berlinski, popular mathematics author, CSC Senior Fellow

Phillip E. Johnson's contribution is a reprint of his 1990 First Things essay "Evolution as Dogma". Marcel-Paul Schützenberger's "The Miracles of Darwinism" is a reprint of a 1996 interview with La Recherche. David Berlinski's "The Deniable Darwin" is a reprint of a 1996 Commentary essay, along with his responses to critics. The other contributions were specifically commissioned for Uncommon Dissent.

In a 2004 review on its Web site, the Discovery Institute's Center for Science and Culture describes Uncommon Dissent as "a summary of the widespread attack upon Darwinism by some of today’s leading intellectuals." Mathematics professor and intelligent-design critic Jason Rosenhouse points out that the subtitle says "intellectuals", not "scientists", and adds that "[v]ery few of the contributors hold PhD's in any field related to biology. ... The ID folks are constantly telling us that evolution is failing as a scientific paradigm, and that scientists are jumping ship in droves. But when they have a chance to put together an anthology of testimonials authored by people who dissent from modern evolutionary theory, they have to resort to philosophers, lawyers or scientists who do not work in any field related to biology."

== Topics addressed ==
The book contains four sections: Part I: A Crisis of Confidence; Part II: Darwinism's Cultural Inroads; Part III: Leaving the Darwinian Fold; and Part IV: Auditing the Books. Part I, consisting of three essays, offers opinions on why Darwinism is questioned by the public at large. Part II, consisting of four essays, discusses the authors' opinions on the effects Darwinism has had on society and culture. Part III, consisting of three essays, deals with the personal intellectual journeys of contributors Behe, Denton, and Barham, whose attitudes toward Darwinism have changed through their lives. Part IV, consisting of four essays, presents the authors' opinions on the consistency and scope of Darwinism.

The book's introduction characterizes Darwinism by the "central claim" that "an unguided physical process can account for the emergence of all biological complexity and diversity".

Contributor James Barham argues that "it is incorrect to simply equate Darwinism with belief in evolution." He distinguishes empirical Darwinism ("the idea that the formation of new species is due to random changes in individual organisms that happen to be 'selected' by the environment") from metaphysical Darwinism (the claim that "the theory of natural selection has successfully reduced all teleological and normative phenomena to the interplay of chance and necessity, thus eliminating purpose and value from our picture of the world"). For Barham, the "real problem with the evolution debate" is not empirical Darwinism, but a sort of "theory creep" in which a "bold but circumscribed scientific claim" (empirical Darwinism) becomes conflated with "a much more sweeping philosophical claim" (metaphysical Darwinism).

Robert C. Koons says in Uncommon Dissent that "if evolution is defined broadly enough, there's little doubt that it has occurred." He sees the "defining differential element" of the modern synthesis as the view that "the probability of the occurrence of any mutation is unrelated to its prospective contribution to the functionality of any structure, present or future", and argues that "the natural presumption about the cause of life" lies against this view, and instead with a teleological "intelligent agency position".

Contributor Edward Sisson sees the key question in the debate over biological evolution as whether all life is "the result of chance events occurring in DNA (or perhaps elsewhere) that are then 'selected' in some fashion without the need of any guiding intelligence", thereby undergoing "unintelligent evolution", or whether at least some of the diversity of life on earth can be explained only through "intelligent evolution", in which "an intelligent designer (or designers)" causes preexisting species to undergo designed changes in DNA. His view is that "no data has been found that amounts to real evidence for unintelligent evolution as the explanation for the diversity of life", that "science is ignorant of how the diversity of life came to be", and that "an intelligent cause is necessary to explain at least some of the diversity of life as we see it".

== Reception by the scientific community ==
Evolution has broad acceptance within the scientific community, and that community rejects intelligent design, with critics such as Barbara Forrest and Paul R. Gross saying that design proponents seek to destroy evolution and that they employ intentional ambiguity and conflation in using "Darwinism" synonymously with evolution.

Of Uncommon Dissent computational physicist and an assistant professor of physics Taner Edis writes:

"...they appear to have taken this as an excuse for an astounding display of pomposity, conspiracy theorizing to explain why their brilliance has been rejected by mainstream science, and patting themselves on the back for intellectual courage. Surely the authors do not expect the sort of posturing they engage in to get them a sympathetic hearing in scientific circles—so what does all this amount to? An excuse for an all-out culture war, since obviously mainstream science is so corrupt it will not change its evil Darwinian ways unless forced to repent by outsiders?" --Taner Edis

The testimony of Barbara Forrest in the 2005 Kitzmiller v. Dover Area School District trial contributed to the ruling that intelligent design is not science and essentially religious in nature. In her expert witness report Forrest presented Nancy R. Pearcey's section in Uncommon Dissent as evidence of that religious nature.

Evolutionary and historical researcher John M. Lynch describes Uncommon Dissent:

"a collection of (largely) non-scientists bemoaning evolution and its perceived moral effects while rehashing arguments lifted from older anti-evolutionary sources. The tone is the usual paranoid delusion that American creationism seems to specialize in; Darwinism is an 'ideology' which exhibits 'overweening ambition', it’s a theory that is held 'dogmatically and even ruthlessly' by the 'Darwinian thought police' who are 'as insidious as any secret police at ensuring conformity and rooting out dissent'." --John M. Lynch

Of the fifteen intellectuals in the book he says:

"It's indicative of something that the initial best case for the failure of Darwinism is given by a philosopher (Koons) with no apparent background in biology and the last word is given to an eight year old piece by a popularizer of mathematics, novelist, and 'accomplished poet'. In between we get a poor sandwich—all filling and no substance." --John M. Lynch

== See also ==
- Wedge strategy
- Intelligent design movement
- Teach the Controversy
