= Stanley L. Weinberg =

American activist

Stanley L. Weinberg (August 21, 1911 – March 28, 2001) was the founder of the National Center for Science Education.

In 1982, Weinberg received the Iowa Academy of Science Distinguished Service Award. In 1987, he was awarded the AAAS Scientific Freedom and Responsibility Award, which he shared with Francisco J. Ayala and Norman Newall.

== Bibliography ==
- Weinberg, Stanley L. (1966). Biology: An Inquiry Into the Nature of Life. Allyn and Bacon. ISBN 978-0205044870.
