= Jay Wexler =

American legal scholar (born 1969)

- Born: April 12, 1969 (age 57)
- Education: Harvard University (BA); University of Chicago (MA); Stanford University (JD)
- Occupation: Law professor
- Employer: Boston University School of Law
- Known for: Studying laughter at the U.S. Supreme Court

Jay D. Wexler (born April 12, 1969) is an American legal scholar known for being the first to study laughter at the Supreme Court of the United States. His work also focuses on church-state issues, constitutional law, and environmental law. Wexler is a professor of law at the Boston University School of Law.

== Biography ==
Wexler earned a B.A., magna cum laude in East Asian Studies from Harvard University in 1991, his M.A. in religious studies from the University of Chicago Divinity School in 1993, and his J.D. from Stanford Law School in 1997, where he was a notes editor on the Stanford Law Review and a semifinalist in the Kirkwood Moot Court competition. After law school, Wexler clerked for Judge David Tatel on the United States Court of Appeals for the District of Columbia Circuit and for Justice Ruth Bader Ginsburg at the Supreme Court of the United States. He was an attorney advisor at the Department of Justice Office of Legal Counsel from 1999 to 2001. Wexler began teaching at Boston University School of Law in 2001 and became a tenured professor in 2007.

Wexler has appeared on National Public Radio's All Things Considered and On Point, CNBC, C-SPAN, State of Belief, the Brian Lehrer Show, New Hampshire Public Radio's Word of Mouth, and has been featured in Leah Remini: Scientology and the Aftermath and Hail Satan? He is admitted to the bar in Illinois and Massachusetts.

== Supreme Court laughter ==
In 2005, Wexler's pioneering research counted the number of times each Supreme Court justice generated laughter in the courtroom, as indicated in the official transcript, as well as each Justice's "Laughter Episodes Instigated Per Argument Average," by dividing each justice's total laughs for the 2004–2005 term by the number of oral arguments he or she attended. This inquiry determining "the relative funniness of the Justices" was replicated by Wexler in 2007. Since then, other scholars have built on these initial studies and seriously examined how laughter is used by the justices at the Supreme Court.

== Publications ==
In addition to laughter during sessions of the Supreme Court of the United States, Wexler's research focuses on church-state issues and environmental law. He also writes legal fiction.

=== Books ===
==== Weed Rules: Blazing the Way to a Just and Joyful Marijuana Policy (2023) ====
The book argues that states which have legalized cannabis should adopt a "careful exuberance" approach to regulating the drug rather than the "grudging tolerance" they typically use now. Wexler suggests that a commitment to equity and joy should guide cannabis policy.

==== Our Non-Christian Nation: How Atheists, Satanists, Pagans, and Others are Demanding their Rightful Place in Public Life (2019) ====
The book examines how a smaller portion of the United States population identifies as Christian than in the past, and how the growing non-Christian religions are using the law to assert themselves and create a more diverse public square. Wexler travels the country to obtain first hand accounts of the religious disputes of the Summum in Salt Lake City, Wiccans in Wisconsin, Atheists in Greece, New York, and Muslims in North Carolina.

==== When God isn't Green: A World-Wide Journey to Places Where Religious Practice and Environmentalism Collide (2016) ====
The book details his trips to sites where religious practices negatively impact the environment. Because large groups of people engage in these practices, it is the harm caused by the cumulative practice that needs to be weighed against religious freedom.

==== Tuttle in the Balance (2015) ====
Wexler's first novel follows a United States Supreme Court Justice during a midlife crisis. Although the story is satirical, it also examines serious legal issues such as filming Supreme Court arguments. Ultimately, the story is a reminder that Supreme Court justices are ordinary people.

==== The Adventures of Ed Tuttle, Associate Justice: and Other Stories (2012) ====
Wexler's first collection of short stories takes readers to disparate places: a zoo where all of the animals are black and white, a children's camp where they have to collect clams, Justice Sonia Sotomayor's confirmation hearing run by the 1977 Kansas City Royals, and Henry Clay's advice to various people. The title story about Justice Ed Tuttle trying to pick up women while on vacation was expanded into Wexler's novel, Tuttle in the Balance.

==== The Odd Clauses: Understanding the Constitution Through Ten of its Most Curious Provisions (2012) ====
The book discusses ten of the lesser known parts of the United States Constitution. He examines provisions regarding incompatibility, weights and measures, recess appointments, original jurisdiction, natural-born citizens, the Twenty-First Amendment, letters of marque and reprisal, titles of nobility, bills of attainder, and the Third Amendment. This book, like much of Wexler's work, seeks to educate and entertain, and while some enjoy this "fresh vantage point," others find it distracting. Wexler also authored a blog called Odd Clauses Watch with news about other odd clauses that did not make the book.

==== Holy Hullabaloos: A Road Trip to the Battlegrounds of the Church/State Wars (2009) ====
This book details his journey to the sites of recent separation of church and state judicial opinions.

=== Humor publications ===
In addition to studying which justices are funny, Wexler has authored numerous humor pieces. His first foray into humor publishing explained how it is possible to get 100% of one's daily recommended allowance of vitamins and minerals by eating mass quantities of junk food. Wexler frequently writes about the Supreme Court of the United States, including his clerkship with Justice Ruth Bader Ginsburg and alternate reality confirmation hearings for the justices. Wexler also writes about legal oddities, including how legislation limits Woodsy the Owl's effectiveness. Although most of Wexler's humor writings are law-related, he has also written general humor pieces.

=== Academic articles ===
Wexler has written numerous academic articles examining constitutional law, law and religion, environmental law, and intersections thereof. He has made significant contributions to the discourse surrounding the teaching of religion, particularly intelligent design, in American public schools. Wexler's work has been published in journals such as the Journal of Interdisciplinary History, the Journal of Legal Metrics, New England Law Review, and Texas Law Review. His work has been cited by two federal circuit courts, two federal district courts, and the Vermont Supreme Court. His most cited articles include

- "Defending the Middle Way: Intermediate Scrutiny as Judicial Minimalism", 66 George Washington Law Review 298 (1998): Wexler illustrates the merits of Cass Sunstein's judicial minimalism, discusses the intermediate scrutiny standard, argues that it is better than a sliding-scale approach, but acknowledges the Supreme Court of the United States can manipulate this standard.
- "Darwin, Design, and Disestablishment: Teaching the Evolution Controversy in Public Schools", 56 Vanderbilt Law Review 751 (2003): Wexler examines the Santorum Amendment to the No Child Left Behind Act and finds that teaching intelligent design in public schools would violate the Establishment Clause.
- "Of Pandas, People, and the First Amendment: The Constitutionality of Teaching Intelligent Design in the Public Schools", 49 Stanford Law Review 439 (1997): Wexler was one of the first legal scholars to contend that intelligent design is a religious belief and that teaching it in public schools would violate the Establishment Clause. He argued intelligent design should be considered religious belief regardless of whether it is evaluated under a "content-based" or a "functional" definition of religion. Wexler noted that intelligent design could also be considered scientific, but that the religious nature of the theory should preclude it being taught in public schools. Conversely, he argued that evolution is scientific and should not be considered a religious belief because "[i]t does not address the question of origins nor does it postulate the meaning of life. It deals only with proximate causes, not ultimate ones."
- "Preparing for the Clothed Public Square: Teaching about Religion, Civic Education, and the Constitution", 43 William and Mary Law Review 1159 (2001-2002): Wexler distinguishes teaching about religion from teaching religious beliefs, and argues children should be taught about various religions that exert significant influence in societies around the world.

== Honors and awards ==
Wexler received numerous awards as a student at Stanford Law School. He was awarded the Steven M. Block Civil Liberties Award and the Irving J. Hellmann Jr. Award for his student note published in the Stanford Law Review.

Wexler is a two-time Fulbright Scholar (2007–2008 and 2014–2015), and was selected for the Michael Melton Award for Excellence in Teaching in 2009.

== See also ==
- List of law clerks for the sixth seat of the Supreme Court of the United States
- List of works on intelligent design
