= North Mason School District =

School district in Washington, United States

Address
- 250 East Campus Drive Belfair, Mason County, Washington, 98528; United States
- Coordinates: 47.41442°N 122.84082°W

District information
- Grades: Pre-K – 12^{th}
- Superintendent: Dana Rosenbach
- Asst. superintendent(s): Denise Neshem
- Business administrator: Ashley Supry
- NCES District ID: 5305790
- District ID: WA-23403

Students and staff
- Students: 2,330 (2018-19)
- Teachers: 140 (2017-18)
- Student–teacher ratio: 16.64
- Athletic conference: Olympic League

Other information
- Website: www.nmsd.wednet.edu

North Mason School District is a public school district that serves North Mason County, Washington.

== Schools ==
=== High schools ===
- North Mason High School (Belfair)
- James A. Taylor High School

=== Middle school ===
- Hawkins Middle School

=== Elementary schools ===
- Belfair Elementary
- Sandhill Elementary

== Notable alumni ==
- David Skelly
- CJ Allen (c/o 2013)
