= James Le Fanu =

British medical journalist, author (born 1950)

- Born: 1950 (age 75–76)
- Education: Clare College, Cambridge
- Occupations: Medical journalist and author
- Notable work: The Rise and Fall of Modern Medicine (1999)
- Awards: Los Angeles Times Book Prize

James Le Fanu (born 1950) is a British retired general practitioner, journalist and author, best known for his weekly columns in the Daily and Sunday Telegraph. He is married to publisher Juliet Annan.

== Life ==
Le Fanu was educated at Ampleforth College and graduated from Clare College, Cambridge, and the Royal London Hospital in 1974, and worked as a junior doctor at the Renal Transplant Unit and Cardiology Department of the Royal Free Hospital and St Mary's Hospital in London. For 20 years he combined working as a general practitioner with writing medical columns for the Sunday Telegraph and Daily Telegraph as well as contributing reviews and articles to The Times, The Spectator, The British Medical Journal and Journal of the Royal Society of Medicine. His books include The Rise and Fall of Modern Medicine (1999), which won the Los Angeles Times Book Prize in 2000, Why Us?: How science rediscovered the mystery of ourselves (2009) and Too Many Pills: How too much medicine is endangering our health and what we can do about it (2018).

In an interview in the British Medical Journal in 2015, he was described as having "spent the past 30 years shedding light in places that others believed to be already illuminated. Prescient and provocative, Le Fanu is the goad to keep doctors humble and scientists on the right track." He admitted the worst mistake in his career was to mistake potassium for aminophylline causing his patient to have a cardiac arrest, "though luckily the crash team did not get stuck in the lift or ask too many searching questions.".

He was elected a Fellow of the Royal College of Physicians in 2014.

== Medicine ==
In his book The Rise and Fall of Modern Medicine, Le Fanu challenges the conventional view of the history of post-war medicine as a continuous upwards curve of knowledge and achievement. Rather, he argues, it falls into two distinct phases, a "Golden Age", from the 1940s to the 1970s whose twelve "definitive moments" include antibiotics, cortisone, open heart surgery, kidney transplants, the cure of childhood leukaemia, etc. Le Fanu claims that this was followed, for complex reasons, by a decline in the rate of therapeutic innovation creating an intellectual vacuum filled by two complementary scientific disciplines, epidemiology and genetics, that sought to explain the causes of disease. They were "The Social Theory" that attributed common illnesses such as circulatory disorders and cancer to a "high fat" diet and unhealthy lifestyle and "the New Genetics" that promised to identify the genetic causes of ill health. Le Fanu asserts that these two disciplines continue to dominate medical research but that their promise remains unfulfilled.

His 2018 book, Too Many Pills, investigates the reasons behind the threefold rise in the number of prescriptions issued by doctors in Britain over the prior 15 years and the consequences for many of what he calls a "hidden epidemic" of drug-induced illness.

== Evolution ==
Le Fanu is an open critic of materialism (scientism) and the explanatory power of Darwin's evolutionary theory whose fundamental premises he argued in his book Why Us? are undermined by the findings of the two revolutionary technical developments of genome sequencing and brain imaging. Le Fanu claims that the discovery of the equivalence of genomes across the vast range of organismic complexity has failed to identify the numerous random genetic mutations that, according to Darwinian theory, would account for the diversity of form of the living world. As for neuroscience, he claims that while sophisticated PET and MRI scanning techniques allow scientists to observe the brain in action from the inside, the fundamental question of how its electrochemistry translates into subjective experience and consciousness remains unresolved.

According to the New Scientist, Le Fanu argues for the existence of a non-material "life force" that may explain many of the mysteries unexplained by material science. Le Fanu is not a creationist but "makes the argument for a non-materialist realm of both cosmic and psychic creation".

== Quotes ==
"Statistically based knowledge is not reliable. A classic example is the 2008 crash. That was based on a mathematical algorithm."

== See also ==
- Bryan Appleyard
- Richard Milton
