= Howard J. Van Till =

American physicist and academic (1938–2024)

Howard J. Van Till (November 28, 1938 – July 31, 2024) was an American physicist and emeritus professor of physics at Calvin College, where he taught for 31 years. His research included solid state physics and millimeter-wave astronomy. He is also noted as a writer on science and Christianity.

== Early life ==
Van Till was born in 1938 and grew up on a farm in California. When he was a child, he took a bottle of turkey medication from his parents' farm, mixed it with some mineral powders, and shook it; this resulted in the bottle exploding, causing him to lose a considerable amount of blood from his jugular vein.

== Religious views ==
Van Till was brought up as a Calvinist, and known for such beliefs for much of his life. He has been active in writing and speaking on the interaction of science and Christian belief, for example as a member of the editorial boards of Science and Christian Belief and Theology and Science, and working with the Templeton Foundation.

In 2006 he gave a presentation to the Freethought Association of West Michigan in which he recounted that he had less certainty than before on some religious questions. He now attends a more liberal church.

=== Opposition to creationism ===
In 1986 Van Till published The Fourth Day, which sought to reconcile Christianity with Darwinist science. Writing in 2006, Russell D. Moore described this work as "monumental", and Van Till as "the most lauded and prolific defender of theistic evolution among American evangelicals".

In 1988 Van Till co-wrote Science Held Hostage: What's wrong with creation science and evolution with Davis A. Young and Clarence Menninga.

He was publicly accused of heresy after the issue of The Fourth Day, and Van Till's professorship was subject for four years to a monthly review of his beliefs and eligibility to teach at Calvin College. He continued to teach until 1999, but his Calvinist faith was affected by the inquiry.

An article of his in 1996, claiming that theistic evolution was compatible with the teaching of renowned church fathers Augustine and Basil, drew rebuttals from Jonathan Wells and John Mark Reynolds, to which Van Till responded in turn.

Ronald L. Numbers in 1998 stated that Van Till is a devout Christian who sees little or no evidence of God in nature and whose view is a good example of "theistic evolution". However, Numbers records that Van Till prefers the term "creationomic perspective" over "theistic evolution".

In a February 2016 article in Theology and Science: "SOBIG; A Symposium on Belief in God", he now describes his theological and philosophical view as "a comprehensive but non-reductive naturalism".

Van Till died on July 31, 2024, at the age of 85.
