= Glenn Branch =

American critic of creationism

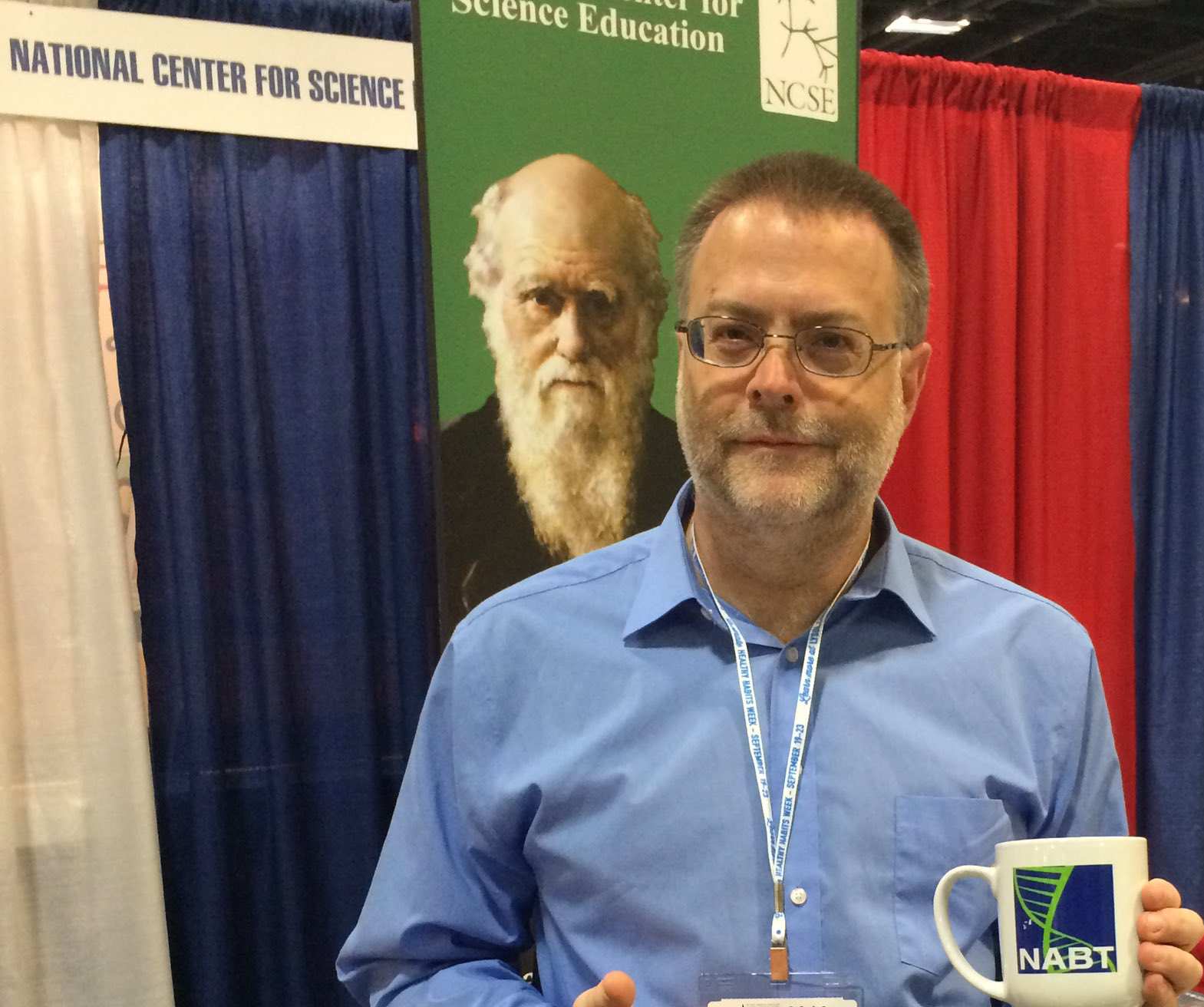
- Education: University of California, Los Angeles (MA)
- Years active: 2002 to current
- Employer: National Center for Science Education
- Notable work: "Not in Our Classrooms: Why Intelligent Design is Wrong for Our Schools"
- Title: Deputy Director, NCSE

Notes
- Voice of Glenn Branch

Glenn Branch is the deputy director of the National Center for Science Education. He is a prominent critic of creationism and intelligent design and an activist against campaigns of suppressing teaching of evolution and climate change in school education. He is also a fellow with the Committee for Skeptical Inquiry.

== Early life ==
Branch earned his Master of Arts degree in philosophy from the University of California, Los Angeles. He won The Rudolph and Ina Carnap Prize for excellent philosophical writing by a graduate student in 1997–98, and the Yost Prize For Excellence In Teaching in 1994–95. He joined the National Center for Science Education in 1999 and has served as the deputy director since 2002. Branch is member of editorial boards of multiple journals.

== Advocacy ==
Branch is a prominent critic of creationism and intelligent design having published multiple papers on both. He emphasizes the need of appreciating creationists' actions at the different levels of educational governance, and the need to change tactics in fighting against them. He believes scientists are in a unique position to defend the teaching of evolution, both by resisting creationist incursions as they occur and by helping to improve the teaching of evolution at both the precollege and college levels. Branch criticized how creationists call evolution a theory in an NPR interview. "In everyday conversation, a theory is a hunch or guess,... That's not how scientists use it. For scientists, a theory is a systematic explanation for a range of natural phenomena."

Branch was involved in the campaign against the Discovery Institutes' "Teach the Controversy," a challenge to the key principles of Darwinian evolution based on an annotated bibliography of 44 peer-reviewed scientific article which were said to raise doubts about Darwin's theories. The bibliography title "Bibliography of Supplementary Resources for Ohio Science Education" was analyzed by the staff of the National Center for Science Education (NCSE) with the assistance of many of the authors of the publications listed in it, finding that the Discovery Institute (1) misrepresented the significance of the publications in the Bibliography, (2) described the publications in the Bibliography in a frequently inaccurate and tendentious manner, and (3) fails to present any principled basis for the publications selected nor any pedagogical rationale for the use of the publications in the classroom. NCSE concluded that the only purpose of the Discovery Institute's Bibliography was to mislead members of the Board of Education and of the public about the status of evolution. In an opinion piece written with Eugenie Scott, the coauthors stated that it "is scientifically inappropriate and pedagogically irresponsible to teach that scientists seriously debate the validity of evolution."

Branch was also highly involved in the effort to combat New Mexico's proposed change in Science standards in 2017. NCSE coordinated the effort to educate the public through journalists and activists and was able to successfully affect the regulators. As a result of the campaign, the New Mexico's Public Education Department announced that instead of the flawed standards originally proposed, it would be adopting the Next Generation Science Standards.

Branch is a vocal critic against the movement of climate denial. He believes one of the most effective ways to improve awareness of climate change is through school education by science teachers. He states that this is a difficult task due to multiple issues of limited federal role, state attacks on science, local attitudes, etc. An increase of bills aimed at changing standards for climate science education introduced by state officials in early 2019 has signaled concern. "The only way to be sure they don't pass is to raise public awareness of them and to localize concerns about the integrity of public science education by speaking about them."

Glenn Branch discusses the history of flat Earth at SkeptiCal Conference 2019.

At the 2019 SkeptiCal conference held in San Francisco, Branch presented a history of the Flat Earth movement which began in 1819 and evolved into the movement of today. He attributes the resurgence of the movement to a YouTube video posted in 2011 entitled "The Globe Model Attempts to Deceive the Public." According to Branch, the old flat earth theory focused on creationism is dying out, while the new version is fueled by social media feeding conspiracy theories to people and pushing them further down the rabbit hole. Ultimately, Branch thinks the craze is going to fail for a lack of consensus between methods. Susan Gerbic agrees with Branch, stating "...they also don't have scientists, strong leaders, and an organization." In closing his talk, Branch said "National Center for Science Education will be there to fight," no matter what happens.

Interviewed for the New York Times in 2022, Branch emphasizes that state curriculum does not devote much time to the teaching of climate change. There is "hardly enough time to teach the essentials ... They need to learn, at the very least, the fundamentals of climate science, including the role humans play, the consequences of a changing climate, as well as solutions". Branch says that state standards should be updated more often and climate change given a bigger role in those standards.

== Selected publications ==
- Branch, Glenn; Scott, Eugenie C (1 October 2003). "Evolution: what's wrong with 'teaching the controversy'". Trends in Ecology & Evolution. 18 (10): 499–502. doi:10.1016/S0169-5347(03)00218-0. ISSN 0169-5347.
- In 2006 Glenn Branch co-edited the book "Not in Our Classrooms: Why Intelligent Design is Wrong for Our Schools" with Eugenie Carol Scott
- Branch, Glenn; Scott, Eugenie C. (2009). "The Latest Face of Creationism". Scientific American. 300 (1): 92–99. Bibcode:2009SciAm.300a..92B. doi:10.1038/scientificamerican0109-92. PMID 19186756. S2CID 7660463.
- Scott, Eugenie C.; Branch, Glenn (1 March 2009). "Don't Call it "Darwinism"". Evolution: Education and Outreach. 2 (1): 90–94. doi:10.1007/s12052-008-0111-2. ISSN 1936-6426.
- Branch, Glenn; Scott, Eugenie C. (2009). "The Latest Face of Creationism". Scientific American. 300 (1): 92–99. Bibcode:2009SciAm.300a..92B. doi:10.1038/scientificamerican0109-92. JSTOR 26001427. PMID 19186756. S2CID 7660463.
- Robbins, Richard H.; Cohen, Mark Nathan (2015). Darwin and the Bible: The Cultural Confrontation. Routledge. pp. Chapter 10. ISBN 9781317349013. Archived from the original on 29 August 2021.
- Glenn Branch and Ann Reid's "50 Years Ago: Repeal of Tennessee's 'Monkey Law'" was selected for inclusion in "The Science Behind the Debates," a special edition of Scientific American dated December 2017.
