= Richard Milton (author) =

British journalist (born 1943)

- Born: 1943 (age 82–83); London
- Occupations: Writer; journalist
- Writing career
- Period: Contemporary
- Genres: Fiction; nonfiction
- Subject: Controversies

Richard Milton (born 1943) is a British journalist and amateur archaeologist. An engineer by training, he has written on the topics of popular history, business, and alternative science, and he has published one novel.

== Work and reception ==
Milton's books, especially those on scientific controversies, have been roundly rejected. To his critics, Milton is a contrarian who engages in controversy for its own sake, while to his supporters, he is a writer unafraid to tackle uncomfortable subjects and orthodoxies that have become dogmas. Milton is shunned in the field of evolution, as he is a neo-Lamarckian who has supported the experiments of Paul Kammerer.

His first book, The Facts of Life: Shattering the Myths of Darwinism (1993), is a non-religious creationist attack on evolutionary biology, following the arguments of "creation science". It presents an "idiosyncratic collection of scientific anomalies purported to support the fallacies of Darwinism", referencing fringe figures such as Rupert Sheldrake. It has been met with intense criticism from many mainstream academic reviewers. In the New Statesman, Oxford evolutionary biologist Richard Dawkins described it as "twaddle that betrays, on almost every page, complete and total pig-ignorance of the subject at hand", characterising its central thesis as being as silly as "a claim that the Romans never existed and the Latin language is a cunning Victorian fabrication to keep schoolmasters employed". In a review in Third Way, Douglas Spanner, while suggesting that the book should be taken seriously by orthodox Darwinism, is dubious about Milton's attempts to dispute traditional methods of estimating the Earth's age and says, "on matters of biological importance he can be off-course at times".

Reviewing Milton's second book, Forbidden Science: Suppressed Research That Could Change Our Lives (1996) in New Scientist, Harry Collins was generally positive about much of the book but criticised Milton's failure to "draw a line between what might be worth a shot and what is simply daft":

Where Milton has right on his side is that every supposedly timeless formula for describing pathological science applies equally to a great deal of admirable science. This is the case even for the famous set of criteria invented by Irving Langmuir, which is still trotted out whenever scientific pundits want to give their brains a rest. Where Milton is wrong is in imagining this means we must sympathise with every heterodoxy. There are so many heterodoxies that, were we to do this, there would be no science left.

— Review: The burdens of choice

Milton's claims have been criticised as pseudoscience by philosophy professor Robert Carroll. Milton appeared on The Mysterious Origins of Man, a television special arguing that mankind has lived on Earth for tens of millions of years and that mainstream scientists have suppressed supporting evidence.

His claims on the age of mankind have also been criticised for scientific inaccuracy.

== Publications ==
=== Nonfiction ===
- The Facts of Life: Shattering the Myths of Darwinism. London: Corgi. 1993. ISBN 0-552-14121-6.
  - published as Il Mystero Della Vita, Editoriale Armenia, 1993 (Italy)
  - published by Sinkosha Publishing, 1995 (Japan)
  - published as O Mythos tou Darwinismou 1996 (Greece), Park Street Press, 1997 (US Hardback, US Paperback)
  - Shattering the Myths of Darwinism. Rochester: Park Street Press. 2000. ISBN 978-0-89281-884-6.
- Forbidden Science. City: Trafalgar Square. 1996. ISBN 1-85702-302-1.
  - published as Verbotene Wissenschaften, Zweitausendeins, 1996 (Germany)
  - republished as Verbotene Wissenschaften, Kopp Verlag, 2014 (Germany)
- Alternative Science: Challenging the Myths of the Scientific Establishment. Rochester: Park Street Press. 1996. ISBN 0-89281-631-7.
- Bad Company. London: House of Stratus Ltd. 2001. ISBN 0-7551-0151-0.
- Best of Enemies. London: Icon. 2007. ISBN 978-1-84046-828-1.

=== Fiction ===
- Dead Secret. London: House of Stratus. 2000. ISBN 0-7551-0178-2.

== See also ==
- James Le Fanu
