= National Center for Science Education =

Nonprofit advocacy group supporting the teaching of evolution and climate change

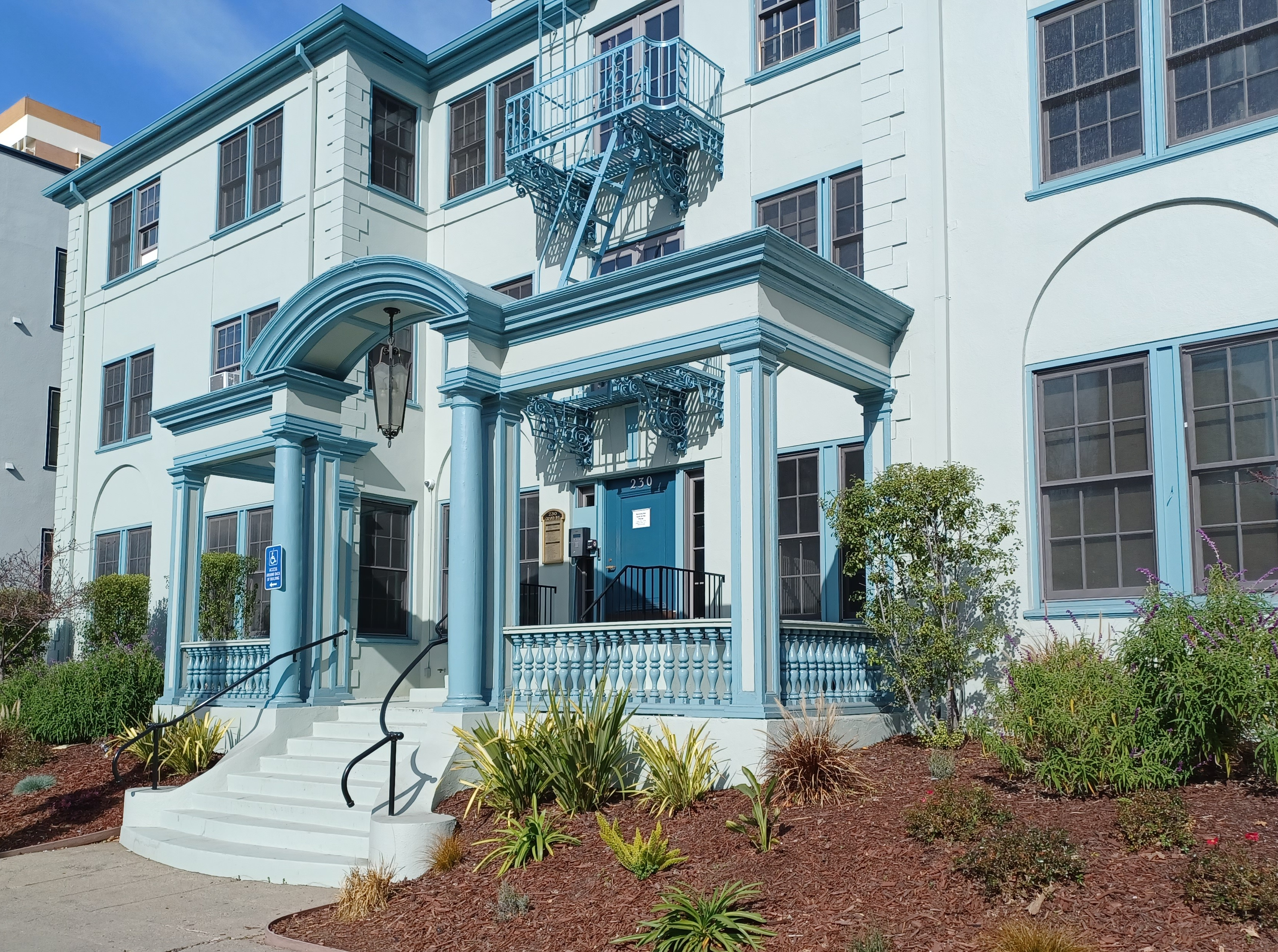
- Founded: 1981; 45 years ago
- Founder: Stanley L. Weinberg
- Type: Nonprofit advocacy group
- Purpose: Promoting science education and countering anti-science public policy
- Location: Oakland, CA, United States.
- Method: Educational training, science education research, political organizing and advocacy
- Key people: Amanda L. Townley, Executive Director
- Website: ncse.ngo

The National Center for Science Education (NCSE) is a not-for-profit membership advocacy group in the United States whose stated mission is to "promote and defend" science education. The historical focus of the organization has been on educating the press and the public on the scientific and educational aspects of controversies surrounding the teaching of evolution and climate change. The NCSE opposes efforts to incorporate religious and pseudoscientific concepts into public school science education.

The NCSE is based in Oakland, California. As of 2012, its membership included more than 4,500 "scientists, teachers, clergy, and citizens of varied religious and political affiliations."

The NCSE is a member of the National Coalition Against Censorship and is affiliated with the American Association for the Advancement of Science (AAAS).

== History ==
In 1980 Stanley L. Weinberg, a high school teacher in Iowa, began to organize statewide Committees of Correspondence "committed to the defense of education in evolutionary theory," based upon the committees of correspondence in pre-Revolutionary America. Their purpose was to keep interested parties informed about creationist efforts and to coordinate local political response. This grew into volunteer networks in most states that were coordinated by theCreation/Evolution Newsletter . By 1983, these committees and the Newsletter had been incorporated as the NCSE. In 1987, author and lecturer Eugenie Scott became the NCSE's first Executive Director and first full-time employee.

In the 1990s, based upon its monitoring of creationist efforts, it issued warnings of high levels of official anti-evolutionism and a "sharp surge upwards" in creationist attacks on evolution, including attempts to downgrade evolution from "fact" to "theory" (see evolution as theory and fact) or present the "evidence against evolution" (see objections to evolution).

In 2003, the NCSE gained international attention with Project Steve, a tongue-in-cheek response to the Christian creationist Discovery Institute's publication of A Scientific Dissent from Darwinism. The 2001 "Dissent" statement is signed by more than 100 (over 1,000 as of 2019) scientists, professionals, and degree-holders professing skepticism of the tenants and findings of Darwinian theory. In order to demonstrate the overwhelming scientific consensus in support of Darwinism, Project Steve collected several hundred signatures of active scientists with only the given name or nickname Steve (in honor of then-recently deceased paleontologist Stephen Jay Gould). Project Steve's signatory list rapidly outpaced that of the Discovery Institute's statement, and as of 2025 it has more than 1,500 signatories.

In 2005, the NCSE assisted the plaintiffs in Kitzmiller v. Dover Area School District, the most prominent case testing the constitutionality of intelligent design in public school science classes. The plaintiffs were suing Dover Area School District, a public school district in Pennsylvania, over changes in its biology curriculum to include the creationist textbook Of Pandas and People and requiring teachers to read a statement criticizing evolutionary theory. Nick Matzke, the NCSE's Public Information Project Director at the time, served as liaison to the legal team, and was responsible for uncovering the substitution of "intelligent design" for "creationism" within drafts of Of Pandas and People, which became a devastating part of the testimony of Barbara Forrest (also an NCSE Director), and was cited extensively in Judge John E. Jones III's decision. Kitzmiller v. Dover remains a landmark case in United States constitutional law, and is considered to have effectively ended attempts to introduce intelligent design into public school science curricula. Eric Rothschild, lead counsel for the plaintiffs, is a member of NCSE's Board of Directors as of 2025.

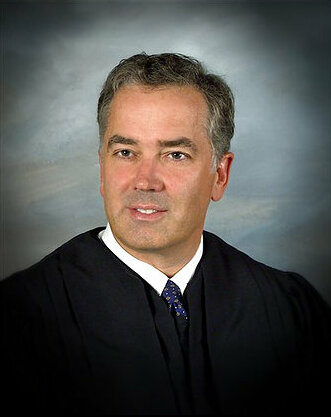
United States District Judge John E. Jones III sided with the plaintiffs and the NCSE in Kitzmiller v. Dover (2005).

In April 2008, the NCSE launched Expelled Exposed, a website critical of the film Expelled: No Intelligence Allowed starring Ben Stein. The website received press attention and a large amount of traffic.

In 2012, the NCSE announced they would be engaged in efforts to keep climate change education, and global warming issues, safe from threats from special interests. They developed a series of lessons addressing climate change misconceptions and offered teacher training through a Teacher Ambassador program. That year, the organization also announced that it had reached 4,500 members who were "scientists, teachers, clergy, and citizens with diverse religious and political affiliations."

Beginning in 2010, the NCSE began a policy shift towards direct educational and material support for teachers in K-12 classrooms. The first "Teacher Ambassadors" were named in 2017, and the program of recognizing teachers dedicated to evolution and climate change education continues to the present. In the early 2020s, the NCSE developed and published a series of lesson sets on the "Nature of Science." These materials are designed to provide students and educators with a fundamental understanding of the nature of scientific inquiry and the ability to distinguish between scientific and pseudoscientific claims.

The COVID-19 pandemic saw efforts by the NCSE to combat misinformation and promote trust in medical research and vaccination.

Amanda L. Townley has been the organization's Executive Director since December 2023. She replaced Ann Reid, who had been appointed to the position in 2013. Previously, Eugenie C. Scott served as executive director for 27 years, from 1986 to 2013.

== Activities and programs ==
The NCSE organizes its mission into three main programs: Science Education and Outreach (SEO), Catalyzing Action (CA), and Investigating Science Education (ISE). SEO covers classroom support and includes the Teacher Ambassador program. ISE is responsible for studying and reporting on the state of science education in the United States. The Catalyzing Action (CA) program has taken over the NCSE's historical purpose of coordinating political response to "efforts to undermine the integrity of science education", which can include local policies up to state and national legislation.

The NCSE maintains up-to-date listings of current events and information regarding creationist and antievolution advocacy, as well as about evolution education. Historian of science Michael Shermer describes its website as being one of "the two best resources on the Internet on the evolution/creation topic" (the other being TalkOrigins Archive). The NCSE also opposes intelligent design and other "alternatives" to evolution because it says they are misleading euphemisms for creationism.

NCSE maintains a policy of religious neutrality and has cooperated with both religious and secular scientific and educational organizations like the National Academy of Sciences, the National Association of Biology Teachers, and the National Science Teachers Association. Its willingness to engage positively with, and avoid taking sides against, religiously minded supporters of evolution has been noted by historian of creationism Ronald L. Numbers and atheist author Richard Dawkins.

== Leadership ==
The NCSE is led by an executive staff and a Board of Directors. The Executive Director is Amanda L. Townley, a science education researcher who was previously an Associate Professor at Georgia Southern University. Other staff members include Deputy Director Glenn Branch.

Kenneth R. Miller, a biologist and prominent critic of the intelligent design movement, is the President of the Board of Directors. Other members of the Board include Prosanta Chakrabarty, Joseph L. Graves Jr., and Eric Rothschild, lead counsel for the plaintiffs in Kitzmiller v. Dover.

== In the media ==
Then-Executive Director Eugenie Scott appeared on the current affairs program Uncommon Knowledge twice in 2001, where she debated creationist William A. Dembski. Scott made an appearance on Penn & Teller: Bullshit! for the 2004 episode "Creationism". Scott offered a scientific perspective on the ID and creationism movements, noting that, "it would be unfair to tell students that there is a serious dispute going on among scientists whether evolution took place. There's not." She further stated:

"a lot of the time the creationists ... they'll search through scientific journals and try to pull out something they think demonstrates evolution doesn't work and there is a kind of interesting rationale behind it. Their theology is such that if one thing is wrong with the Bible you have to throw it all out so that's why Genesis has to be interpreted literally. They look at science the same way. If one little piece of the evolutionary puzzle doesn't fit the whole thing has to go."

In November 2007 Scott discussed the NCSE's exploration of intelligent design on the NOVA documentary Judgment Day: Intelligent Design on Trial, which documents the background and proceedings of Kitzmiller v. Dover.

== See also ==
- Anti-evolution
- Climate change denial
- Creation and evolution in public education in the United States
- Discovery Institute
- Education in the United States
- Environmental groups and resources serving K–12 schools
- Intelligent design movement
- Teach the Controversy
- Wedge strategy
