= Breathless (novel) =

Novel by Dean Koontz

- Author: Dean Koontz
- Language: English
- Genre: Suspense, Thriller
- Publisher: Bantam Publishing
- Publication date: Nov 29, 2009
- Publication place: United States
- Media type: Print (Paperback)
- Pages: 352 pp
- ISBN: 978-0-553-80715-8

Breathless is a 2009 novel by American author Dean Koontz. It was published by Bantam Books on November 24, 2009.

== Reception ==
Francis Moul of the Lincoln Journal Star described the plot as "imaginative" and praised the "new and beautiful word pictures of woods, sunsets and the rest of the natural settings" that Koontz portrayed in the book and as in his other works.
