= Paul Nelson (creationist) =

American creationist (born 1958)

Paul A. Nelson (born 1958) is an American philosopher of science noted for his advocacy of the pseudosciences of young Earth creationism and intelligent design.

== Biography ==
Nelson is the grandson of the creationist author and Lutheran minister Byron Christopher Nelson (1894–1972) and edited a book of his grandfather's writings. He is married to Suzanne Nelson, an assistant professor of pediatrics at Northwestern University.

Nelson graduated from the University of Pittsburgh with a B.A. in philosophy with a minor in evolutionary theory. He then earned a Ph.D. in philosophy from the University of Chicago in 1998.

Nelson is a fellow of the Discovery Institute's Center for Science and Culture and of the International Society for Complexity, Information and Design.

== Controversies ==
The Discovery Institute's Wedge Document, and other sources have said that Nelson publishes works derived from his dissertation, "Common Descent, Generative Entrenchment, and the Epistemology in Evolutionary Inference", in which he criticizes the principle of common descent as it is expounded in the Evolutionary Monographs series.

Nelson is frequently cited by opponents of intelligent design as an example of ID's "big tent" strategy in action. He has written about "Life in the Big Tent" in the Christian Research Journal. In an interview for Touchstone Magazine Nelson said that the main challenge facing the ID community was to "develop a full-fledged theory of biological design", and that the lack of such a theory was a "real problem".

As shown in the Peabody Award-winning documentary Nova: Intelligent Design on Trial, in the Kitzmiller v. Dover trial, Barbara Forrest presented a quote from Nelson to demonstrate that Intelligent Design proponents know that it is not a theory in the scientific sense:

Easily, the biggest challenge facing the I.D. community is to develop a full-fledged theory of biological design. We don't have such a theory right now, and that's a real problem. Without a theory, it's very hard to know where to direct your research focus. Right now, we've got a bag of powerful intuitions and a handful of notions, such as irreducible complexity, but as yet, no general theory of biological design.

== Young Earth views ==
Nelson was a contributor to the book Three Views on Creation and Evolution, edited by J. P. Moreland and John Mark Reynolds, in which he, along with Reynolds, represented the young Earth creationist position. In their discussion in that book he and Reynolds acknowledged that "natural science at the moment seems to overwhelmingly point to an old cosmos." Ideas consistent with present-day Young Earth creationism were abandoned around the start of the 19th century. Today, such proposals are rejected by the scientific community, and the courts have ruled Young Earth creationism to be a religious belief.

In a discussion with historian of science Ronald Numbers, Nelson made a distinction between his theological understanding of Earth history, which is informed by the biblical account as presented in the book of Genesis, and his advocacy for intelligent design. Nelson acknowledged that his young-Earth views are unpopular with many other intelligent design advocates.

Nelson was a cast member in the 2017 creationist documentary film Is Genesis History?. After the film's release, he published an article stating that the film distorted his arguments and presented "a false dichotomy" between naturalistic evolution and young Earth creationism while omitting other viewpoints. Director and Producer Thomas Purifoy wrote a response entitled A Tale of Two Dichotomies in which he presented the full film interview with Nelson as evidence and stated that "as a philosopher, Paul seemed to be shifting back to viewing things from a philosophical perspective. The film, however, was not about comparing two different philosophies, but two different histories."
