= Piotr Lenartowicz =

Polish philosopher (1934–2012)

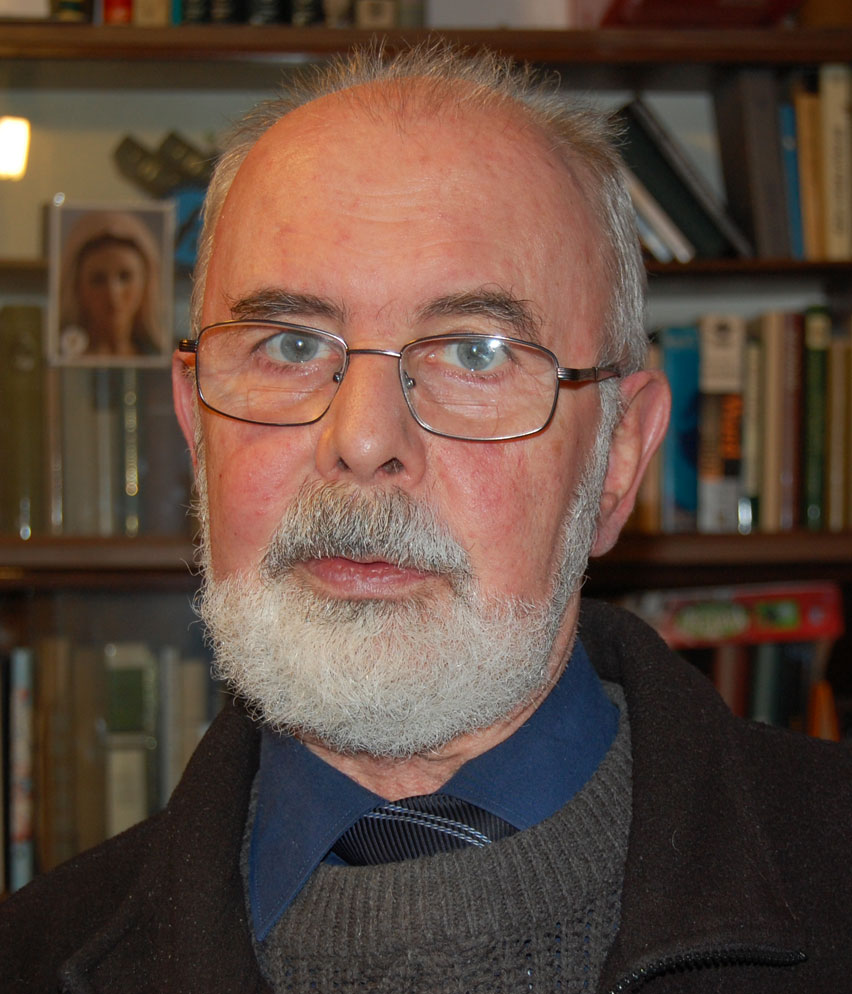
Piotr Lenartowicz

Piotr Lenartowicz (25 August 1934 – 10 October 2012) was a Polish philosopher, vitalist, professor of philosophy at the Jesuit University of Philosophy and Education Ignatianum, jesuit.

== Life ==
Lenartowicz was born in Warsaw, Poland, the son of Wiesław Lenartowicz and Krystyna Schneider. He completed his medical studies at School of Medicine in Warsaw in 1958. In 1961 he obtained a doctorate in neurophysiology at the School of Medicine in Warsaw. Studied philosophy (Lic. in philosophy (Jesuit Faculty of Philosophy, Cracow, 1965) and theology Lic. in theology (Jesuit Faculty of Theology, Warsaw, 1970). He studied philosophy in Rome, at the Philosophical Faculty of Pontifical Gregorian University, and received a doctorate in developmental biology in 1975. He received another degree (doctor habilitowany) at the Philosophical Faculty of Pontifical Academy of Theology, Cracow, working on theory of biological phenomena, in 1986. In 1999 he became a full professor. Lenartowicz participated in seminars in Castel Gandolfo invited by Pope John Paul II. He was a member of the Jesuit University of Philosophy and Education Ignatianum and at one time was vice president of that institution.

== Work ==
His main interests revolve around philosophy of biology including integration of biological phenomena, theory of the genetic program, aristotelian theory of biological substance, cognitive aspects of biological dynamisms, problems of biological observation, experimentation and concept formation, and reconstruction of fossil hominids.

Lenartowicz wrote about the principles of irreducible complexity before the hypothesis gained ground after the publication of Michael Behe's Darwin's Black Box. In his dissertation Phenotype-Genotype Dichotomy published in 1975, he described irreducibility of certain biological phenomena.

== Publications ==
- Lenartowicz, P. (1975) Phenotype-Genotype Dichotomy (in English). Pontif. Univ.Gregoriana, Roma, 1975.
- Lenartowicz, P. Philosophy of Biological Phenomena (in Polish), WAM, Cracow, 1985.
- Lenartowicz, P. Theory of cognition (Polish text), Jesuit Philosophical Faculty, Cracow, 1995.
- Lenartowicz Piotr, Koszteyn Jolanta, Introduction to philosophical questions (in Polish), Jesuit University of Philosophy and Education Ignatianum - WAM, Cracow, ISBN 83-88209-04-3, 2000.
- Vivere & Intelligere. Selected papers by Piotr Lenartowicz SJ published on his 75th birthday. Jesuit University of Philosophy and Education Ignatianum - WAM, Cracow, 2009.
- Lenartowicz, P. People or Manapes. Problem of Human Genealogy (in Polish; Summary in English), Jesuit University of Philosophy and Education Ignatianum, Cracow, 2010.
- Lenartowicz, P. Theory of cognition (new edition, in Polish), WAM, Ignatianum, Cracow, 2014.
- The complete list of publications Dzieła Piotra Lenartowicza
