= Irreducible complexity =

Argument by proponents of intelligent design

Irreducible complexity (IC) is the argument that certain biological systems with multiple interacting parts would not function if one of the parts were removed, so supposedly could not have evolved by successive small modifications from earlier less complex systems through natural selection, which would need all intermediate precursor systems to have been fully functional. This negative argument is then complemented by the claim that the only alternative explanation is a "purposeful arrangement of parts" inferring design by an intelligent agent. Irreducible complexity has become central to the creationist concept of intelligent design (ID), but the concept of irreducible complexity has been rejected by the scientific community at large, which regards intelligent design as pseudoscience. Irreducible complexity and specified complexity are the two main arguments used by intelligent-design proponents to support their version of the theological argument from design.

The central concept that complex biological systems which require all their parts to function could not evolve by the incremental changes of natural selection, and so must have been produced by an intelligence, was already featured in creation science. The 1989 school textbook Of Pandas and People introduced the alternative terminology of intelligent design, a revised section in the 1993 edition of the textbook argued that a blood-clotting system demonstrated this concept.

This section was written by Michael Behe, a professor of biochemistry at Lehigh University. He subsequently introduced the expression irreducible complexity along with a full account of his arguments, in his 1996 book Darwin's Black Box, and said it made evolution through natural selection of random mutations impossible, or extremely improbable. This was based on the mistaken assumption that evolution relies on improvement of existing functions, ignoring how complex adaptations originate from changes in function, and disregarding published research. Evolutionary biologists have published rebuttals showing how systems discussed by Behe can evolve.

In the 2005 Kitzmiller v. Dover Area School District trial, Behe gave testimony on the subject of irreducible complexity. The court found that "Professor Behe's claim for irreducible complexity has been refuted in peer-reviewed research papers and has been rejected by the scientific community at large."

== Definitions ==
Michael Behe defined irreducible complexity in natural selection in terms of well-matched parts in his 1996 book Darwin's Black Box:

... a single system composed of several well-matched, interacting parts that contribute to the basic function, wherein the removal of any one of the parts causes the system to effectively cease functioning.

A second definition given by Behe in 2000 (his "evolutionary definition") states:

An irreducibly complex evolutionary pathway is one that contains one or more unselected steps (that is, one or more necessary-but-unselected mutations). The degree of irreducible complexity is the number of unselected steps in the pathway.

Intelligent-design advocate William A. Dembski assumed an "original function" in his 2002 definition:

A system performing a given basic function is irreducibly complex if it includes a set of well-matched, mutually interacting, nonarbitrarily individuated parts such that each part in the set is indispensable to maintaining the system's basic, and therefore original, function. The set of these indispensable parts is known as the irreducible core of the system.

== History ==
=== Forerunners ===
The argument from irreducible complexity is a descendant of the teleological argument for God (the argument from design or from complexity). This states that complex functionality in the natural world which looks designed is evidence of an intelligent creator. William Paley famously argued, in his 1802 watchmaker analogy, that complexity in nature implies a God for the same reason that the existence of a watch implies the existence of a watchmaker. This argument has a long history, and one can trace it back at least as far as Cicero's De Natura Deorum ii.34, written in 45 BC.

==== Up to the 18th century ====
Galen (1st and 2nd centuries AD) wrote about the large number of parts of the body and their relationships, which observation was cited as evidence for creation. The idea that the interdependence between parts would have implications for the origins of living things was raised by writers starting with Pierre Gassendi in the mid-17th century and by John Wilkins (1614–1672), who wrote (citing Galen), "Now to imagine, that all these things, according to their several kinds, could be brought into this regular frame and order, to which such an infinite number of Intentions are required, without the contrivance of some wise Agent, must needs be irrational in the highest degree." In the late 17th-century, Thomas Burnet referred to "a multitude of pieces aptly joyn'd" to argue against the eternity of life. In the early 18th century, Nicolas Malebranche wrote "An organized body contains an infinity of parts that mutually depend upon one another in relation to particular ends, all of which must be actually formed in order to work as a whole", arguing in favor of preformation, rather than epigenesis, of the individual; and a similar argument about the origins of the individual was made by other 18th-century students of natural history. In his 1790 book, The Critique of Judgment, Kant is said by Guyer to argue that "we cannot conceive how a whole that comes into being only gradually from its parts can nevertheless be the cause of the properties of those parts".

==== 19th century ====
Chapter XV of Paley's Natural Theology discusses at length what he called "relations" of parts of living things as an indication of their design.

Georges Cuvier applied his principle of the correlation of parts to describe an animal from fragmentary remains. For Cuvier, this related to another principle of his, the conditions of existence, which excluded the possibility of transmutation of species.

While he did not originate the term, Charles Darwin identified the argument as a possible way to falsify a prediction of the theory of evolution at the outset. In The Origin of Species (1859), he wrote, "If it could be demonstrated that any complex organ existed, which could not possibly have been formed by numerous, successive, slight modifications, my theory would absolutely break down. But I can find out no such case." Darwin's theory of evolution challenges the teleological argument by postulating an alternative explanation to that of an intelligent designer—namely, evolution by natural selection. By showing how simple unintelligent forces can ratchet up designs of extraordinary complexity without invoking outside design, Darwin showed that an intelligent designer was not the necessary conclusion to draw from complexity in nature. The argument from irreducible complexity attempts to demonstrate that certain biological features cannot be purely the product of Darwinian evolution.

In the late 19th century, in a dispute between supporters of the adequacy of natural selection and those who held for inheritance of acquired characteristics, one of the arguments made repeatedly by Herbert Spencer, and followed by others, depended on what Spencer referred to as co-adaptation of co-operative parts, as in:

"We come now to Professor Weismann's endeavour to disprove my second thesis—that it is impossible to explain by natural selection alone the co-adaptation of co-operative parts. It is thirty years since this was set forth in 'The Principles of Biology.' In § 166, I instanced the enormous horns of the extinct Irish elk, and contended that in this and in kindred cases, where for the efficient use of some one enlarged part many other parts have to be simultaneously enlarged, it is out of the question to suppose that they can have all spontaneously varied in the required proportions."

Darwin responded to Spencer's objections in chapter XXV of The Variation of Animals and Plants Under Domestication (1868). The history of this concept in the dispute has been characterized: "An older and more religious tradition of idealist thinkers were committed to the explanation of complex adaptive contrivances by intelligent design. ... Another line of thinkers, unified by the recurrent publications of Herbert Spencer, also saw co-adaptation as a composed, irreducible whole, but sought to explain it by the inheritance of acquired characteristics."

St. George Jackson Mivart raised the objection to natural selection that "Complex and simultaneous co-ordinations ... until so far developed as to effect the requisite junctions, are useless". In the 2012 book Evolution and Belief, Confessions of a Religious Paleontologist, Robert J. Asher said this "amounts to the concept of 'irreducible complexity' as defined by ... Michael Behe".

==== 20th century ====
Hermann Muller, in the early 20th century, discussed a concept similar to irreducible complexity. However, far from seeing this as a problem for evolution, he described the "interlocking" of biological features as a consequence to be expected of evolution, which would lead to irreversibility of some evolutionary changes. He wrote, "Being thus finally woven, as it were, into the most intimate fabric of the organism, the once novel character can no longer be withdrawn with impunity, and may have become vitally necessary."

In 1975 Thomas H. Frazzetta published a book-length study of a concept similar to irreducible complexity, explained by gradual, step-wise, non-teleological evolution. Frazzetta wrote:

"A complex adaptation is one constructed of several components that must blend together operationally to make the adaptation 'work'. It is analogous to a machine whose performance depends upon careful cooperation among its parts. In the case of the machine, no single part can greatly be altered without changing the performance of the entire machine."

The machine that he chose as an analog is the Peaucellier–Lipkin linkage, and one biological system given extended description was the jaw apparatus of a python. The conclusion of this investigation, rather than that evolution of a complex adaptation was impossible, "awed by the adaptations of living things, to be stunned by their complexity and suitability", was "to accept the inescapable but not humiliating fact that much of mankind can be seen in a tree or a lizard."

In 1985 Cairns-Smith wrote of "interlocking": "How can a complex collaboration between components evolve in small steps?" and used the analogy of the scaffolding called centering—used to build an arch then removed afterwards: "Surely there was 'scaffolding'. Before the multitudinous components of present biochemistry could come to lean together they had to lean on something else." However, neither Muller or Cairns-Smith claimed their ideas as evidence of something supernatural.

An early concept of irreducibly complex systems comes from Ludwig von Bertalanffy (1901–1972), an Austrian biologist. He believed that complex systems must be examined as complete, irreducible systems in order to fully understand how they work. He extended his work on biological complexity into a general theory of systems in a book titled General Systems Theory.

After James Watson and Francis Crick published the structure of DNA in the early 1950s, General Systems Theory lost many of its adherents in the physical and biological sciences. However, systems theory remained popular in the social sciences long after its demise in the physical and biological sciences.

=== Creationism ===
Versions of the irreducible complexity argument have been common in young Earth creationist (YEC) creation science journals. For example, in the July 1965 issue of Creation Research Society Quarterly Harold W. Clark described the complex interaction in which yucca moths have an "inherited action pattern" or instinct to fertilize plants: "Before the pattern can be inherited, it must be formed. But how could yucca plants mature seeds while waiting for the moths to learn the process and set the pattern? The whole procedure points so strongly to intelligent design that it is difficult to escape the conclusion that the hand of a wise and beneficent Creator has been involved." Similarly, honeybees pollinate apple blossom: "Again we may well ask how such an arrangement could have come about by accident, or how either the flowers or the bees could have survived alone. Intelligent design is again evident."

In 1974 the YEC Henry M. Morris introduced an irreducible complexity concept in his creation science book Scientific Creationism, in which he wrote; "The creationist maintains that the degree of complexity and order which science has discovered in the universe could never be generated by chance or accident." He continued; "This issue can actually be attacked quantitatively, using simple principles of mathematical probability. The problem is simply whether a complex system, in which many components function unitedly together, and in which each component is uniquely necessary to the efficient functioning of the whole, could ever arise by random processes." In 1975 Duane Gish wrote in The Amazing Story of Creation from Science and the Bible; "The creationist maintains that the degree of complexity and order which science has discovered in the universe could never be generated by chance or accident."

A 1980 article in the creation science magazine Creation by the YEC Ariel A. Roth said "Creation and various other views can be supported by the scientific data that reveal that the spontaneous origin of the complex integrated biochemical systems of even the simplest organisms is, at best, a most improbable event". In 1981, defending the creation science position in the trial McLean v. Arkansas, Roth said of "complex integrated structures": "This system would not be functional until all the parts were there ... How did these parts survive during evolution ...?"

In 1985, countering the creationist claims that all the changes would be needed at once, Cairns-Smith wrote of "interlocking": "How can a complex collaboration between components evolve in small steps?" and used the analogy of the scaffolding called centering—used to build an arch then removed afterwards: "Surely there was 'scaffolding'. Before the multitudinous components of present biochemistry could come to lean together they had to lean on something else." Neither Muller or Cairns-Smith said their ideas were evidence of anything supernatural.

The bacterial flagellum featured in creation science literature. Morris later claimed that one of their Institute for Creation Research "scientists (the late Dr. Dick Bliss) was using this example in his talks on creation a generation ago". In December 1992 the creation science magazine Creation called bacterial flagella "rotary engines", and dismissed the possibility that these "incredibly complicated arrangements of matter" could have "evolved by selection of chance mutations. The alternative explanation, that they were created, is much more reasonable." An article in the Creation Research Society Magazine for June 1994 called a flagellum a "bacterial nanomachine", forming the "bacterial rotor-flagellar complex" where "it is clear from the details of their operation that nothing about them works unless every one of their complexly fashioned and integrated components are in place", hard to explain by natural selection. The abstract said that in "terms of biophysical complexity, the bacterial rotor-flagellum is without precedent in the living world. ... To evolutionists, the system presents an enigma; to creationists, if offers clear and compelling evidence of purposeful intelligent design."

=== Intelligent design ===
The biology supplementary textbook for schools Of Pandas and People was drafted presenting creation science arguments, but shortly after the Edwards v. Aguillard ruling, that it was unconstitutional to teach creationism in public school science classes, the authors changed the wording to "intelligent design", introducing the new meaning of this term when the book was published in 1989. In a separate response to the same ruling, law professor Phillip E. Johnson wrote Darwin on Trial, published in 1991, and at a conference in March 1992 brought together key figures in what he later called the 'wedge movement', including biochemistry professor Michael Behe. According to Johnson, around 1992 Behe developed his ideas of what he later called his "irreducible complexity" concept, and first presented these ideas in June 1993 when the "Johnson-Behe cadre of scholars" met at Pajaro Dunes in California.

The second edition of Of Pandas and People, published in 1993, had extensive revisions to Chapter 6 Biochemical Similarities with new sections on the complex mechanism of blood clotting and on the origin of proteins, written by Behe though he was not initially acknowledged as their author. He argued that "all of the proteins had to be present simultaneously for the blood clotting system to function", so it could not have evolved. In later publications, he named the argument "irreducibly complexity", but changed his definition of this specific system. In Doubts About Darwin: A History of Intelligent Design (2003), historian Thomas Woodward wrote that "Michael Behe assisted in the rewriting of a chapter on biochemistry in a revised edition of Pandas. The book stands as one of the milestones in the infancy of Design."

On Access Research Network, Behe posted (on 3 February 1999) "Molecular Machines: Experimental Support for the Design Inference" with a note that "This paper was originally presented in the Summer of 1994 at the meeting of the C. S. Lewis Society, Cambridge University." An "Irreducible Complexity" section quoted Darwin, then discussed "the humble mousetrap", and "Molecular Machines", going into detail about cilia before saying "Other examples of irreducible complexity abound, including aspects of protein transport, blood clotting, closed circular DNA, electron transport, the bacterial flagellum, telomeres, photosynthesis, transcription regulation, and much more. Examples of irreducible complexity can be found on virtually every page of a biochemistry textbook." Suggesting "these things cannot be explained by Darwinian evolution," he said they had been neglected by the scientific community.

Behe first published the term "irreducible complexity" in his 1996 book Darwin's Black Box, where he set out his ideas about theoretical properties of some complex biochemical cellular systems, now including the bacterial flagellum. He posits that evolutionary mechanisms cannot explain the development of such "irreducibly complex" systems. Notably, Behe credits philosopher William Paley for the original concept (alone among the predecessors).

Intelligent design advocates argue that irreducibly complex systems must have been deliberately engineered by some form of intelligence.

In 2001, Behe wrote: "[T]here is an asymmetry between my current definition of irreducible complexity and the task facing natural selection. I hope to repair this defect in future work." Behe specifically explained that the "current definition puts the focus on removing a part from an already functioning system", but the "difficult task facing Darwinian evolution, however, would not be to remove parts from sophisticated pre-existing systems; it would be to bring together components to make a new system in the first place". In the 2005 Kitzmiller v. Dover Area School District trial, Behe testified under oath that he "did not judge [the asymmetry] serious enough to [have revised the book] yet."

Behe additionally testified that the presence of irreducible complexity in organisms would not rule out the involvement of evolutionary mechanisms in the development of organic life. He further testified that he knew of no earlier "peer reviewed articles in scientific journals discussing the intelligent design of the blood clotting cascade," but that there were "probably a large number of peer reviewed articles in science journals that demonstrate that the blood clotting system is indeed a purposeful arrangement of parts of great complexity and sophistication." (The judge ruled that "intelligent design is not science and is essentially religious in nature".)

The scientific theory of evolution incorporates evidence that genetic variations occur, but makes no assumptions of purposeful design or intent. The environment "selects" the variants which have the highest fitness for conditions at the time, and these heritable variations are then passed on to the next generation of organisms. Change occurs by the gradual operation of natural forces over time, perhaps slowly, perhaps more quickly (see punctuated equilibrium). This process is able to adapt complex structures from simpler beginnings, or convert complex structures from one function to another (see spandrel). Most intelligent design advocates accept that evolution occurs through mutation and natural selection at the "micro level", such as changing the relative frequency of various beak lengths in finches, but assert that it cannot account for irreducible complexity, because none of the parts of an irreducible system would be functional or advantageous until the entire system is in place.

=== The mousetrap example ===
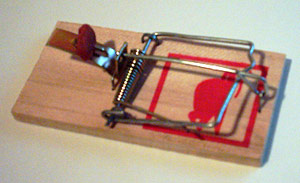
Michael Behe believes that many aspects of life show evidence of design, using the mousetrap in an analogy disputed by others.

Behe uses the mousetrap as an illustrative example of this concept. A mousetrap consists of five interacting pieces: the base, the catch, the spring, the hammer, and the hold-down bar. All of these must be in place for the mousetrap to work, as the removal of any one piece destroys the function of the mousetrap. Likewise, he asserts that biological systems require multiple parts working together in order to function. Intelligent design advocates claim that natural selection could not create from scratch those systems for which science is currently unable to find a viable evolutionary pathway of successive, slight modifications, because the selectable function is only present when all parts are assembled.

In his 2008 book Only A Theory, biologist Kenneth R. Miller challenges Behe's claim that the mousetrap is irreducibly complex. Miller observes that various subsets of the five components can be devised to form cooperative units, ones that have different functions from the mousetrap and so, in biological terms, could form functional spandrels before being adapted to the new function of catching mice. In an example taken from his high school experience, Miller recalls that one of his classmates

...struck upon the brilliant idea of using an old, broken mousetrap as a spitball catapult, and it worked brilliantly.... It had worked perfectly as something other than a mousetrap.... my rowdy friend had pulled a couple of parts—probably the hold-down bar and catch—off the trap to make it easier to conceal and more effective as a catapult... [leaving] the base, the spring, and the hammer. Not much of a mousetrap, but a helluva spitball launcher.... I realized why [Behe's] mousetrap analogy had bothered me. It was wrong. The mousetrap is not irreducibly complex after all.

Other systems identified by Miller that include mousetrap components include the following:

- use the spitball launcher as a tie clip (same three-part system with different function)
- remove the spring from the spitball launcher/tie clip to create a two-part key chain (base + hammer)
- glue the spitball launcher/tie clip to a sheet of wood to create a clipboard (launcher + glue + wood)
- remove the hold-down bar for use as a toothpick (single element system)

The point of the reduction is that—in biology—most or all of the components were already at hand, by the time it became necessary to build a mousetrap. As such, it required far fewer steps to develop a mousetrap than to design all the components from scratch.

Thus, the development of the mousetrap, said to consist of five different parts which had no function on their own, has been reduced to one step: the assembly from parts that are already present, performing other functions.

=== Consequences ===
Supporters of intelligent design argue that anything less than the complete form of such a system or organ would not work at all, or would in fact be a detriment to the organism, and would therefore never survive the process of natural selection. Although they accept that some complex systems and organs can be explained by evolution, they claim that organs and biological features which are irreducibly complex cannot be explained by current models, and that an intelligent designer must have created life or guided its evolution. Accordingly, the debate on irreducible complexity concerns two questions: whether irreducible complexity can be found in nature, and what significance it would have if it did exist in nature.

Behe's original examples of irreducibly complex mechanisms included the bacterial flagellum of E. coli, the blood clotting cascade, cilia, and the adaptive immune system.

Behe argues that organs and biological features which are irreducibly complex cannot be wholly explained by current models of evolution. In explicating his definition of "irreducible complexity" he notes that:

An irreducibly complex system cannot be produced directly (that is, by continuously improving the initial function, which continues to work by the same mechanism) by slight, successive modifications of a precursor system, because any precursor to an irreducibly complex system that is missing a part is by definition nonfunctional.

Irreducible complexity is not an argument that evolution does not occur, but rather an argument that it is "incomplete". In the last chapter of Darwin's Black Box, Behe goes on to explain his view that irreducible complexity is evidence for intelligent design. Mainstream critics, however, argue that irreducible complexity, as defined by Behe, can be generated by known evolutionary mechanisms. Behe's claim that no scientific literature adequately modeled the origins of biochemical systems through evolutionary mechanisms has been challenged by TalkOrigins. The judge in the Dover trial wrote "By defining irreducible complexity in the way that he has, Professor Behe attempts to exclude the phenomenon of exaptation by definitional fiat, ignoring as he does so abundant evidence which refutes his argument. Notably, the NAS has rejected Professor Behe's claim for irreducible complexity..."

== Claimed examples ==
Behe and others have suggested a number of biological features that they believed to be irreducibly complex.

=== Blood clotting cascade ===
The process of blood clotting or coagulation cascade in vertebrates is a complex biological pathway which is given as an example of apparent irreducible complexity.

The irreducible complexity argument assumes that the necessary parts of a system have always been necessary, and therefore could not have been added sequentially. However, in evolution, something which is at first merely advantageous can later become necessary. Natural selection can lead to complex biochemical systems being built up from simpler systems, or to existing functional systems being recombined as a new system with a different function. For example, one of the clotting factors that Behe listed as a part of the clotting cascade (Factor XII, also called Hageman factor) was later found to be absent in whales, demonstrating that it is not essential for a clotting system. Many purportedly irreducible structures can be found in other organisms as much simpler systems that utilize fewer parts. These systems, in turn, may have had even simpler precursors that are now extinct. Behe has responded to critics of his clotting cascade arguments by suggesting that homology is evidence for evolution, but not for natural selection.

The "improbability argument" also misrepresents natural selection. It is correct to say that a set of simultaneous mutations that form a complex protein structure is so unlikely as to be unfeasible, but that is not what Darwin advocated. His explanation is based on small accumulated changes that take place without a final goal. Each step must be advantageous in its own right, although biologists may not yet understand the reason behind all of them—for example, jawless fish accomplish blood clotting with just six proteins instead of the full ten.

=== Eye ===
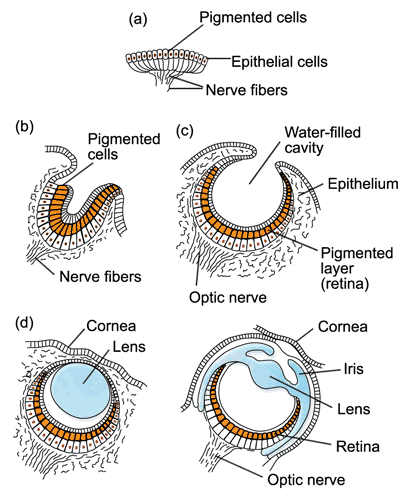
Stages in the evolution of the eye (a) A pigment spot (b) A simple pigment cup (c) The simple optic cup found in abalone (d) The complex lensed eye of the marine snail and the octopus

The eye is frequently cited by intelligent design and creationism advocates as a purported example of irreducible complexity. Behe used the "development of the eye problem" as evidence for intelligent design in Darwin's Black Box. Although Behe acknowledged that the evolution of the larger anatomical features of the eye have been well-explained, he pointed out that the complexity of the minute biochemical reactions required at a molecular level for light sensitivity still defies explanation. Creationist Jonathan Sarfati has described the eye as evolutionary biologists' "greatest challenge as an example of superb 'irreducible complexity' in God's creation", specifically pointing to the supposed "vast complexity" required for transparency.

In an often misquoted passage from On the Origin of Species, Charles Darwin appears to acknowledge the eye's development as a difficulty for his theory. However, the quote in context shows that Darwin actually had a very good understanding of the evolution of the eye (see fallacy of quoting out of context). He notes that "to suppose that the eye ... could have been formed by natural selection, seems, I freely confess, absurd in the highest possible degree". Yet this observation was merely a rhetorical device for Darwin. He goes on to explain that if gradual evolution of the eye could be shown to be possible, "the difficulty of believing that a perfect and complex eye could be formed by natural selection ... can hardly be considered real". He then proceeded to roughly map out a likely course for evolution using examples of gradually more complex eyes of various species.

The eyes of vertebrates (left) and invertebrates such as the octopus (right) developed independently: vertebrates evolved an inverted retina with a blind spot over their optic disc, whereas octopuses avoided this with a non-inverted retina. (1 photo-receptors, 2 neural tissue, 3 optic nerve, 4 blind spot)

Since Darwin's day, the eye's ancestry has become much better understood. Although learning about the construction of ancient eyes through fossil evidence is problematic due to the soft tissues leaving no imprint or remains, genetic and comparative anatomical evidence has increasingly supported the idea of a common ancestry for all eyes.

Current evidence does suggest possible evolutionary lineages for the origins of the anatomical features of the eye. One likely chain of development is that the eyes originated as simple patches of photoreceptor cells that could detect the presence or absence of light, but not its direction. When, via random mutation across the population, the photosensitive cells happened to have developed on a small depression, it endowed the organism with a better sense of the light's source. This small change gave the organism an advantage over those without the mutation. This genetic trait would then be "selected for" as those with the trait would have an increased chance of survival, and therefore progeny, over those without the trait. Individuals with deeper depressions would be able to discern changes in light over a wider field than those individuals with shallower depressions. As ever deeper depressions were advantageous to the organism, gradually, this depression would become a pit into which light would strike certain cells depending on its angle. The organism slowly gained increasingly precise visual information. And again, this gradual process continued as individuals having a slightly shrunken aperture of the eye had an advantage over those without the mutation as an aperture increases how collimated the light is at any one specific group of photoreceptors. As this trait developed, the eye became effectively a pinhole camera which allowed the organism to dimly make out shapes—the nautilus is a modern example of an animal with such an eye. Finally, via this same selection process, a protective layer of transparent cells over the aperture was differentiated into a crude lens, and the interior of the eye was filled with humours to assist in focusing images. In this way, eyes are recognized by modern biologists as actually a relatively unambiguous and simple structure to evolve, and many of the major developments of the eye's evolution are believed to have taken place over only a few million years, during the Cambrian explosion. Behe asserts that this is only an explanation of the gross anatomical steps, however, and not an explanation of the changes in discrete biochemical systems that would have needed to take place.

Behe maintains that the complexity of light sensitivity at the molecular level and the minute biochemical reactions required for those first "simple patches of photoreceptor[s]" still defies explanation, and that the proposed series of infinitesimal steps to get from patches of photoreceptors to a fully functional eye would actually be considered great, complex leaps in evolution if viewed on the molecular scale. Other intelligent design proponents claim that the evolution of the entire visual system would be difficult rather than the eye alone.

=== Flagella ===
The flagella of certain bacteria constitute a molecular motor requiring the interaction of about 40 different protein parts. Behe presents this as a prime example of an irreducibly complex structure defined as "a single system composed of several well-matched, interacting parts that contribute to the basic function, wherein the removal of any one of the parts causes the system to effectively cease functioning", and argues that since "an irreducibly complex system that is missing a part is by definition nonfunctional", it could not have evolved gradually through natural selection.

Reducible complexity. In contrast to Behe's claims, many proteins can be deleted or mutated and the flagellum still works, even though sometimes at reduced efficiency. In fact, the composition of flagella is surprisingly diverse across bacteria with many proteins only found in some species but not others. Hence the flagellar apparatus is clearly very flexible in evolutionary terms and perfectly able to lose or gain protein components. Further studies have shown that, contrary to claims of "irreducible complexity", flagella and the type-III secretion system share several components which provides strong evidence of a shared evolutionary history (see below). In fact, this example shows how a complex system can evolve from simpler components. Multiple processes were involved in the evolution of the flagellum, including horizontal gene transfer.

Evolution from type three secretion systems. The basal body of the flagella has been found to be similar to the Type III secretion system (TTSS), a needle-like structure that pathogenic germs such as Salmonella and Yersinia pestis use to inject toxins into living eukaryote cells. The needle's base has ten elements in common with the flagellum, but it is missing forty of the proteins that make a flagellum work. The TTSS system negates Behe's claim that taking away any one of the flagellum's parts would prevent the system from functioning. On this basis, Kenneth Miller notes that, "The parts of this supposedly irreducibly complex system actually have functions of their own." Studies have also shown that similar parts of the flagellum in different bacterial species can have different functions despite showing evidence of common descent, and that certain parts of the flagellum can be removed without eliminating its functionality. Behe responded to Miller by asking "why doesn't he just take an appropriate bacterial species, knock out the genes for its flagellum, place the bacterium under selective pressure (for mobility, say), and experimentally produce a flagellum—or any equally complex system—in the laboratory?" However a laboratory experiment has been performed where "immotile strains of the bacterium Pseudomonas fluorescens that lack flagella [...] regained flagella within 96 hours via a two-step evolutionary pathway", concluding that "natural selection can rapidly rewire regulatory networks in very few, repeatable mutational steps".

Dembski has argued that phylogenetically, the TTSS is found in a narrow range of bacteria which makes it seem to him to be a late innovation, whereas flagella are widespread throughout many bacterial groups, and he argues that it was an early innovation. Against Dembski's argument, different flagella use completely different mechanisms, and publications show a plausible path in which bacterial flagella could have evolved from a secretion system.

=== Cilium motion ===
The cilium construction of axoneme microtubules movement by the sliding of dynein protein was cited by Behe as an example of irreducible complexity. He further said that the advances in knowledge in the subsequent 10 years had shown that the complexity of intraflagellar transport for two hundred components cilium and many other cellular structures is substantially greater than was known earlier.

== Response of the scientific community ==
Like intelligent design, the concept it seeks to support, irreducible complexity has failed to gain any notable acceptance within the scientific community.

=== Reducibility of "irreducible" systems ===
Researchers have proposed potentially viable evolutionary pathways for allegedly irreducibly complex systems such as blood clotting, the immune system and the flagellum—the three examples Behe proposed. John H. McDonald even showed his example of a mousetrap to be reducible. If irreducible complexity is an insurmountable obstacle to evolution, it should not be possible to conceive of such pathways.

Niall Shanks and Karl H. Joplin, both of East Tennessee State University, have shown that systems satisfying Behe's characterization of irreducible biochemical complexity can arise naturally and spontaneously as the result of self-organizing chemical processes. They also assert that what evolved biochemical and molecular systems actually exhibit is "redundant complexity"—a kind of complexity that is the product of an evolved biochemical process. They claim that Behe overestimated the significance of irreducible complexity because of his simple, linear view of biochemical reactions, resulting in his taking snapshots of selective features of biological systems, structures, and processes, while ignoring the redundant complexity of the context in which those features are naturally embedded. They also criticized his over-reliance on overly simplistic metaphors, such as his mousetrap.

A computer model of the co-evolution of proteins binding to DNA in the peer-reviewed journal Nucleic Acids Research consisted of several parts (DNA binders and DNA binding sites) which contribute to the basic function; removal of either one leads immediately to the death of the organism. This model fits the definition of irreducible complexity exactly, yet it evolves. (The program can be run from Ev program.)

One can compare a mousetrap with a cat in this context. Both normally function so as to control the mouse population. The cat has many parts that can be removed leaving it still functional; for example, its tail can be bobbed, or it can lose an ear in a fight. Comparing the cat and the mousetrap, then, one sees that the mousetrap (which is not alive) offers better evidence, in terms of irreducible complexity, for intelligent design than the cat. Even looking at the mousetrap analogy, several critics have described ways in which the parts of the mousetrap could have independent uses or could develop in stages, demonstrating that it is not irreducibly complex.

Moreover, even cases where removing a certain component in an organic system will cause the system to fail do not demonstrate that the system could not have been formed in a step-by-step, evolutionary process. By analogy, stone arches are irreducibly complex—if you remove any stone the arch will collapse—yet humans build them easily enough, one stone at a time, by building over centering that is removed afterward. Similarly, naturally occurring arches of stone form by the weathering away of bits of stone from a large concretion that has formed previously.

Evolution can act to simplify as well as to complicate. This raises the possibility that seemingly irreducibly complex biological features may have been achieved with a period of increasing complexity, followed by a period of simplification.

A team led by Joseph Thornton, assistant professor of biology at the University of Oregon's Center for Ecology and Evolutionary Biology, using techniques for resurrecting ancient genes, reconstructed the evolution of an apparently irreducibly complex molecular system. The April 7, 2006 issue of Science published this research.

Irreducible complexity may not actually exist in nature, and the examples given by Behe and others may not in fact represent irreducible complexity, but can be explained in terms of simpler precursors. The theory of facilitated variation challenges irreducible complexity. Marc W. Kirschner, a professor and chair of Department of Systems Biology at Harvard Medical School, and John C. Gerhart, a professor in Molecular and Cell Biology, University of California, Berkeley, presented this theory in 2005. They describe how certain mutation and changes can cause apparent irreducible complexity. Thus, seemingly irreducibly complex structures are merely "very complex", or they are simply misunderstood or misrepresented.

=== Gradual adaptation to new functions ===
The precursors of complex systems, when they are not useful in themselves, may be useful to perform other, unrelated functions. Evolutionary biologists argue that evolution often works in this kind of blind, haphazard manner in which the function of an early form is not necessarily the same as the function of the later form. The term used for this process is exaptation. The mammalian middle ear (derived from a jawbone) and the panda's thumb (derived from a wrist bone spur) provide classic examples. A 2006 article in Nature demonstrates intermediate states leading toward the development of the ear in a Devonian fish (about 360 million years ago). Furthermore, recent research shows that viruses play a heretofore unexpected role in evolution by mixing and matching genes from various hosts.

Arguments for irreducibility often assume that things started out the same way they ended up—as we see them now. However, that may not necessarily be the case. In the Dover trial an expert witness for the plaintiffs, Ken Miller, demonstrated this possibility using Behe's mousetrap analogy. By removing several parts, Miller made the object unusable as a mousetrap, but he pointed out that it was now a perfectly functional, if unstylish, tie clip.

=== Methods by which irreducible complexity may evolve ===
Irreducible complexity can be seen as equivalent to an "uncrossable valley" in a fitness landscape. A number of mathematical models of evolution have explored the circumstances under which such valleys can, nevertheless, be crossed.

An example of a structure that is claimed in Dembski's book No Free Lunch to be irreducibly complex, but evidently has evolved, is the protein T-urf13, which is responsible for the cytoplasmic male sterility of waxy corn and is due to a completely new gene. It arose from the fusion of several non-protein-coding fragments of mitochondrial DNA and the occurrence of several mutations, all of which were necessary. Behe's book Darwin Devolves claims that things like this would take billions of years and could not arise from random tinkering, but the corn was bred during the 20th century. When presented with T-urf13 as an example for the evolvability of irreducibly complex systems, the Discovery Institute resorted to its flawed probability argument based on false premises, akin to the Texas sharpshooter fallacy.

=== Falsifiability and experimental evidence ===
Some critics, such as Jerry Coyne (professor of evolutionary biology at the University of Chicago) and Eugenie Scott (a physical anthropologist and former executive director of the National Center for Science Education) have argued that the concept of irreducible complexity and, more generally, intelligent design is not falsifiable and, therefore, not scientific.

Behe argues that the theory that irreducibly complex systems could not have evolved can be falsified by an experiment where such systems are evolved. For example, he posits taking bacteria with no flagellum and imposing a selective pressure for mobility. If, after a few thousand generations, the bacteria evolved the bacterial flagellum, then Behe believes that this would refute his theory. This has been done: a laboratory experiment has been performed where "immotile strains of the bacterium Pseudomonas fluorescens that lack flagella [...] regained flagella within 96 hours via a two-step evolutionary pathway", concluding that "natural selection can rapidly rewire regulatory networks in very few, repeatable mutational steps".

Other critics take a different approach, pointing to experimental evidence that they consider falsification of the argument for intelligent design from irreducible complexity. For example, Kenneth Miller describes the lab work of Barry G. Hall on E. coli as showing that "Behe is wrong".

Other evidence that irreducible complexity is not a problem for evolution comes from the field of computer science, which routinely uses computer analogues of the processes of evolution in order to automatically design complex solutions to problems. The results of such genetic algorithms are frequently irreducibly complex since the process, like evolution, both removes non-essential components over time as well as adding new components. The removal of unused components with no essential function, like the natural process where rock underneath a natural arch is removed, can produce irreducibly complex structures without requiring the intervention of a designer. Researchers applying these algorithms automatically produce human-competitive designs—but no human designer is required.

=== Argument from ignorance ===
Intelligent design proponents attribute to an intelligent designer those biological structures they believe are irreducibly complex and therefore they say a natural explanation is insufficient to account for them. However, critics view irreducible complexity as a special case of the "complexity indicates design" claim, and thus see it as an argument from ignorance and as a God-of-the-gaps argument.

Eugenie Scott and Glenn Branch of the National Center for Science Education note that intelligent design arguments from irreducible complexity rest on the false assumption that a lack of knowledge of a natural explanation allows intelligent design proponents to assume an intelligent cause, when the proper response of scientists would be to say that we do not know, and further investigation is needed. Other critics describe Behe as saying that evolutionary explanations are not detailed enough to meet his standards, while at the same time presenting intelligent design as exempt from having to provide any positive evidence at all.

=== False dilemma ===
Irreducible complexity is at its core an argument against evolution. If truly irreducible systems are found, the argument goes, then intelligent design must be the correct explanation for their existence. However, this conclusion is based on the assumption that current evolutionary theory and intelligent design are the only two valid models to explain life, a false dilemma.

== In the Dover trial ==
At the 2005 Kitzmiller v. Dover Area School District trial, expert witness testimony defending ID and IC was given by Behe and Scott Minnich, who had been one of the "Johnson-Behe cadre of scholars" at Pajaro Dunes in 1993, was prominent in ID, and was now a tenured associate professor in microbiology at the University of Idaho. Behe conceded that there are no peer-reviewed papers supporting his claims that complex molecular systems, like the bacterial flagellum, the blood-clotting cascade, and the immune system, were intelligently designed nor are there any peer-reviewed articles supporting his argument that certain complex molecular structures are "irreducibly complex." There was extensive discussion of IC arguments about the bacterial flagellum, first published in Behe's 1996 book, and when Minnich was asked if similar claims in a 1994 Creation Research Society article presented the same argument, Minnich said he did not have any problem with that statement.

In the final ruling of Kitzmiller v. Dover Area School District, Judge Jones specifically singled out irreducible complexity:

- "... creationists made the same argument that the complexity of the bacterial flagellum supported creationism as Professors Behe and Minnich now make for ID. (P-853; P-845; 37:155–56 (Minnich))." (Page 34)
- "Professor Behe admitted in "Reply to My Critics" that there was a defect in his view of irreducible complexity because, while it purports to be a challenge to natural selection, it does not actually address "the task facing natural selection." and that "Professor Behe wrote that he hoped to "repair this defect in future work..." (Page 73)
- "As expert testimony revealed, the qualification on what is meant by "irreducible complexity" renders it meaningless as a criticism of evolution. (3:40 (Miller)). In fact, the theory of evolution proffers exaptation as a well-recognized, well-documented explanation for how systems with multiple parts could have evolved through natural means." (Page 74)
- "By defining irreducible complexity in the way that he has, Professor Behe attempts to exclude the phenomenon of exaptation by definitional fiat, ignoring as he does so abundant evidence which refutes his argument. Notably, the NAS has rejected Professor Behe's claim for irreducible complexity..." (Page 75)
- "As irreducible complexity is only a negative argument against evolution, it is refutable and accordingly testable, unlike ID [Intelligent Design], by showing that there are intermediate structures with selectable functions that could have evolved into the allegedly irreducibly complex systems. (2:15–16 (Miller)). Importantly, however, the fact that the negative argument of irreducible complexity is testable does not make testable the argument for ID. (2:15 (Miller); 5:39 (Pennock)). Professor Behe has applied the concept of irreducible complexity to only a few select systems: (1) the bacterial flagellum; (2) the blood-clotting cascade; and (3) the immune system. Contrary to Professor Behe's assertions with respect to these few biochemical systems among the myriad existing in nature, however, Dr. Miller presented evidence, based upon peer-reviewed studies, that they are not in fact irreducibly complex." (Page 76)
- "...on cross-examination, Professor Behe was questioned concerning his 1996 claim that science would never find an evolutionary explanation for the immune system. He was presented with fifty-eight peer-reviewed publications, nine books, and several immunology textbook chapters about the evolution of the immune system; however, he simply insisted that this was still not sufficient evidence of evolution, and that it was not "good enough." (23:19 (Behe))." (Page 78)
- "We therefore find that Professor Behe's claim for irreducible complexity has been refuted in peer-reviewed research papers and has been rejected by the scientific community at large. (17:45–46 (Padian); 3:99 (Miller)). Additionally, even if irreducible complexity had not been rejected, it still does not support ID as it is merely a test for evolution, not design. (2:15, 2:35–40 (Miller); 28:63–66 (Fuller)). We will now consider the purportedly "positive argument" for design encompassed in the phrase used numerous times by Professors Behe and Minnich throughout their expert testimony, which is the "purposeful arrangement of parts." Professor Behe summarized the argument as follows: We infer design when we see parts that appear to be arranged for a purpose. The strength of the inference is quantitative; the more parts that are arranged, the more intricately they interact, the stronger is our confidence in design. The appearance of design in aspects of biology is overwhelming. Since nothing other than an intelligent cause has been demonstrated to be able to yield such a strong appearance of design, Darwinian claims notwithstanding, the conclusion that the design seen in life is real design is rationally justified. (18:90–91, 18:109–10 (Behe); 37:50 (Minnich)). As previously indicated, this argument is merely a restatement of the Reverend William Paley's argument applied at the cell level. Minnich, Behe, and Paley reach the same conclusion, that complex organisms must have been designed using the same reasoning, except that Professors Behe and Minnich refuse to identify the designer, whereas Paley inferred from the presence of design that it was God. (1:6–7 (Miller); 38:44, 57 (Minnich)). Expert testimony revealed that this inductive argument is not scientific and as admitted by Professor Behe, can never be ruled out. (2:40 (Miller); 22:101 (Behe); 3:99 (Miller))." (Pages 79–80)

== See also ==
- Anthropic principle
- ATP synthase
- Emergence
- Molecular motor

== Notes and references ==
- Forrest, Barbara; Gross, Paul R. (2007). Creationism's Trojan Horse. Oxford University Press. ISBN 978-0-19-531973-6.
- Scott, Eugenie C. (2009). Evolution Vs. Creationism: An Introduction. ISSR library. University of California Press. ISBN 978-0-520-26187-7.
