= The Genealogical Adam and Eve =

2019 book by S. Joshua Swamidass

The Genealogical Adam and Eve: The Surprising Science of Universal Ancestry
- US paperback cover
- Author: S. Joshua Swamidass
- Language: English
- Subjects: Evolution; creationism
- Publisher: InterVarsity Press
- Publication date: December 10, 2019
- Publication place: United States
- Media type: Print (paperback)
- Pages: 264
- ISBN: 978-1-514-00383-1

The Genealogical Adam and Eve: The Surprising Science of Universal Ancestry is a 2019 book by S. Joshua Swamidass. In this book, Swamidass, a computational biologist and Christian, uses the findings of biology and genealogy to affirm belief in both evolution and a historical Genesis creation narrative.

== Background ==
Swamidass grew up in a Christian family, with his parents raising him as a Young Earth creationist. Even after learning about evolution, however, he continued to be interested in the Christian faith. In 2019, he founded Peaceful Science, a community where he writes regularly about reconciling science with the religious public. His work in this area motivated him to write The Genealogical Adam and Eve.

== Synopsis ==
=== Creation-evolution controversy ===
Swamidass begins the book by describing the existing conflict between evolutionary science and most interpretations of the Genesis creation narrative. The most common interpretations of the Book of Genesis read as Adam and Eve being the first two humans to ever exist, with all of humankind descending from that single, divinely created couple. However, the long-held scientific consensus is that humans have existed since well before 10,000 years ago, having evolved through natural selection rather than being specially created. Swamidass explains that many religious groups have rejected evolution on the grounds of biblical inerrancy, while atheists and most theistic evolutionists discard any belief in a historical Adam and Eve on the grounds that such a belief is incompatible with the findings of science.

=== "Genealogical hypothesis" ===
Swamidass then posits what he calls the "genealogical hypothesis" (GH), which bears a striking resemblance to "Adamic exceptionalism" in Islam:

Entirely consistent with the genetic and archeological evidence, it is possible that Adam was created out of dust, and Eve out of his rib, less than ten thousand years ago. Leaving the Garden, their offspring would have blended with those outside it, biologically identical neighbors from the surrounding area. In a few thousand years, they would become genealogical ancestors of everyone.

Following this, he considers various points to argue that his hypothesis is plausible within the findings of science as well as theology:

1. Swamidass argues that it is possible for a single couple who lived in the Middle East less than 10,000 years ago to be the ancestors of nearly every human on Earth by the year 1 CE.
2. The definitions of the term human are completely different in biology and theology; even within each respective field, there is some debate as to how to precisely define it. Scientists often debate whether certain species, such as Australopithecus afarensis, should be described as human. Theologians, on the other hand, are unsure of how to define the image of God, which is meant to be the key characteristic of humans in Scripture. This ambiguity provides flexibility in answering the question of the origins of humankind.
3. The Book of Genesis may provide some evidence that humans already existed by the time of the special creation of Adam and Eve. Swamidass suggests that Chapter 2 might take place after Chapter 1 chronologically; alternatively, he suggests that Chapter 2 is a "zoomed-in" account of what was happening in a specific area in the Middle East during the events of Chapter 1. Such a hypothesis would provide room for biological humans to evolve from ape-like ancestors outside the Garden of Eden, while Adam and Eve are specially created in the Garden as the first "textual humans."

=== Synthesis of evolution and Genesis ===
By defining "textual humans" as the members of the genealogical tree rooted at Adam and Eve, and "people outside the Garden", as humans who emerged through evolution by natural selection, (Note: Swamidass clarifies that this distinction is purely theological, and that the people outside the Garden were not sub-human in any way; the GH agrees with the position of evidence-based science against polygenism.) Swamidass argues that the evidence shows a compatibility between a historical—though not completely literal—reading of Genesis and the evolutionary history of life. Science—asserts Swamidass—tells the story of humankind starting from its evolutionary origins, while the Bible tells the story of the Fall of man, its aftermath, and humankind's redemption.

=== "Skeptic of the conflict" ===
Swamidass concludes his book by stating that he is a "skeptic of the conflict" between science and Genesis. He writes that most atheists, theistic evolutionists, and creationists share the belief that science is incompatible with a literal, historical Adam and Eve; the conflict or "fracture" comes down to which "story" each group dismisses in favor of the other. Swamidass writes that he hopes his GH will help refute that belief, and that it will require "tolerance, humility," and "patience" for people of all three groups to come together to resolve this longstanding religious controversy.

=== "Evidence and the Resurrection" ===
The first appendix of the book is the only one available in the print edition; it is a reprint of a 2017 essay by Swamidass. He dedicates this appendix to discussing his belief in the resurrection of Jesus, which he states is the foundation of his faith in God. Swamidass cites several examples of details of Jesus's life that he believes were predicted in the Hebrew Bible. His approach has been interpreted as encouraging readers to rest their faith on the miracles related to Jesus's life in the New Testament rather than only on the apparent intelligent design of life in the natural world. Swamidass also asserts that the scientists Blaise Pascal, Johann Kepler, Robert Boyle, Gregor Mendel, Asa Gray, Michael Faraday, James Clerk Maxwell, Santiago Ramón y Cajal, and Francis Collins were all "reached" by God through the Resurrection.

== Reception ==
The book has generated a range of responses; some are written from a religious view, and others, from a scientific view. Writing for The Gospel Coalition, Hans Madueme says: "As far as I can see, Swamidass’s revisionism lacks a convincing exegetical or theological basis." Madueme criticizes the book, arguing that its assumptions about the biological origins of the people outside the Garden are incompatible with Scripture, but praises the effort to reconcile science and religion. Professor Nathan H. Lents of The City University of New York comments on the potential impact on Christians of Swamidass's approach to Genesis: "This will not tempt someone like me to believe in the creation story laid out in Genesis. But it just might allow those who do believe to be more open to evolution and, god willing, to science more broadly."
