= Michael Behe =

American biochemist and intelligent design advocate (born 1952)

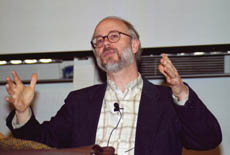
- Behe in 2008
- Born: Michael Joseph Behe; January 18, 1952 (age 74); Altoona, Pennsylvania, U.S.
- Education: Drexel University (BS); University of Pennsylvania (PhD)
- Occupation: Chemistry professor
- Known for: Irreducible complexity
- Scientific career
- Fields: Biochemistry
- Workplaces: Lehigh University; Discovery Institute's Center for Science and Culture
- Thesis: Investigation of some physical chemical factors affecting the gelation of sickle cell hemoglobin (1978)

Michael Joseph Behe (/ˈbiːhiː/ BEE-hee; born January 18, 1952) is an American biochemist and an advocate of the pseudoscientific principle of intelligent design (ID).

Behe serves as professor of biochemistry at Lehigh University in Bethlehem, Pennsylvania, and as a senior fellow of the Discovery Institute's Center for Science and Culture. He advocates for the validity of the argument for irreducible complexity (IC), which claims that some biochemical structures are too complex to be explained by known evolutionary mechanisms and are therefore probably the result of intelligent design. Behe has testified in several court cases related to intelligent design, including the court case Kitzmiller v. Dover Area School District, where his views were cited in the ruling that intelligent design is not science and is religious in nature.

As of 2014, Behe was unfavorably regarded by the scientific community; the scientific community had "thoroughly rejected" his work on intelligent design.

== Early life and education ==
Behe was born in Altoona, Pennsylvania, and grew up in Harrisburg, Pennsylvania, where he graduated from Bishop McDevitt High School. He graduated from Drexel University with a Bachelor of Science in chemistry in 1974. He then earned his Ph.D. in biochemistry from the University of Pennsylvania in 1978. His doctoral dissertation was titled, "Investigation of some physical chemical factors affecting the gelation of sickle cell hemoglobin".

From 1978 to 1982, he did postdoctoral work on DNA structure at the National Institutes of Health. From 1982 to 1985, he was assistant professor of chemistry at Queens College in New York City, where he met his wife, Celeste. In 1985, he moved to Lehigh University in Bethlehem, Pennsylvania, where he is currently a professor of biochemistry. From 2005 to 2024, Lehigh University's department of biological sciences exhibited a position statement on its website stating that its faculty reject Behe's views on evolution:

The department faculty, then, are unequivocal in their support of evolutionary theory, which has its roots in the seminal work of Charles Darwin and has been supported by findings accumulated over 140 years. The sole dissenter from this position, Prof. Michael Behe, is a well-known proponent of "intelligent design." While we respect Prof. Behe's right to express his views, they are his alone and are in no way endorsed by the department. It is our collective position that intelligent design has no basis in science, has not been tested experimentally, and should not be regarded as scientific.

As of 2024, his faculty webpage states: "My arguments about irreducible complexity and intelligent design are my own, and are not endorsed either by Lehigh University in general or by the Department of Biological Sciences in particular." Behe said that the university' biology department gave no scientific evidence that intelligent design "has no basis in science".

== Career ==
Behe says he once fully accepted the scientific theory of evolution, but that after reading Evolution: A Theory in Crisis (1985), by Michael Denton, he came to question evolution. Later, Behe came to believe that there was evidence, at a biochemical level, that some biological systems were "irreducibly complex". He thought that these systems could not, even in principle, have evolved by natural selection. He believed that the only possible alternative explanation for such complex structures was that they were created by an "intelligent designer". Irreducible complexity has been rejected by the scientific community.

The 1987 Edwards v. Aguillard U.S. Supreme Court decision barred the required teaching of creation science from public schools but allowed evolutionary theory on the grounds of scientific validity. After the decision, a later draft of the textbook Of Pandas and People (1989) systematically replaced each and every cognate of the word "creation" with the phrase "intelligent design" or similar ID terms. The books of lawyer Phillip E. Johnson on theistic realism dealt directly with criticism of evolutionary theory and its purported biased "materialist" science, and aimed to legitimize the teaching of creationism in schools. In March 1992, a conference at Southern Methodist University brought Behe together with other leading figures into what Johnson later called the "wedge strategy." In 1993, the "Johnson-Behe cadre of scholars" met at Pajaro Dunes, California, and Behe presented for the first time his idea of irreducibly complex molecular machinery. Following a summer 1995 conference, "The Death of Materialism and the Renewal of Culture," the group obtained funding through the Discovery Institute.

For the 1993 edition of Pandas, Behe wrote a chapter on blood clotting, presenting arguments which he later presented in very similar terms in a chapter in his 1996 book Darwin's Black Box. Behe later agreed that they were essentially the same when he defended intelligent design at the Dover trial.

In 1996, Behe became a senior fellow of the Discovery Institute's Center for the Renewal of Science and Culture, later renamed the Center for Science and Culture, an organization dedicated to promoting intelligent design.

=== Darwin's Black Box ===
In 1996, Behe published his ideas on irreducible complexity in his book Darwin's Black Box. Behe's refusal to identify the nature of any proposed intelligent designer frustrates scientists, who see it as a move to avoid any possibility of testing the positive claims of ID while allowing him and the intelligent design movement to distance themselves from some of the more overtly religiously motivated critics of evolution.

As to the identity of the intelligent designer, Behe responds that if, deep in the woods, one were to come across a group of flowers that clearly spelled out the name "LEHIGH", one would have no doubt that the pattern was the result of intelligent design. Determining who the designer was, however, would not be nearly as easy.

In 1997, Russell Doolittle, on whose work Behe based much of the blood-clotting discussion in Darwin's Black Box, wrote a rebuttal to the statements about irreducible complexity of certain systems. In particular, Doolittle mentioned the issue of the blood clotting in his article, "A Delicate Balance." Later on, in 2003, Doolittle's lab published a paper in the peer-reviewed journal Proceedings of the National Academy of Sciences which demonstrates that the pufferfish lacks at least three out of 26 blood clotting factors, yet still has a workable blood clotting system. According to Doolittle, this defeats a key claim in Behe's book, that blood clotting is irreducibly complex.

In reviewing a book by Robert T. Pennock, Behe took issue with the "intelligent design" group being associated with "creationism," saying readers would typically take that to mean biblical literalism and young Earth creationism (YEC). In 2001 Pennock responded that he had been careful to represent their views correctly, and that while several leaders of the intelligent design movement were young Earth creationists, others including Behe were "old-earthers" and "creationists in the core sense of the term, namely, that they reject the scientific, evolutionary account of the origin of species and want to replace it with a form of special creation."

=== Behe and Snoke article ===
In 2004, Behe published a paper with David Snoke, in the scientific journal Protein Science that uses a simple mathematical model to simulate the rate of evolution of proteins by point mutation, which he states supports irreducible complexity, based on the calculation of the probability of mutations required for evolution to succeed. However, the paper does not mention intelligent design nor irreducible complexity, which were removed, according to Behe, at the behest of the reviewers. Nevertheless, the Discovery Institute lists it as one of the "Peer-Reviewed & Peer-Edited Scientific Publications Supporting the Theory of Intelligent Design."

Michael Lynch authored a response, to which Behe and Snoke responded. Protein Science discussed the papers in an editorial.

Numerous scientists have debunked the work, pointing out that not only has it been shown that a supposedly irreducibly complex structure can evolve, but that it can do so within a reasonable time even subject to unrealistically harsh restrictions, and noting that Behe and Snoke's paper does not properly include natural selection and genetic redundancy. When the issue raised by Behe and Snoke is tested in the modern framework of evolutionary biology, numerous simple pathways to complexity have been shown. In their response, Behe and Snoke assumed that intermediate mutations are always damaging, where modern science allows for neutral or positive mutations. Some of the critics have also noted that the Discovery Institute continues to claim the paper as 'published evidence for design,' despite its offering no design theory nor attempting to model the design process, and therefore not providing an alternative to random chance.

Many of Behe's statements have been challenged by biologist Kenneth R. Miller in his book, Finding Darwin's God (1999). Behe has subsequently disputed Miller's points in an online essay.

=== The Edge of Evolution ===
In 2007, Behe's book The Edge of Evolution was published arguing that while evolution can produce changes within species, there is a limit to the ability of evolution to generate diversity, and this limit (the "edge of evolution") is somewhere between species and orders.

In this book Behe's central assertion is that Darwinian evolution actually exists but plays only a limited role in the development and diversification of life on Earth. To this aim, he examines the genetic changes undergone by the malaria plasmodium genome and the human genome in response to each other's biological defenses, and identifies that "the situation resembles trench warfare, not an arms race", by considering the hemoglobin-destroying, protein pump-compromising as a "war by attrition". Starting from this example, he takes into account the number of mutations required to "travel" from one genetic state to another, as well as population size for the organism in question. Then, Behe calculates what he calls the "edge of evolution", i.e., the point at which Darwinian evolution would no longer be an efficacious agent of creative biological change, arguing that purposeful design plays a major role in the development of biological complexity, through the mechanism of producing "non-random mutations", which are then subjected to the sculpting hand of natural selection.

The book was reviewed, by prominent scientists in The New York Times, The New Republic, The Globe and Mail, Science, and Nature who were highly critical of the work noting that Behe appears to accept almost all of evolutionary theory, barring random mutation, which is replaced with guided mutation at the hand of an unnamed designer. The book earned Behe the Pigasus Award for the year 2007.

=== Darwin Devolves ===
Behe also promotes intelligent design in his 2019 book, Darwin Devolves, whose central premise is that the combination of random mutation and natural selection, apart from being incapable of generating novelty, is mainly a degradative force. Like his previous books, Darwin Devolves received negative reviews from the scientific community, including a scathing review in Science by Nathan H. Lents, Richard Lenski, and S. Joshua Swamidass, a harsh critique by Jerry Coyne in The Washington Post, and a scholarly rebuttal in Evolution from Gregory Lang and Amber Rice, Behe's colleagues at Lehigh University. Lents said of Darwin Devolves and The Edge of Evolution: "his [ ] two books totally missed their marks and were easily dismissed by the scientific community."

Lang and Rice's assessment noted that while Behe rightfully acknowledges that organisms have common ancestry, it is posited that a designer is required for more distant relationships like at the family level, and that the presentation of degradative processes is exaggerated with evidence of beneficial adaptations dodged. The article also criticized the use of false analogies and neglecting evidence of new genetic raw material production for evolution ("Behe is correct that the loss of genetic information is an important mechanism. However, the opposing processes of gene duplication, horizontal gene transfer, and introgression balance out gene loss, providing a source of new genetic material"). They then concluded with examples of adaptation that contradict the book's conclusions and expound on the flaws of Irreducible Complexity, adding that "why evolution by natural selection is difficult for so many to accept is beyond the scope of this review; however, it is not for a lack of evidence."

=== Publications ===
Behe has written for the Boston Review, The American Spectator, and The New York Times.

== Court cases ==
=== Dover testimony ===
In Kitzmiller v. Dover Area School District, the first direct challenge brought in United States federal courts to an attempt to mandate the teaching of intelligent design on First Amendment grounds, Behe was called as a primary witness for the defense and asked to support the idea that intelligent design was legitimate science. Some of the most crucial exchanges in the trial occurred during Behe's cross-examination, where his testimony would prove devastating to the defense. Behe was forced to concede that that his definition of 'theory' as applied to intelligent design was so loose that astrology would also qualify.

=== ACSI v. Roman Stearns ===
Behe received $20,000 for testifying as an expert witness on behalf of the plaintiffs in Association of Christian Schools International v. Roman Stearns. The case was filed by Association of Christian Schools International, which argued that the University of California was being discriminatory by not recognizing science classes that use creationist books. The 2005 filing claimed that University of California's rejection of several of their courses was illegal "viewpoint discrimination and content regulation prohibited by the Free Speech Clause." In 2007, Behe's expert witness report claimed that the Christian textbooks, including William S. Pinkston, Jr.'s Biology for Christian Schools (1980; 2nd ed. 1994), are excellent works for high school students. He defended that view in a deposition.

In August 2008, Judge S. James Otero rejected Behe's claims, saying that Behe "submitted a declaration concluding that the BJU [Bob Jones University Press] text mentions standard scientific content. ... However, Professor Behe 'did not consider how much detail or depth' the texts gave to this standard content." Otero ruled in favor of the University of California's decision to reject courses using these books.

== Personal life ==
Behe is a Catholic. He is married to Celeste Behe and they have nine children who are homeschooled.

== Publications ==
=== Books ===
- Behe, Michael J. (1996). Darwin's Black Box: The Biochemical Challenge to Evolution. New York: Free Press. ISBN 978-0-684-82754-4. LCCN 96000695. OCLC 34150540.
- ——; Dembski, William A.; Meyer, Stephen C. (2000). Science and Evidence for Design in the Universe: Papers Presented at a Conference Sponsored by the Wethersfield Institute, New York City, September 25, 1999. Proceedings of the Wethersfield Institute. Vol. 9. San Francisco, CA: Ignatius Press. ISBN 978-0-89870-809-7. LCCN 00102374. OCLC 45720008.
- —— (2003). "Design in the Details: The Origin of Biomolecular Machines". In Campbell, John Angus; Meyer, Stephen C. (eds.). Darwinism, Design and Public Education. Rhetoric and Public Affairs Series. East Lansing, MI: Michigan State University Press. pp. 287–302. ISBN 978-0-87013-670-2. LCCN 2003020507. OCLC 53145654.
- —— (2003). "The modern intelligent design hypothesis: breaking rules". In Manson, Neal A. (ed.). God and Design: The Teleological Argument and Modern Science. London; New York: Routledge. pp. 277–291. ISBN 978-0-415-26344-3. LCCN 2002027548. OCLC 50447710.
- —— (2004). "Irreducible Complexity: Obstacle to Darwinian Evolution". In Dembski, William A.; Ruse, Michael (eds.). Debating Design: From Darwin to DNA. New York: Cambridge University Press. pp. 352–370. ISBN 978-0-521-82949-6. LCCN 2004047363. OCLC 54826160. "Papers from a conference, entitled Design and its Critics, held at Concordia University, Mequon, Wis., June 22–24, 2000."
- ——; Singh, Thoudam Damodara (2005). God, Intelligent Design & Fine-Tuning: A Discussion Between Michael J. Behe and T.D. Singh. Kolkata, West Bengal: Bhaktivedanta Institute. ISBN 978-81-89635-01-5. LCCN 2006554901. OCLC 70631564.
- —— (2007). The Edge of Evolution: The Search for the Limits of Darwinism. New York: Free Press. ISBN 978-0-7432-9620-5. LCCN 2007298379. OCLC 136958644.
- —— (2013). "Getting There First: An Evolutionary Rate Advantage for Adaptive Loss-of-Function Mutations". In Marks II, Robert J.; Behe, Michael J.; Dembski, William A.; Gordon, Bruce L.; Sanford, John C. (eds.). Biological Information--New Perspectives: Proceedings of a Symposium Held May 31, 2011 Through June 3, 2011 at Cornell University. Hackensack, NJ: World Scientific Publishing Co. pp. 450–473. ISBN 978-981-4508-71-1. LCCN 2013016707. OCLC 858441131.
- —— (2019). Darwin Devolves: The New Science About DNA That Challenges Evolution. San Francisco: HarperOne. ISBN 978-0-06-284261-9. LCCN 2018034062. OCLC 1049576124.

=== Journal articles ===
DNA structure

- Behe, Michael J.; Felsenfeld, Gary; Szu, Shousun Chen; Charney, Elliot (February 1985). "Temperature-dependent conformational transitions in poly(dG-dC) and poly(dG-m^{5}dC)". Biopolymers. 24 (2): 289–300. doi:10.1002/bip.360240202. ISSN 0006-3525. PMID 3978220. S2CID 46173376.
- —— (March 1986). "Vacuum UV CD of the low-salt Z-forms of poly(rG-dC).poly(rG-dC), and poly(dG-m^{5}dC).poly(dG-m^{5}dC)". Biopolymers. 25 (3): 519–523. doi:10.1002/bip.360250310. ISSN 0006-3525. PMID 3754471. S2CID 44340223.
- —— (December 1987). "The DNA sequence of the human β-globin region is strongly biased in favor of long strings of contiguous purine or pyrimidine residues". Biochemistry. 26 (24): 7870–7875. doi:10.1021/bi00398a050. ISSN 0006-2960. PMID 3427110.
- ——; Beasty, Anne M. (1991). "Co-polymer tracts in eukaryotic, prokaryotic, and organellar DNA". DNA Sequence. 1 (5): 291–302. doi:10.3109/10425179109020785. ISSN 1940-1736. OCLC 474190174. PMID 1799681.
- —— (February 25, 1995). "An overabundance of long oligopurine tracts occurs in the genome of simple and complex eukaryotes". Nucleic Acids Research. 23 (4): 689–695. doi:10.1093/nar/23.4.689. ISSN 0305-1048. PMC 306739. PMID 7899090.
- —— (1998). "Tracts of adenosine and cytidine residues in the genomes of prokaryotes and eukaryotes". DNA Sequence. 8 (6): 375–383. doi:10.3109/10425179809020898. ISSN 1940-1736. PMID 10728822.

Protein structure

- Behe, Michael J.; Englander, S. Walter (July 1978). "Sickle hemoglobin gelation. Reaction order and critical nucleus size". Biophysical Journal. 23 (1): 129–145. Bibcode:1978BpJ....23..129B. doi:10.1016/S0006-3495(78)85438-1. ISSN 0006-3495. PMC 1473549. PMID 667302.
- ——; —— (September 5, 1979). "Mixed gelation theory. Kinetics, equilibrium and gel incorporation in sickle hemoglobin mixtures". Journal of Molecular Biology. 133 (1): 137–160. doi:10.1016/0022-2836(79)90254-7. ISSN 0022-2836. PMID 93643.
- ——; —— (September 18, 1979). "Quantitative assessment of the noncovalent inhibition of sickle hemoglobin gelation by phenyl derivatives and other known agents". Biochemistry. 18 (19): 4196–4201. doi:10.1021/bi00586a025. ISSN 0006-2960. PMID 486417.
- ——; Lattman, Eaton E.; Rose, George D. (May 15, 1991). "The protein-folding problem: the native fold determines packing, but does packing determine the native fold?". Proceedings of the National Academy of Sciences of the United States of America. 88 (10): 4195–4199. Bibcode:1991PNAS...88.4195B. doi:10.1073/pnas.88.10.4195. ISSN 0027-8424. PMC 51625. PMID 2034665.

Evolution

- Behe, Michael J. (October 1990). "Histone deletion mutants challenge the molecular clock hypothesis". Trends in Biochemical Sciences. 15 (10): 374–376. doi:10.1016/0968-0004(90)90231-Y. ISSN 0968-0004. PMID 2251727.
- —— (March 2000). "Self-Organization and Irreducibly Complex Systems: A Reply to Shanks and Joplin". Philosophy of Science. 67 (1): 155–162. doi:10.1086/392766. ISSN 0031-8248. JSTOR 188618. S2CID 53975381.
- —— (November 2001). "Reply to My Critics: A Response to Reviews of Darwin's Black Box: The Biochemical Challenge to Evolution" (PDF). Biology and Philosophy. 16 (5): 685–709. doi:10.1023/A:1012268700496. ISSN 0169-3867. S2CID 34945871. Archived from the original (PDF) on December 5, 2013.
- ——; Snoke, David W. (October 2004). "Simulating evolution by gene duplication of protein features that require multiple amino acid residues". Protein Science. 13 (10): 2651–2664. doi:10.1110/ps.04802904. ISSN 0961-8368. PMC 2286568. PMID 15340163.
- —— (December 2010). "Experimental evolution, loss-of-function mutations, and 'the first rule of adaptive evolution'" (PDF). The Quarterly Review of Biology. 85 (4): 419–445. doi:10.1086/656902. ISSN 0033-5770. JSTOR 656902. PMID 21243963. S2CID 1070352. Archived from the original (PDF) on June 28, 2014.

=== Media articles ===
- Behe, Michael J. (October 29, 1996). "Darwin Under the Microscope". The New York Times (Op-ed). p. A25.
- —— (August 13, 1999). "Teach Evolution—And Ask Hard Questions". The New York Times (Op-ed). p. A21.
- —— (April 2002). "The Challenge of Irreducible Complexity". Natural History. 111 (3): 74. ISSN 0028-0712.
- —— (February 7, 2005). "Design for Living". The New York Times (Op-ed). p. A21.

=== Film and video appearances ===
- Behe, Michael J. (1997). Irreducible Complexity: The Biochemical Challenge to Darwinian Theory (Public lecture). Pasadena, CA: Reasons to Believe. OCLC 827561263.
- —— (2001). Intelligent Design: From the Big Bang to Irreducible Complexity: An Interview with Dr. Michael Behe (Interview). Colorado Springs, CO: Access Research Network. OCLC 49254259.
- —— (2002). Unlocking the Mystery of Life (Interview). Colorado Springs, CO: Focus on the Family; Illustra Media. OCLC 51949578.
- —— (2003). Where Does the Evidence Lead?: Exploring the Theory of Intelligent Design (Interview). Murrieta, CA: Illustra Media. OCLC 60849776.
- Olson, Randy (Writer, Director); Carlisle, Ty (Producer); Behe, Michael J. (Interviewee) (2006). Flock of Dodos: The Evolution-Intelligent Design Circus (Motion picture). New York: Docurama Films. ISBN 978-0-767-09819-9. LCCN 2011604915. OCLC 162139273.
