= Stanisław Musiał =

Polish Jesuit writer (1938–2004)

Personal details
- Born: 1 May 1938 Łososina Górna, Second Polish Republic
- Died: 5 March 2004 (aged 65) Kraków, Poland
- Education: Jesuit University of Philosophy and Education Ignatianum; Collegium Bobolanum

Stanisław Musiał (1 May 1938, Łososina Górna, Poland – 5 March 2004 Kraków) was a Catholic priest and a pioneer and leader of Catholic-Jewish dialogue and Polish-Jewish reconciliation.

== Biography ==
He studied philosophy at the Facultas Philosophiae Societatis Jesu in Kraków and theology at the Bobolanum Theological Faculty in Warsaw, as well as in Rome in Munich. He was ordained as a priest in 1963 and attended the Second Vatican Council.

A long-time member of the editorial board of Poland's Tygodnik Powszechny, he also directed Kraków's Apostleship of Prayer Publishing House in the years immediately following the Solidarity revolution in Poland. He wrote numerous articles in Gazeta Wyborcza, Midrasz, and Polin on antisemitism, Catholic-Jewish relations, and issues between Poland and world Jewry; in 1997 his article "Czarne jest Czarne" ("Black Is Black"), won a prize for best article written in the Polish press. He went on to become the first Pole to win the Pulitzer Prize.

He was one of the strongest and most forthright voices in the Polish Catholic Church for tolerance and mutual understanding, and was intensely devoted to combating antisemitism and xenophobia.

As a member of the Episcopal Commission for Dialog with Judaism from the time of its creation in 1986 until 1997, Fr. Musiał played a key role in organizing and facilitating a Geneva meeting among international Catholic and Jewish leaders that led to a 1987 agreement resolving the conflict over the Carmelite Convent at Auschwitz. He was an outspoken opponent of the mounting of public crosses at the convent, and what he saw as the attempted "Christianization" of Auschwitz.

In 2001 he published an article calling for the removal of an anti-Semitic painting at Sandomierz Cathedral. this article created much controversy and debate. In 2017, the painting was still on display, but was accompanied by a plaque noting that the painting is not accurate.

Active in numerous academic and human rights forums, Fr. Musiał was a member of the board of the Geneva-based United Nations Watch and Kraków's Judaica Foundation - Center For Jewish Culture, as well as being closely involved with the Auschwitz Jewish Center in Oswiecim.

== Legacy ==
The Stanisław Musiał Award is given out to people who have made outstanding contributions to Christian- and Polish-Jewish dialogue.
