= Evolution Without Evidence =

1982 book by Barry G. Gale

Evolution Without Evidence: Charles Darwin and "The Origin of Species"
- Title page for Evolution Without Evidence: Charles Darwin and "The Origin of Species" (1982)
- Author: Dr. Barry G. Gale
- Subject: Charles Darwin, Evolution
- Publisher: University of New Mexico Press
- Publication date: 1982

Evolution Without Evidence: Charles Darwin and "The Origin of Species" is a 1982 book by historian Barry G. Gale.

Contrary to the title, the book is not on the Creation–evolution controversy. Gale attempts to explain why Charles Darwin waited twenty years to publish his theory of natural selection and how his theory evolved during this period. The book heavily relies on Darwin's letters, notebooks, essays and papers. Darwin's private correspondences with Asa Gray and Joseph Hooker are cited.

== Evolution Without Evidence: Charles Darwin and "The Origin of Species" ==
Gale explores Darwin's inexperience in botany and zoology as they pertain to his theory. This allowed him to convince others of Darwin's theory. Gale also discusses how Darwin uses social skills to get information and help for his theories and others. Lastly, Gale mentions Darwin's failure to convince important experts in the field and why he was forced to publish his theory prematurely.

== Summary of Darwin's theory ==
Charles Darwin was an English naturalist who came up with the theory of Darwinism. Darwinism embedded the theory of biological evolution. He claimed that all species of organisms develop through natural selection. Darwin's theory of natural selection is, "the differential survival and reproduction of individuals due to differences in phenotype."

== Criticism of Darwin's theory ==
Reception of Darwin's theory of evolution was met with mixed views particularly in the religious community. Specifically the church of England spoke out against the book, while liberal Anglicans supported his theory as an instrument used by God. During this time, Darwin's excitement seemed to grow as he utilized his correspondents to gain more support for his theory.

== Darwin's correspondents ==
Asa Gray was a well renowned American botanist who authored Gray's Manual. Gray was a supporter of Charles Darwin, even though they had different bases of beliefs. However Gray became a proponent for Darwin's theory and garner support for it by incorporating the theory as an extension of a divine creator.

Joseph Hooker was a British botanist famously argued in favor of Darwin's theory against the then bishop of Oxford. In his essay the introductory Introductory Essay to the Flora Tasmaniae, he announced his support for Darwin's theory which marked the first recognizable man of science publicly backing Charles Darwin. Hooker and Darwin exchanged roughly 1400 letters over the course of 40 years during their friendship.

== Reception to Gale's book ==
The book has received positive reviews, but the title has been criticized as misleading. Muriel L. Blaisdell a professor of interdisciplinary studies praised the research of the book and described it as "easily accessible to the general reader... A new portrait of Darwin with its distinctively modern styling."

Historian of science Philip F. Rehbock positively reviewed the book, stating it "will prove most useful to those who are looking for a direct path into the mountain of Darwinian literature. They will find Gale's route clearly articulated, heavily documented, adequately indexed, and unburdened by technical terminology."

Biologist Richard Lewontin commented in a review "What is appealing in Gale’s work is a picture of a life in the social community of science that corresponds to our everyday experience of how careers are built."

Biologist Gert Korthof has reviewed the book in depth. He felt that the book seemed to present unbiased, well researched evaluation of Darwin's theory and shed light on the lack of evidence behind it.

The book does not say that Darwin did not have evidence in order to support his theory of Evolution.
