= Gert Korthof =

Dutch biologist

Gert Korthof is a Dutch biologist who was trained at Utrecht University. He has reviewed various books of evolution, creationism, and intelligent design, including Michael Behe's The Edge of Evolution. He contributed to Why Intelligent Design Fails: A Scientific Critique of the New Creationism.
