= MRNA (disambiguation) =

mRNA (or messenger RNA) is ribonucleic acid (RNA) that is read by the ribosome to produce a protein.

mRNA may also refer to:

- miRNA, a small non-coding RNA molecule
- Moderna, a company with this stock ticker "MRNA"

== See also ==
- mDNA
