= Darwin's Black Box =

1996 book by Michael Behe

- Cover of the first edition
- Author: Michael Behe
- Language: English
- Subject: Intelligent design
- Publisher: Free Press
- Publication date: 1996
- Publication place: United States
- Media type: Print (Hardcover and Paperback)
- ISBN: 978-0-684-82754-4
- OCLC: 34150540
- Dewey Decimal: 575 20
- LC Class: QH367.3 .B43 1996
- Followed by: The Edge of Evolution

Darwin's Black Box: The Biochemical Challenge to Evolution (1996; second edition 2006) is a book by Michael J. Behe, a professor of biochemistry at Lehigh University in Pennsylvania and a senior fellow of the Discovery Institute's Center for Science and Culture. In the book Behe presents his notion of irreducible complexity and argues that its presence in many biochemical systems therefore indicates that they must be the result of intelligent design rather than evolutionary processes. In 1993, Behe had written a chapter on blood clotting in Of Pandas and People, presenting essentially the same arguments but without the name "irreducible complexity," which he later presented in very similar terms in a chapter in Darwin's Black Box. Behe later agreed that he had written both and agreed to the similarities when he defended intelligent design at the Kitzmiller v. Dover Area School District trial.

The book has received highly critical reviews by many scientists, arguing that the assertions made by Behe fail with logical scrutiny and amount to pseudoscience. For example, in a review for Nature, Jerry Coyne panned the book for what he saw as usage of quote mining and spurious ad hominem attacks. The New York Times also, in a critique written by Richard Dawkins, condemned the book for having promoted discredited arguments. Despite this, the book has become a commercial success, and, as a bestseller, it received a mostly supportive review from Publishers Weekly, which described it as having a "spirited, witty critique of neo-Darwinian thinking" that may "spark interest." The politically conservative magazine National Review also voted Darwin's Black Box one of their top 100 non-fiction books of the century, using a panel that included Discovery Institute member George Gilder.

== Summary ==
The "black box" in the title refers to the conceptual tool in which, for one reason or another, the internal workings of a device are taken for granted, so that its function may be discussed. The philosophical tool is commonly used in scientific discourse, and Behe notes that understandings of cellular structure and other aspects of microbiology were not much understood when Charles Darwin was alive. He then states that he plans to delve into the issue.

Behe begins by reminding the general reader of paradigm shifts in the history of science, in which the foundations and assumptions of theories are examined, sometimes resulting in the rejection of an entire past theory. Behe suggests that such a paradigm shift in biology (and particularly in evolution) is imminent due to recent discoveries (circa 1996) in biochemistry. Behe acknowledges acceptance of the theory of evolution by "the great majority" of scientists, and he states that "most (though not all) do so based on authority."

Behe states that elucidations of the evolutionary history of various biological features typically assume the existence of certain abilities as their starting point, such as Charles Darwin's example of a cluster of light-sensitive spots evolving into an eye via a series of intermediate steps. He then points out that Darwin dismissed the need to explain the origin of the 'simple' light-sensitive spot, summarizes the modern understanding of the biochemistry of vision and claims that many other evolutionary explanations face a similar challenge.

Behe next introduces and defines the concept of irreducible complexity as a system with a series of parts in which the removal of any part causes the entire system to cease functioning, offering a spring-loaded bar mousetrap as a familiar example. In the following chapters, Behe discusses the apparent irreducible complexity of several biological systems, including the cilium, the bacterial flagellum, blood clotting, the immune system, and vesicular transport. Behe claims the underlying complexity and biochemical mechanisms of the systems are vastly under-appreciated, and identifies other, similar systems.

Behe identifies one of the primary counter-arguments of irreducible complexity, gradual adaptation—that certain systems may have been co-opted from an original, unrelated role to assume a new function as an irreducibly complex system. He counter-argues that though it is impossible to consider all possible roles for any component, it is extremely implausible that components can fortuitously change function within a complex system and that the focus of the theory changes from making to modifying components and recounts unsuccessful attempts to discover evolutionary pathways for complex systems within scientific journals. Behe states that though he did identify assertions that evolution had occurred, he found none that had been supported by experiment or calculation, and concludes the book by offering intelligent design as a solution to irreducible complexity.

== Reception ==
Darwin's Black Box was not well received by the scientific community, which rejected Behe's premises and arguments. Kenneth Miller described Behe's argument as an updated version of the argument from design with reference to biochemistry (which was echoed by other reviewers), and also cites areas in biochemistry and the fossil record which demonstrate currently irreducibly complex systems evolving. Miller also describes Behe's theory as unfalsifiable, arguing that it arbitrarily ignores evidence that shows the evolution of a biochemical system. On his blog, PZ Myers described it as "...an example of pseudoscientific dreck that has been enormously influential." In a review for Nature, Jerry Coyne described the book hailing from 'populist' creationism that failed to deal with the evidence for evolution honestly. Coyne also accuses Behe of quote mining and using ad hominem attacks against scientists while 'timidly accepting' evolution.

A review on the pro-evolution website talk.origins, described the book as "...an exposition of the Frontiers of Ignorance" and that within it systems were labeled "irreducibly complex" if Behe was not able to envision a simpler system that still worked. The review also stated that the theory was unfalsifiable (echoing Miller), with faulty logic that worked because Behe did not provide crucial facts that would illustrate its failings. H. Allen Orr has called Behe's argument in the book "...just plain wrong," arguing that gradual adaptation could produce irreducibly complex systems. Orr points to examples of gradual adaptation already known (citing to the work of H. J. Muller in the early 20th century). Behe is also criticized for claiming a conspiracy of silence among scientists regarding the 'failure of Darwinism'.

Richard Dawkins criticized the book for The New York Times as being logically flawed by setting up a false dichotomy in which Darwinian evolution is rejected despite an enormous amount of positive evidence due to a single apparent failure to explain irreducible complexity. Dawkins further commented that it was an argument Darwin himself had anticipated, and he stated that the example of a bacterial flagellum used by Behe had in fact been refuted by Kenneth R. Miller in Kitzmiller v. Dover Area School District. Behe has responded to some of these criticisms. The politically conservative magazine National Review voted Darwin's Black Box one of their top 100 non-fiction books of the century. The panel included George Gilder, a Discovery Institute member.

== Creation ==
In a review of Behe's paper 'Design vs. Randomness in Evolution: Where Do the Data Point?', Denis Lamoureux criticized Darwin's Black Box as having become central to fundamentalist and evangelical anti-evolution critiques against biological evolution. Behe supports the historically incorrect misrepresentation that Darwin's views on the origin of life were atheistic, when On the Origin of Species repeatedly refers to a Creator in a positive and supportive context as impressing laws on matter. Though Behe has avoided committing himself to the view that God intervenes directly in nature to create purportedly irreducibly complex structures, Darwin's Black Box briefly speculates that divine intervention might have caused the direct creation of a cell from which all of life evolved, supporting creationist views of miraculous acts of creation, but ironically echoing Darwin's stated: "view of life, with its several powers, having been originally breathed into a few forms or into one."

Behe's claim that the creation of an original first cell represents a "gap" in the laws of nature needing divine intervention appears to be the problematic God of the gaps position which is subject to the gaps being filled by scientific discoveries.

Behe's thesis that irreducible structures are created in "one fell swoop" is opposed by other biochemists, including many who are devout Christians, and has no support from the fossil record.

== Peer review controversy ==
In 2005, while testifying for the defense in the Dover trial, Behe claimed under oath that the book had received a more thorough peer review than a scholarly article in a refereed journal, a claim which appears to conflict the facts of the book's peer review. Four of the book's five reviewers (Michael Atchison, Robert Shapiro, K. John Morrow, and Russell Doolittle) have made statements that contradict or otherwise do not support Behe's claim of the book passing a rigorous peer review.

=== Michael Atchison ===
Atchison has stated that he did not review the book at all, but spent 10 minutes on the phone receiving a brief overview of the book which he then endorsed without ever seeing the text.

=== Robert Shapiro ===
Robert Shapiro: Shapiro has said that he reviewed the book, and while he agreed with some of its analysis of origin-of-life research, he thought its conclusions are false, though the best explanation of the argument from design that was available. Had the book been submitted to a peer-reviewed journal and this comment had appeared, the review provided by Shapiro would have forced the conclusions regarding intelligent design to be changed or removed.

=== K. John Morrow ===
Morrow criticized the book as appalling and unsupported, which contributed to the original publisher turning down the book for publication.

=== Russell Doolittle ===
Russell Doolittle, upon whom Behe based much of his discussion of blood clotting, described it as misrepresenting a simplified explanation he had given in a lecture, and presenting a fallacious creationist miscalculation of improbability by omitting known options, which also contributed to the original publisher turning down the book for publication.

In the same trial, Behe eventually testified under oath that "There are no peer-reviewed articles by anyone advocating for intelligent design supported by pertinent experiments or calculations which provide detailed rigorous accounts of how intelligent design of any biological system occurred." The result of the trial was the ruling that intelligent design is not science and is essentially religious in nature.
