= Blurb =

Short promotional written piece accompanying a creative work

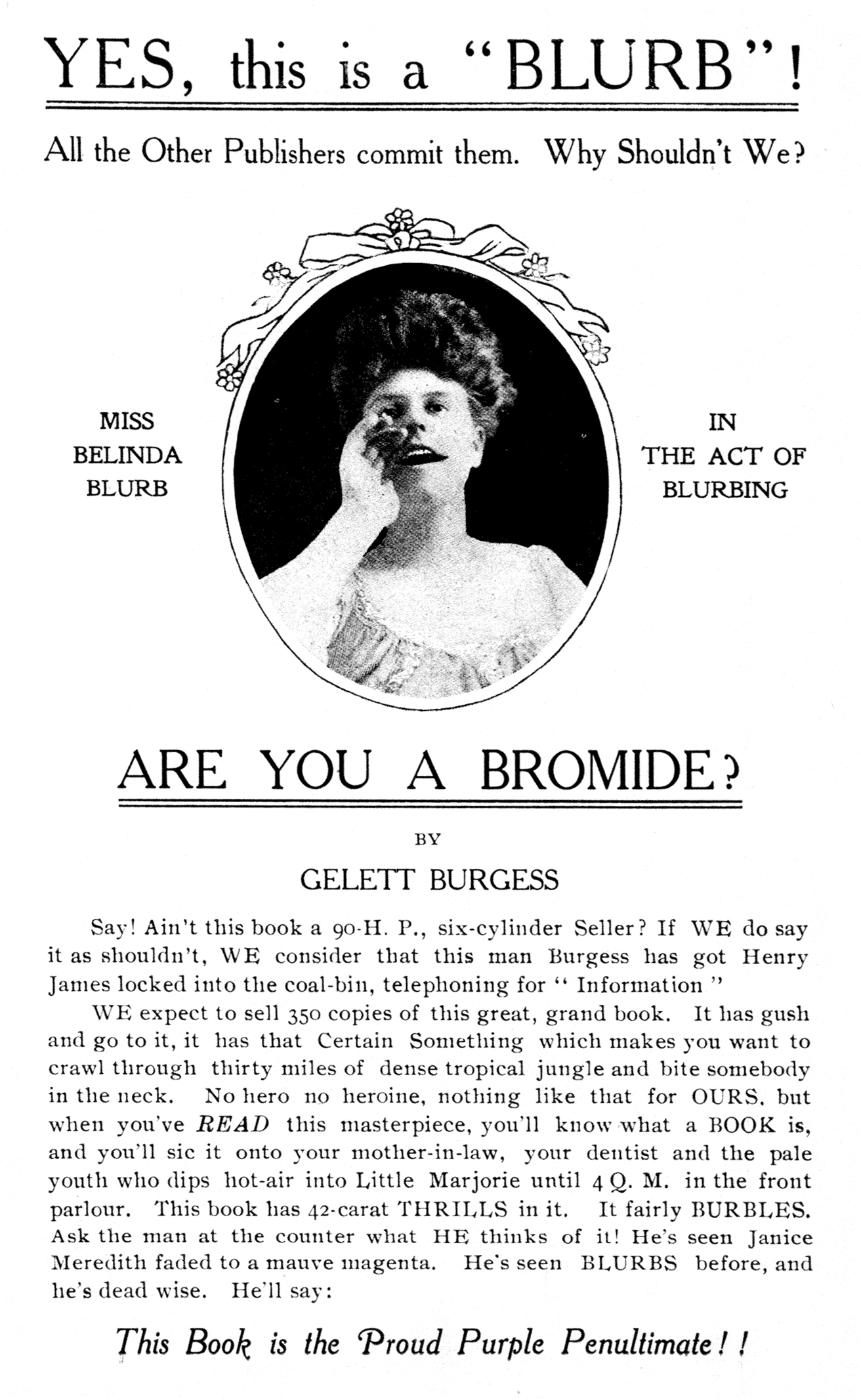
The 1906 front dust jacket of Burgess's Are You a Bromide?, which contains the first use of the word "blurb."

A blurb is a short promotional piece accompanying a piece of creative work. It may be written by the author or publisher or quote praise from others. Blurbs were originally printed on the back or rear dust jacket of a book. With the development of the mass-market paperback, they were placed on both covers by most publishers. Now they are also found on web portals and news websites. A blurb may introduce a newspaper or a book.

== History ==
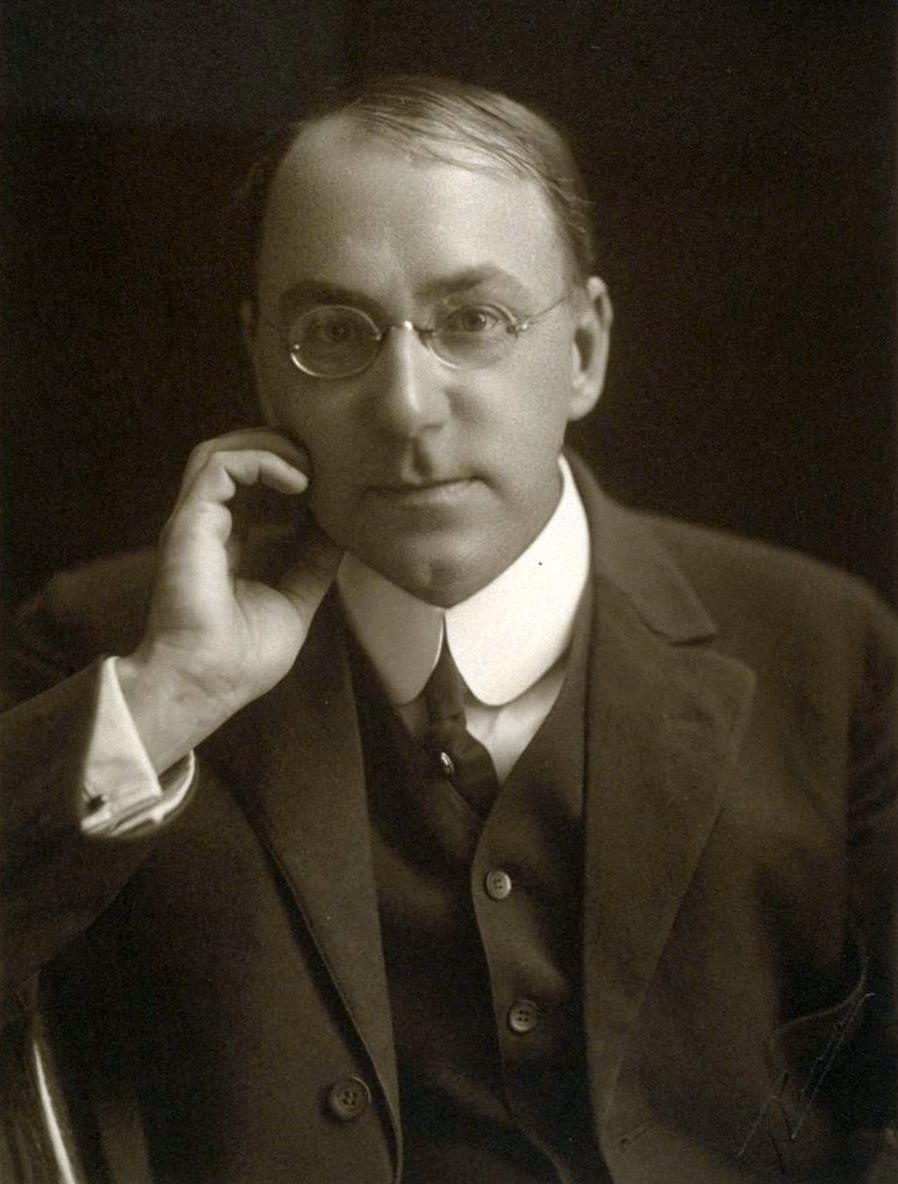
Gelett Burgess c. 1910

In the US, the history of the blurb is said to begin with Walt Whitman's collection, Leaves of Grass. In response to the publication of the first edition in 1855, Ralph Waldo Emerson sent Whitman a congratulatory letter, including the phrase "I greet you at the beginning of a great career": the following year, Whitman had these words stamped in gold leaf on the spine of the second edition.

The word blurb was coined in 1906 by American humorist Gelett Burgess (1866–1951). The October 1906 first edition of his short book Are You a Bromide? was presented in a limited edition to an annual trade association dinner. The custom at such events was to have a dust jacket promoting the work and with, as Burgess' publisher B. W. Huebsch described it, "the picture of a damsel—languishing, heroic, or coquettish—anyhow, a damsel on the jacket of every novel".

In this case, the jacket proclaimed "YES, this is a 'BLURB'!" and the picture was of a (fictitious) young woman "Miss Belinda Blurb" shown calling out, described as "in the act of blurbing." The name and term stuck for any publisher's contents on a book's back cover, even after the picture was dropped and only the text remained.

== Books ==
A blurb on a book can be any combination of quotes from the work, the author, the publisher, reviews or fans; a summary of the plot; a biography of the author; or simply claims about the importance of the work.

In the 1980s, Spy ran a regular feature called "Logrolling in Our Time" which exposed writers who wrote blurbs for one another's books.

=== Blurb requests ===
Prominent writers can receive large volumes of blurb requests from aspiring authors. This has led some writers to turn down such requests as a matter of policy. For example, Gary Shteyngart announced in The New Yorker that he would no longer write blurbs, except for certain writers with whom he had a professional or personal connection. Neil Gaiman reports that "Every now and again, I stop doing blurbs.... The hiatus lasts for a year or two, and then I feel guilty or someone asks me at the right time, and I relent." Jacob M. Appel reports that he received fifteen to twenty blurb requests per week and tackles "as many as I can."

In acknowledgement of such concerns, Simon & Schuster announced in 2025 that it would not expect authors to solicit blurbs for their books. The publisher was quoted in The New York Times as saying that the requesting of blurbs "often rewards connections over talent" and that the practice exacts too much time from authors.

== Film ==
Movie blurbs are part of the promotional campaign for films, and usually consist of positive, colorful extracts from published reviews.

Movie blurbs have often been faulted for taking words out of context. The New York Times reported:

Hollywood has become more careful in recent years in the way it wields these quotes. But the blurbing game is also evolving as newspaper film critics disappear and studios become more comfortable quoting Internet bloggers and movie Web sites in their ads, a practice that still leaves plenty of potential for filmgoers to be bamboozled. Luckily for consumers, there is a cavalry: blurb watchdog sites have sprung up and the number of Web sites that aggregate reviews by established critics is steadily climbing. ... Helping to keep studios in line these days are watchdog sites like eFilmCritic.com and The Blurbs, a Web column for Gelf magazine written by Carl Bialik of The Wall Street Journal.

— Brooks Barnes, The New York Times (June 6, 2009)

Chris Beam from Slate wrote in an "Explainer" column:

How much latitude do movie studios have in writing blurbs? A fair amount. There's no official check on running a misleading movie blurb, aside from the usual laws against false advertising. Studios do have to submit advertising materials like newspaper ads and trailers to the Motion Picture Association of America for approval. But the MPAA reviews the ads for their tone and content, not for the accuracy of their citations. ... As a courtesy, studios will often run the new, condensed quote by the critic before sending it to print.

— Chris Beam, Slate (November 25, 2009)

Many examples exist of blurbs used in marketing a film being traceable directly back to the film's marketing team.

== References and sources ==
Sources

- The story of Miss Belinda Blurb at wordorigins.org
- Original dust jacket at the Library of Congress

== Bibliography ==
- John Carter; Nicolas Barker (2004). "Blurb". ABC for Book Collectors (8th ed.). Oak Knoll Press. ISBN 1584561122.
- Blaise Cronin and Kathryn La Barre (2005). "Patterns of puffery: an analysis of non-fiction blurbs". Journal of Librarianship and Information Science. 37. doi:10.1177/0961000605052156. S2CID 40272839. (Includes bibliography)
- "'Riveting!': The Quandary of the Book Blurb", New York Times, March 6, 2012
