= Carl Bialik =

American journalist

- Born: 10 September 1979 (age 47); New York City
- Education: Yale University
- Occupations: Journalist, Editor, Executive, Data scientist
- Employer(s): YouGov, The Wall Street Journal, FiveThirtyEight
- Known for: Research on US politics

Carl Bialik (10 September 1979 – ) is an American journalist and YouGov America's vice president of data science and U.S. politics editor.

Bialik is also known for his work for The Wall Street Journal, FiveThirtyEight, and Yelpblog.

== Biography ==
Bialik is a graduate of the Bronx High School of Science as valedictorian. He is a New York City native.

Bialik graduated with a Bachelors in mathematics and physics from Yale University. He initially became a freelance journalist before working at the Wall Street Journal.

At the Wall Street Journal, Bialik was the creator and writer of the weekly Numbers Guy column, about the use and (particularly) misuse of numbers and statistics in the news and advocacy. It launched in 2005.

He was also the co-writer on the Journal's blog-like Daily Fix column, which billed itself as "a daily look at the best sportswriting on the Web."

His regular column at Gelf, which skewed toward a meta-journalism focus, was Blurb Racket, which pulled back the curtains on the critic quotes in movie and book advertisements, mainly by comparing them directly with the reviews they come from.

He is also the host of the tennis podcast "Thirty Love," in which he interviews various figures from the world of professional tennis including players, coaches, executives, and journalists. Bialik is also a recurring guest on the data-driven tennis podcast, "The Tennis Abstract Podcast." In 2013, Bialik was hired by Nate Silver at FiveThirtyEight.com. At FiveThirtyEight, Bialik wrote on a wide range of subjects, ranging from politics to economics to crime and to sports.

He has also written for The Monitor (Uganda), Media Life Magazine, Yale Alumni Magazine, Arabies Trends, Sports Illustrated, The Yale Herald, Yale Scientific Magazine, CareerBuilder, and Student.com, and has published 5 scientific papers as of 2013.

In 2017 he was named data science editor of Yelp, working on Yelpblog.

In 2021, Bialik became the vice president of data science and U.S. politics editor of YouGov America. He published his first article and survey on the YouGov site in September 2021. At YouGov, Bialik has conducted a large number of surveys in collaboration with larger research studies.
