= MDNA =

MDNA may refer to:

- Mitochondrial DNA (mDNA or mtDNA), the DNA located in organelles called mitochondria
  - Mitochondrial DNA (journal), an academic journal
- MDNA (album), a 2012 album by Madonna
  - The MDNA Tour, the 2012 concert tour by Madonna to promote the album
    - MDNA World Tour (album), the live album and video documenting the tour

== See also ==
- MDMA
- mRNA
