= The Edge of Evolution =

2007 book by Michael Behe

- Cover
- Author: Michael Behe
- Language: English
- Subject: Intelligent design
- Publisher: Free Press
- Publication date: June 5, 2007
- Publication place: United States
- Media type: Print (Hardcover); Audiobook
- Pages: 336
- ISBN: 0-7432-9620-6
- OCLC: 136958644
- Dewey Decimal: 576.8/2 22
- LC Class: QH367.3 .B44 2007

The Edge of Evolution: The Search for the Limits of Darwinism is an intelligent design book by Discovery Institute fellow Michael Behe, published by the Free Press in 2007. Behe argues that while evolution can produce changes within species, there is a limit to the ability of evolution to generate diversity, and this limit (the "edge of evolution") is somewhere between species and orders. On this basis, he says that known evolutionary mechanisms cannot be responsible for all the observed diversification from the last universal ancestor and the intervention of an intelligent designer can adequately account for much of the diversity of life. It is Behe's second intelligent design book, his first being Darwin's Black Box.

While the book has been well received by creationists and non-biologists, reviews by certain scientists, especially those working in the field of biology, have been highly critical of Behe's methods, information and conclusions in the book.

== Contents ==
Behe begins the book with an observation that the theory of evolution consists of a coherent relationship of three related ideas: common descent, natural selection, and random mutation. He continues by stating he believes they are distinct ideas, with implications for the theory as a whole; common descent and natural selection he accepts without question but questions the scope and power of random mutation to produce beneficial mutations that lead to novel, useful structures and processes. He terms "Darwinian evolution" the type of evolution relying on all three of these factors, applies the label "Darwinists" to scientists who hold the view that Darwinian evolution is the only existing form of evolution, and who take exception to intelligent design as well as other theistic and non-theistic complexity theories.

Behe's central assertion regarding Darwinian evolution is that it exists, but that it is better at disturbing existing metabolic pathways (referred to as 'molecular machinery') than making new ones, and therefore plays only a limited role in the development and diversification of life on Earth. He examines the genetic changes undergone by the malaria plasmodium genome and the human genome in response to each other's biological defenses, and identifies that "the situation resembles trench warfare, not an arms race". He contrasts this hemoglobin-destroying, protein pump-compromising "war by attrition" with the "creative process" required to develop complex structures such as the bacterial flagellum as well as stupendously complex systems such as the immune system.

Behe calculates the "edge of evolution"—the point at which Darwinian evolution is no longer an efficacious agent of creative biological change—by taking into account the number of mutations required to "travel" from one genetic state to another, as well as population size for the organism in question. He concludes that purposeful design plays a major role in the development of biological complexity, through the mechanism of producing "non-random mutations", which are then subjected to the sculpting hand of natural selection.

Design that favors the development of intelligent life, argues Behe, is not only demanded by "the most recent findings concerning biological complexity", but also by discoveries in the fields of chemistry (he uses the example of the peculiar, life-supporting structure of water), and of cosmology (referring to the anthropic principle).

Behe argues strongly for common descent of all lifeforms on Earth, including that humans and chimpanzees have a common ancestor. He states that there is such overwhelming evidence for common ancestry that it should not only be obvious, but "trivial". Behe claims that the mutations required for bridging the higher levels of taxonomy are not possible without design, and that this is the "edge of evolution". The argument hinges on the low probability of an organism having two or more simultaneous mutations to yield some advantage for the organism and large numbers of microbial organisms achieving little in the way of evolving new proteins and binding sites.

Behe acknowledges his support for intelligent design represents a minority view within the scientific community, alluding to his awareness of this fact several times in the book. He implies that for this reason, he avoids detailed discussion about the nature of life's designer, and takes deliberate steps to distinguish himself from the Young Earth creationism movement.

== Reviews ==
Reviews by scientists, especially those working in the field of biology, have been highly critical with Behe's methods, information and conclusions being rejected, though some reviews from creationists and some biologists have been more positive.

=== Negative reviews ===
University of Oxford evolutionary biologist Richard Dawkins reviewed the book, concentrating his criticism on Behe's claim that random mutation, rather than nonrandom natural selection, was the driving force behind evolution. He also criticized Behe's claim that no amount of random mutation could bring about the diversity of life in existence today by pointing to several examples of selective breeding. Dawkins also states that Behe had failed to connect with the scientific research on his topic, that Behe's work would not pass the peer-review of a scientific journal and that Behe bypassed the peer-review process by publishing a popular book solely for a public, rather than scientific, audience.

The Edge of Evolution was reviewed, by prominent biologists, in The New Republic, Science and Nature with similar comments—that Behe appears to accept almost all of evolutionary theory, barring random mutation, which is replaced with guided mutation at the hand of an unnamed designer.

Other reviews have criticized Behe for misleading quote mining, failing to offer a theory of intelligent design despite a ten-year gap since Darwin's Black Box, a logical contradiction between design and 'unbroken natural law', an erroneous model and ignoring publications and information that contradicts his theory. Singled out for specific criticism included the use of irrelevant calculations as sources, his assertion of the necessity of simultaneous mutations when evidence supports cumulative mutations, and ignoring the scientific literature on protein evolution.

Michael Ruse, professor of philosophy at Florida State University, found the book to contain no developments beyond what was offered in Darwin's Black Box, repeating arguments, ignoring and dismissing opposing arguments without analysis; comments echoed by others.

Dennis Venema, a Christian biology professor at Trinity Western University and a fellow of the Biologos Foundation, recalls that Behe's book convinced him that Intelligent Design was bad science: "when Behe began to discuss a topic I was familiar with (population genetics) I confirmed what I suspected: Behe was out of his area of specialty and out of his depth."

=== Positive reviews ===
Historian of religion Cameron Wybrow wrote a review of Edge of Evolution published in The Philadelphia Inquirer, stating that the book "provides some hard numbers, coupled with an ingenious argument". Additionally a review in The Christian Post by minister Chuck Colson recommends it, noting "Even if you do not agree with everything in it, as I do not, you do not need to follow the Darwinist line that everything you disagree with must be squashed."

== Responses and scientific criticism ==
Behe has replied to some of his critics on his blog at Amazon.com. Behe's critics have suggested that these responses have sidestepped scientific criticisms

In response to criticism by Abbie Smith and Ian Musgrave, Behe agreed that his claim that HIV had evolved no new protein binding sites was incorrect and that at least one such binding site had evolved on the Vpu viroporin protein but Behe argued that the mistake did not alter the validity of his argument.

On The Panda's Thumb blog Ian Musgrave has stated that the book's "core concept ... that protein–protein binding sites are extremely unlikely to have developed by natural means" is undermined by a recent Science article whose authors were "able to produce strong protein–protein binding in many cases with a single mutation." Musgrave concludes:

Behe greatly overestimates the difficulty of developing a binding site, ignores the fact that the majority of 10,000 binding sites in modern vertebrates are duplicate copies of each other, with there being only a much smaller number of basic binding motifs and ignores the fact that most of these basic binding motifs were developed in rapidly dividing single celled organisms with very large populations.

Far from protein–protein binding pointing to an unknown designer, protein binding sites point directly to descent with modification and the "tinkering" of natural selection.
