= Judaica Foundation – Center For Jewish Culture =

Polish foundation

Coordinates: 50°03′05″N 19°56′39″E

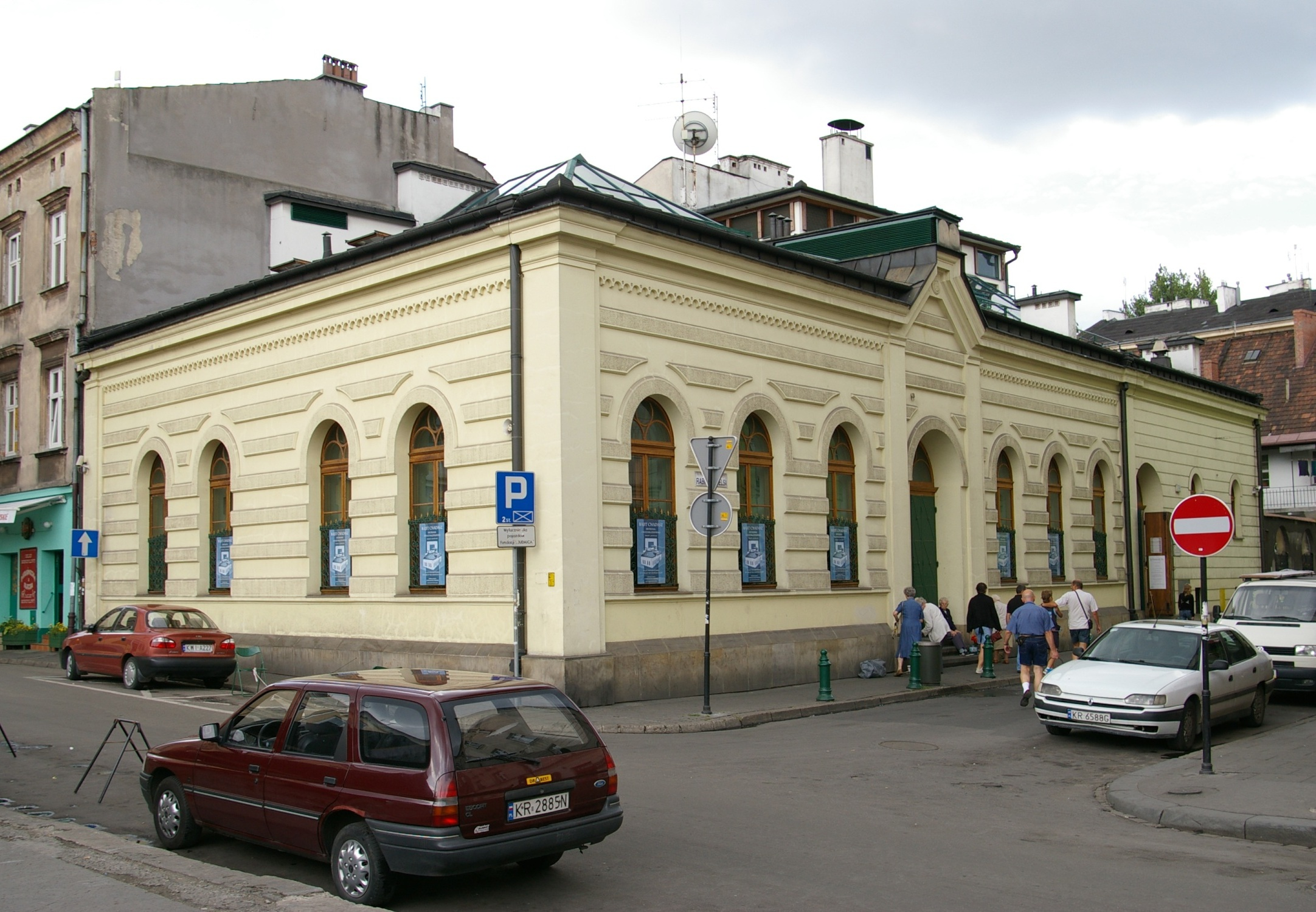
The Judaica Foundation Centre For Jewish Culture, former Bne Emuna Prayerhouse, Kraków

The Judaica Foundation (Polish: Centrum Kultury Żydowskiej) is a foundation located at ul. Meiselsa 17 street in Kraków, Poland, dedicated to preserving the city's Jewish culture. It was created in 1991. The idea for the foundation was established already in the 1980s, influenced by the President of the Jewish community of Kraków. Committed to preserving the Jewish heritage in Kraków's old Jewish district of Kazimierz and to opening up a new platform for intercultural dialogue, the Foundation also aims at spurring interest among young people for the Jewish culture and history.

The Centre for Jewish Culture run by the Judaica Foundation opened in 1993. It resides in Kazimierz at a former house of prayer (Beit Tefillah) built in the 1880s and modernized in 1989–1993. The building served religious purposes right until the outbreak of World War II. In 1993 it was thoroughly restored with the help of various organisations. Today the Centre serves as a venue for lectures, workshops and exhibitions such as the Aleksander and Alicja Hetz Annual Memorial Lecture or the Settimana della Cultura Ebraica which is organised together with the Italian Institute for Culture in Kraków.

== See also ==
- Synagogues of Kraków
- Stanisław Musiał

== Sources ==
Judaica.pl
