= Joseph Thornton (biologist) =

American biologist (born 1965)

Joe Thornton
- Born: Chicago, IL
- Citizenship: United States
- Education: Yale University, Columbia University
- Known for: his work on molecular evolution
- Awards: NCSE Friend of Darwin Award (2019), U.S. Presidential Early Career Award for Scientists and Engineers (2007), Howard Hughes Medical Institute Early Career Scientist Award (2009), National Science Foundation (2006)
- Scientific career
- Fields: Evolutionary biology
- Workplaces: University of Oregon, University of Chicago

Joseph (Joe) Thornton (born 1965) is an American biologist. He is a professor at the University of Chicago and a former Early Career Scientist of the Howard Hughes Medical Institute. He is known for resurrecting ancestral genes and tracing the mechanisms by which proteins evolve new functions.

His work has been discussed in arguments concerning intelligent design and "irreducible complexity." It has also been featured in popular discussions of the contingency of evolution.

Thornton has received the U.S. Presidential Early Career Award for Scientists and Engineers at the White House, as well as a Career Award from the National Science Foundation and an Early Career Scientist Award from the Howard Hughes Medical Institute.

Thornton's background and career were profiled in an article in the journal Nature, which focused on his unusual path into science, including undergraduate study as an English major and several years as an environmental activist working for Greenpeace. In 2026 he was elected to the National Academy of Sciences.
