= Russell Doolittle =

American biochemist (1931–2019)

Department of Chemistry and Biochemistry, UC San Diego

Russell F. Doolittle (January 10, 1931 – October 11, 2019) was an American biochemist who taught at the University of California, San Diego (UCSD). Described as a "world-renowned evolutionary biologist", Doolittle's research primarily focused on the structure and evolution of proteins. Highlights of Doolittle's decades of research include his role in co-developing the hydropathy index and determining the structure of fibrinogen.

== Early life and education ==
Doolittle was born on January 10, 1931, in New Haven, Connecticut. Doolittle earned a B.A. in biology from Wesleyan University in 1952, and an M.A. in education from Trinity College in 1957. He earned his Ph.D. in biochemistry at Harvard University in 1962 with research in blood clotting. Doolittle later conducted postdoctoral research in Sweden funded by the National Institutes of Health (NIH).

== Career ==
Doolittle notably co-developed the hydropathy index, and was instrumental in determining the structure of fibrinogen. Dootlittle was a member of the National Academy of Sciences from 1984, was a Guggenheim Fellow and was a co-recipient of the Paul Ehrlich Prize.

In 1985, Doolittle was elected a Fellow of the American Academy of Arts and Sciences in 1985. In 1992, he was elected to the American Philosophical Society. In addition, Doolittle calculated the date of the divergence of all life forms from a common ancestor. In 2006, Doolittle was awarded the John J. Carty Award from the National Academy of Sciences for his professional achievements.

=== Personal views ===
Doolittle was a critic of creationism and intelligent design (ID), and accused Michael Behe, an ID proponent, of misquoting his work. In 1981, Doolittle debated ID proponent Duane Gish on live television. In 2016, three years before is death, Doolittle signed onto an open letter urging world leaders to take the threat of climate change seriously.

== Death and legacy ==
Doolittle died in La Jolla on October 11, 2019, at the age of 88. Molecular biologist Kenneth R. Miller praised Doolittle's contributions to science, stating he regards Doolittle "as the very epitome of a humane life in science".

== Books ==
- Russell F. Doolittle, Of Urfs and Orfs: A Primer on how to Analyze Derived Amino Acid Sequences. (University Science Books, December 1986) ISBN 0-935702-54-7
- Russell F. Doolittle, John N. Abelson, and Melvin I. Simon, Computer Methods for Macromolecular Sequence Analysis (Methods in Enzymology) (Academic Press, 1996) ISBN 0-12-182167-6
- Russell F. Doolittle, The Evolution of Vertebrate Blood Clotting (University Science Books, August 2012) ISBN 978-1-891389-81-8
- John N. Abelson, Melvin I. Simon, and Russell F. Doolittle, Molecular Evolution: Computer Analysis of Protein and Nucleic Acid Sequences, Volume 183: Volume 183: Molecular Evolution (Methods in Enzymology) (Academic Press, Feb 28, 1990) ISBN 0-12-182084-X
- Mosesson, Michael W. and Doolittle, Russell F. Molecular biology of fibrinogen and fibrin (Annals of the New York Academy of Sciences) (New York Academy of Sciences, 1983) ISBN 0-89766-209-1
