= Student.com =

- Screenshot Student.com Screenshot
- Company type: Private
- Founded: 2011
- Area served: Worldwide
- Founders: Luke Nolan, Shakil Khan, JP Jones
- CEO: Luke Nolan
- Industry: Real estate, Accommodation, Travel
- Employees: 200
- Website: student.com

Student.com is a student accommodation marketplace that tries to help students find residential accommodations. The company operates focusing on the student accommodation market, by connecting students to landlords; highlighted in a niche in the property market. Student.com was founded by Luke Nolan in 2011 with Shakil Khan and John-Paul Jones joining in 2014. The company is headquartered in Dubai, with offices in the UK, China, Hong Kong, USA, Australia and India.

== Company history ==
=== Inception ===
The company was initially founded in 2011 as Overseas Student Living by Luke Nolan. After working in China for several years, Nolan was regularly called upon by his Chinese friends to help recommend accommodation for students looking to study in the US, UK and Australia. Recognizing that many other individuals, especially students, were facing similar issues, Nolan realized that there was a potential market for an online student accommodation marketplace that could help in connecting students with trusted professional landlords for their accommodation needs. In 2014, he was joined by other co-founders Shakil Khan, who met Nolan 10-years earlier in Shanghai, and John-Paul Jones. The company rebranded itself as Student.com in 2015 to focus on expanding globally and hired a team of multilingual booking agents.

=== Growth and funding ===
In 2015, the company saw $110 million in bookings, listed properties in 426 cities in proximity to 1,000 universities. The company raised combined Series B and C funding of $60 million in 2016 led by VY Capital, Horizons Ventures, Expa, Spotify founders Daniel Ek and Martin Lorentzon, and Hugo Barra of Xiaomi.

== Products and features ==
The listings on Student.com are displayed on an interactive map subdivided by different neighborhoods. The platform claim to help in the accommodation search for international students needing to secure a base for their studies from a distance. The website assigns the user to a booking consultant, who contacts the student to verify their details, including choice of room, roommate, tenancy length, price and student status. The service is free for students and it takes its commission as a cut from bookings. In April 2016, Forbes revealed that billionaire investor, Jim Breyer invested an undisclosed amount in Student.com.
