= Access Research Network =

American non-profit advocating intelligent design

Access Research Network (ARN) is an American non-profit organization that reports on science, technology and society from an intelligent design perspective. ARN primarily disseminates information via its website, located at ARN.org, which contains commentary, articles (both original and from other sources), videos, links, and a bookstore, all focusing on intelligent design. Between 2006 and 2011, ARN also published an annual list of "Top 10 Darwin and Design News Stories" compiled by ARN staff and released at the end of each year.

== History ==
SOR was founded in 1977 by a group of students at the University of California at Santa Barbara as a scientific alternative to both the Young Earth creationist Institute for Creation Research and the neo-darwininian paradigm. It did not require adherence to scriptural authority and a specific model as to the age of the Earth, potentially avoiding the chronic conflicts that this produced with the scientific community, and hoped to foster a relationship of dialogue rather than debate.

It acts as a de facto auxiliary website to the Discovery Institute's Center for Science and Culture (CSC) in promoting intelligent design (ID), and has become a comprehensive clearinghouse for ID resources, including news releases, publications, multimedia products and an elementary school science curriculum. Its mission is "providing accessible information on science, technology and society issues from an intelligent design perspective." Its directors are Dennis Wagner (Executive Director) and CSC Fellows Mark Hartwig, Stephen C. Meyer and Paul Nelson.

The group's publication includes subjects such as genetic engineering, euthanasia, computer technology, environmental issues, evolution, fetal tissue research, and AIDS. It published a journal Origins & Design, but this has been moribund since 2001.
