= S. Joshua Swamidass =

American academic

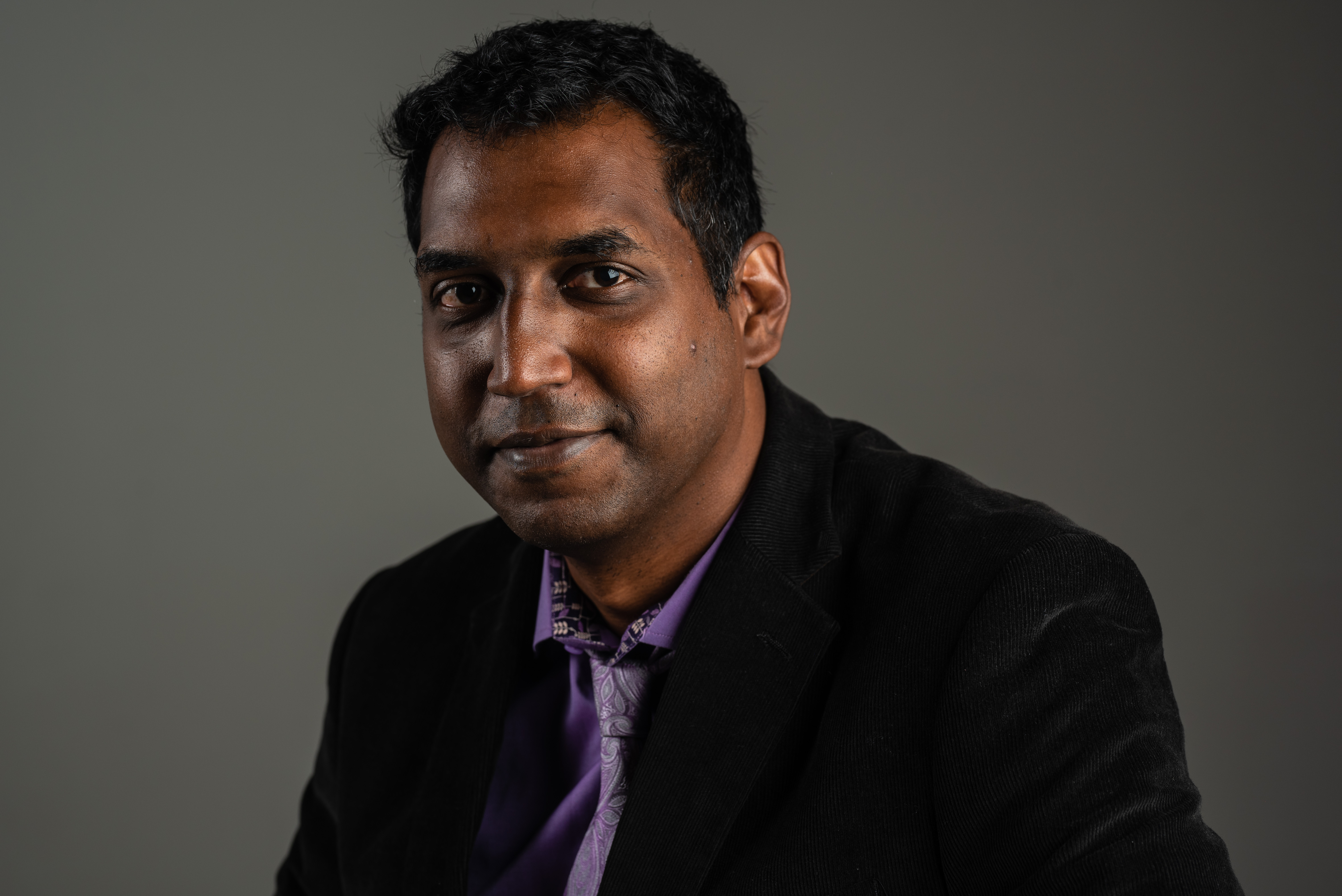
- Occupations: Computational biologist, physician, and academic

Academic background
- Education: B.S., Biological Sciences; M.S., Information and Computer Sciences; Ph.D., Information and Computer Sciences; M.D.
- Alma mater: University of California, Irvine; Washington University in St. Louis

Academic work
- Institutions: Washington University School of Medicine

S. Joshua Swamidass is an American computational biologist, physician, academic, and author. He is an associate professor of Laboratory and Genomic Medicine, and a Faculty Lead of Translational Bioinformatics in the Institute for Informatics at Washington University in St. Louis.

Swamidass has published over 150 articles. He focuses his research on applications of statistical machine learning and decision theory in the context of chemical biology and medicine. He has also worked on drug discovery, drug metabolism, and translational research. Swamidass is the founder of "Peaceful Science," where he writes regarding the advancement of the civic practice of science. He also serves as an Associate Editor for BMC Medical Informatics and Decision Making. In 2019 he published The Genealogical Adam and Eve.

In 2022, Swamidass became a fellow of the American Academy for Advancement of Science.

== Education ==
Swamidass studied at the University of California, Irvine, and received his bachelor's degree in Biological Sciences in 2000, and master's degree and Doctoral degree in Information and Computer Sciences in 2006 and 2007, respectively. In 2009, he earned his Medical Doctorate degree and subsequently joined Washington University in St. Louis to complete his Clinical Pathology Residency.

== Career ==
Swamidass held appointment as an instructor in the Department of Immunology and Pathology at Washington University School of Medicine in 2010, and was promoted to the position of assistant professor of Laboratory and Genomic Medicine in 2011. He has been serving as a Faculty Lead of Translational Bioinformatics since 2017, and as associate professor of Laboratory and Genomic Medicine since 2018.

== Research ==
Swamidass' research primarily focuses on artificial intelligence applied to scientific problems at the intersection of medicine, biology, and chemistry. His works in the field has been featured in WIRED and The Wall Street Journal.

=== Chemical Informatics ===
In his studies of chemical informatics, Swamidass introduced three new kernels: Tanimoto, MinMax, and Hybrid, based on the idea of molecular fingerprints. He studied the properties and tradeoffs of these kernels, and also discussed their applications in terms of predicting mutagenicity, toxicity, and anti-cancer activity on three publicly available data sets. In 2013, he demonstrated that artificial intelligence algorithms can predict metabolic transformations of xenobiotic molecules, and highlighted the role of these processes in the safety, efficacy, and dose of medicines. He also developed and explored algorithms regarding fast exact searches of chemical fingerprints in linear and sub-linear time. He, along with co-authors developed a novel screening method, Influence Relevance Voter (IRV), and provided its advantages over other SVMs and other methods. Moreover, he focused his study to highlight opportunities and obstacles for deep learning in biology and medicine.

=== Drug Metabolism ===
Swamidass studied drug metabolism, described its impacts in the context of patient morbidity and mortality, and provided new directions such as joint metabolism and reactivity modeling. While focusing on open source drug discovery with the malaria box, he suggested mechanisms of action for the compounds active in killing multiple life-cycle stages of the malaria parasite, and also defined the processes to catalyze drug discovery for dozens of different indications.

=== The Genealogical Adam and Eve ===
Swamidass published The Genealogical Adam and Eve: The Surprising Science of Universal Ancestry in 2019 based on implications of recent universal genealogical ancestry regarding the theology of the image of God, the fall, and people outside the garden. The appendix includes Swamidass' work The Resurrection, Evidence, and The Scientist, which discusses his reasons for belief in the resurrection of Jesus. In his interview with "BibleProject Podcast", he discussed the differences between genealogical ancestry and genetic ancestry, and explored the conflict that exists between evolutionary science and creationism. Furthermore, he stated "The genealogical account does not prove [Adam and Eve's existence], but it's impossible to disprove the existence of such a couple 6,000 years ago." Anjeanette Roberts praised Swamidass' work and stated that in his book the emphasis on "genealogical ancestry is so clearly biblical that its long-term absence in evangelical conversations about human origins is shocking" and the work also helps to remove "the enmity and barriers that divide scientists, theologians, exegetes, evolutionists, and creationists." Nathan H. Lents thought the book's "bold attempt" to find a place for Adam and Eve within the scientific understanding of human ancestry might help reconcile evangelicals to evolutionary science, and science in general, but thought it unlikely to persuade scientists of a role for the Genesis narrative in human origins.

== Bibliography ==
=== Books ===
- Swamidass, S. Joshua (2019). The Genealogical Adam and Eve: The Surprising Science of Universal Ancestry. InterVarsity Press: Downers Grove, Illinois. ISBN 978-0-8308-5263-5. OCLC 1122690459.

=== Selected articles ===
- Swamidass, S. J., Chen, J., Bruand, J., Phung, P., Ralaivola, L., & Baldi, P. (2005). Kernels for small molecules and the prediction of mutagenicity, toxicity and anti-cancer activity. Bioinformatics, 21(suppl_1), i359-i368.
- Ralaivola, L., Swamidass, S. J., Saigo, H., & Baldi, P. (2005). Graph kernels for chemical informatics. Neural networks, 18(8), 1093–1110.
- Li, J., Zheng, S., Chen, B., Butte, A. J., Swamidass, S. J., & Lu, Z. (2016). A survey of current trends in computational drug repositioning. Briefings in bioinformatics, 17(1), 2–12.
- Ching, T., Himmelstein, D. S., Beaulieu-Jones, B. K., Kalinin, A. A., Do, B. T., Way, G. P., ... & Greene, C. S. (2018). Opportunities and obstacles for deep learning in biology and medicine. Journal of The Royal Society Interface, 15(141), 20170387.
