= Mitochondrial DNA (journal) =

- Discipline: CellBiology/Genetics/Evolution
- Language: English
- Edited by: Rob DeSalle

Publication details
- History: First published 1990
- Publisher: Informa Healthcare (UK)
- Frequency: Bimonthly
- Open access: no
- Impact factor: 1.760 (2015)

Standard abbreviations
- ISO 4: Mitochondrial DNA

Indexing
- ISSN: 1940-1736 (print); 1940-1744 (web)

Links
- Journal homepage

Mitochondrial DNA is an academic journal that publishes review articles on the current and developing technologies around mitochondrial DNA research and discovery. It is published by Informa Healthcare.

== Core areas ==
Coverage includes:

- Discovery and description of mitochondrial genome sequences
- Structure and function of mtDNA genes and genomic features
- Molecular evolution, phylogenetics, population genetics
- Model and non-model organisms
- Endangered species
- Neurodegenerative disorders
- Ageing
- Current technologies
- Bioinformatics

== Aims and scope ==
Previously published under the title DNA Sequence (Vols 1–19.3), Mitochondrial DNA accepts original high-quality reports based on mapping, sequencing and analysis of mitochondrial DNA and RNA. Descriptive papers on DNA sequences from mitochondrial genomes, and also analytical papers in the areas of population genetics, medical genetics, phylogenetics and human evolution that use mitochondrial DNA as a source of evidence for studies will be considered for publication. The editorial board will also consider manuscripts that examine population genetic and systematic theory that specifically address the use of mitochondrial DNA sequences, as well as papers that discuss the utility of mitochondrial DNA information in medical studies and in human evolutionary biology.

== Editor-in-chief ==
Rob DeSalle (American Museum of Natural History) is the editor-in-chief of Mitochondrial DNA.

Questions about the journal can be addressed to both the editor-in-chief and the managing editor, Sergios-Orestis Kolokotronis (Barnard College, Columbia University).

== Special issues ==
Mitochondrial DNA has published so far two special free-access issues on DNA Barcoding:

- Mexican Barcode of Life (MexBOL) in December 2010
- Fish Barcode of Life (FishBOL) in October 2011

== Publication format ==
Mitochondrial DNA publishes WebFirst—a method of publishing where a journal is made available as multiple online issues throughout the year, with a single print archive copy of the entire volume being published at the end of the year. Access to the online version is included in all subscriptions.

== Abstracting and indexing ==
Mitochondrial DNA is abstracted in: Current Contents/Life Sciences; Science Citation Index; Research Alert; Current Awareness in Biological Science (CABS); Chemical Abstracts; Index Medicus; MEDLINE; GenBank; Scopus; Zoological Record.
