= Jesuit University of Philosophy and Education Ignatianum =

Coordinates: 50°3′45.65″N 19°56′56″E

Ignatianum University in Cracow
- Former names: Seminarium Cracoviense Societatis Jesu (1867-1932); Facultas Philosophiae Societatis Jesu (1932-1999); Jesuit University of Philosophy and Education Ignatianum (1999-2011); Jesuit University Ignatianum in Krakow (2011-2023)
- Motto: Ad Maiorem Dei Gloriam
- Type: Private Roman Catholic Research Non-profit Coeducational Higher education institution
- Established: 1932; 94 years ago
- Religious affiliation: Roman Catholic (Jesuit)
Academic affiliations
| IAJU; ECArTE; FUCE | IFCU; HEST; SCRIBANI |
- Rector: dr hab. Tomasz Homa SJ, prof. UIK
- Students: 3,040 (12.2023)
- Location: ul. Kopernika 26, 31-501 Kraków, Poland
- Website: ignatianum.edu.pl

Ignatianum University in Cracow (formerly Jesuit University Ignatianum in Krakow) is a Catholic higher education institution run by the Society of Jesus in Kraków, Poland. It is officially recognized by the state of Poland. It offers BA, MA, and PhD studies in 14 academic disciplines, such as psychology, pedagogy, and philosophy. It also has its own publishing house (Ignatianum University Press) which publishes 8 academic journals.

== History ==
Ignatianum traces its roots back to 1867 when the didactic-academic center Seminarium Cracoviense Societatis Jesu was established in Kraków. In 1932 the Faculty of Philosophy of the Society of Jesus in Kraków received the rights of a Catholic school of university standing. In 1989, after social changes in Poland, it was possible for Jesuits to set up Ignatianum, a legal status Papal University. It has faculties of philosophy and education conferring MA degrees, as well as the PhD in philosophy, through agreement between the Government and the Catholic bishops in Poland.

In October 1989 the Religious Culture Institute was established, a two-year philosophical and theological program of studies for lay people, and in 1990 the religious pedagogy department for training lay teachers of religious education. On October 1, 2011 the name of the school was changed from Jesuit University of Philosophy and Education Ignatianum to Jesuit University Ignatianum. Since 2012, the Ignatianum has conferred the PhD in Humanities within the discipline of cultural studies and philosophy. In October 2023 it was promoted to university, and changed its name to Ignatianum University in Cracow.

The philosophy department offers majors in philosophy, cultural studies, psychology, and journalism and public communication. The education department offers majors in pedagogy, political studies, social work, administration and public policy, and English philology. Full-time studies can be pursued through the web.

== Further offerings ==
In its University of the Third Age Ignatianum offers courses to the 50-and-over group, to help them contribute to society in their advancing years. There is also an academy for children.

Since 1973 Ignatianum has published books and 6 academic journals: two annuals – Yearbook of the Faculty of Philosophy and Yearbook of the Faculty of Education – and three twice-yearly journals – Philosophical Forums, Perspectives of Culture, and Horizons of Education – along with Horizons of Politics. The Jesuit library on site has over 400,000 volumes and more than 500 magazines (170 foreign); there is a modern reading room. Catalogues of the library are computerized and accessible on the Internet. The academic staff at the University includes 244 teachers and research scholars. There are 3730 students.

== See also ==
- List of Jesuit sites
