= Quoting out of context =

Informal fallacy

Quoting out of context (sometimes referred to as contextomy or quote mining) is an informal fallacy in which a passage is removed from its surrounding matter in such a way as to distort its intended meaning. Context may be omitted intentionally or accidentally, thinking it to be non-essential. As a fallacy, quoting out of context differs from false attribution, in that the out of context quote is still attributed to the correct source. Also described as selective quoting, the practice alters the apparent sense of a statement by omitting the surrounding material that qualifies it.

Arguments based on this fallacy typically take two forms:

1. As a straw man argument, it involves quoting an opponent out of context in order to misrepresent their position (typically to make it seem more simplistic or extreme) in order to make it easier to refute. It is common in politics.
2. As an appeal to authority, it involves quoting an authority on the subject out of context, in order to misrepresent that authority as supporting some position.

== Contextomy ==
Contextomy refers to the selective excerpting of words from their original linguistic context in a way that distorts the source's intended meaning, a practice commonly referred to as "quoting out of context". The problem here is not the removal of a quote from its original context per se (as all quotes are), but to the quoter's decision to exclude from the excerpt certain nearby phrases or sentences (which become "context" by virtue of the exclusion) that serve to clarify the intentions behind the selected words. Comparing this practice to surgical excision, journalist Milton Mayer coined the term "contextomy" to describe its use by Julius Streicher, editor of the infamous Nazi broadsheet Der Stürmer in Weimar-era Germany. To arouse antisemitic sentiments among the weekly's working class Christian readership, Streicher regularly published truncated quotations from Talmudic texts that, in their shortened form, appear to advocate greed, slavery, and ritualistic murder. Although rarely employed to this malicious extreme, contextomy is a common method of misrepresentation in contemporary mass media, and studies have demonstrated that the effects of this misrepresentation can linger even after the audience is exposed to the original, in context, quote.

=== In advertising ===
One of the most familiar examples of contextomy is the ubiquitous "review blurb" in advertising. The lure of media exposure associated with being "blurbed" by a major studio may encourage some critics to write positive reviews of mediocre movies. However, even when a review is negative overall, studios have few reservations about excerpting it in a way that misrepresents the critic's opinion.

For example, the ad copy for New Line Cinema's 1995 thriller Se7en attributed to Owen Gleiberman, a critic for Entertainment Weekly, used the comment "a small masterpiece." Gleiberman actually gave Se7en a B− overall and only praised the opening credits so grandiosely: "The credit sequence, with its jumpy frames and near-subliminal flashes of psychoparaphernalia, is a small masterpiece of dementia." Similarly, United Artists contextomized critic Kenneth Turan's review of their flop Hoodlum, including just one word from it—"irresistible"—in the film's ad copy: "Even Laurence Fishburne's incendiary performance can't ignite Hoodlum, a would-be gangster epic that generates less heat than a nickel cigar. Fishburne's 'Bumpy' is fierce, magnetic, irresistible even… But even this actor can only do so much." As a result of these abuses, some critics now deliberately avoid colorful language in their reviews. In 2010, the pop culture magazine Vanity Fair reported that it had been the victim of "reckless blurbing" after the television show Lost had taken a review fragment of "the most confusing, asinine, ridiculous—yet somehow addictively awesome—television show of all time" and only quoted "the most addictively awesome television show of all time" in its promotional material. Carl Bialik recorded an instance of an adverb being applied to a different verb in a 2007 advert for Live Free or Die Hard, where a New York Daily News quote of "hysterically overproduced and surprisingly entertaining" was reduced to "hysterically... entertaining".

In the United States, there is no specific law against misleading movie blurbs, beyond existing regulation over false advertising. The MPAA reviews advertisements for tone and content rather than the accuracy of their citations. Some studios seek approval from the original critic before running a condensed quotation. The European Union's Unfair Commercial Practices Directive prohibits contextomy, and targets companies who "falsely claim accreditation" for their products in ways that are "not being true to the terms of the [original] endorsement". It is enforced in the United Kingdom by the Office of Fair Trading, and carries a maximum penalty of a £5,000 fine or two years imprisonment.

=== In academia ===
Within the creation–evolution controversy, the term is used by members of the scientific community to describe a method employed by creationists to support their arguments, though it can be and often is used outside of the creation–evolution controversy. Complaints about the practice predate known use of the term: Theodosius Dobzhansky wrote in his famous 1973 essay "Nothing in Biology Makes Sense Except in the Light of Evolution":

Their [Creationists'] favorite sport is stringing together quotations, carefully and sometimes expertly taken out of context, to show that nothing is really established or agreed upon among evolutionists. Some of my colleagues and myself have been amused and amazed to read ourselves quoted in a way showing that we are really antievolutionists under the skin.

Analysis of the evidence submitted by the British Homeopathic Association to the House of Commons Evidence Check on Homeopathy contains many examples of quote mining, where the conclusions of scientific papers were selectively quoted to make them appear to support the efficacy of homeopathic treatment. For example, one paper's conclusion was reported as "There is some evidence that homeopathic treatments are more effective than placebo" without the immediately following caveat "however, the strength of this evidence is low because of the low methodological quality of the trials. Studies of high methodological quality were more likely to be negative than the lower quality studies."

A book review in The New York Times recounts Lerone Bennett Jr.'s "distortion by omission" in citing a letter from Abraham Lincoln as evidence that he "did not openly oppose the anti-immigrant Know-Nothing Party" because, as Lincoln explained, "they are mostly my old political and personal friends", while omitting to mention that the remainder of the letter describes Lincoln's break with these former Whig Party associates of his, and his anticipation of "painful necessity of my taking an open stand against them."

== See also ==
- Cherry picking
- Expelled: No Intelligence Allowed § Charles Darwin quotation issue
- FactCheck.org
- Half-truth
- Prooftext
- Recontextualization
