= List of popular science books on evolution =

This is a list of popular science books concerning evolution, sorted by surname of the author.

== B ==
- Paul M. Bingham and Joanne Souza (2009). Death from a Distance and the Birth of a Humane Universe: Human Evolution, Behavior, History, and Your Future.

== C ==
- Sean B. Carroll (2006). The Making of the Fittest: DNA and the Ultimate Forensic Record of Evolution.
- Sean B. Carroll (2005). Endless Forms Most Beautiful: The New Science of Evo Devo.
- Brian Charlesworth and Deborah Charlesworth (2003). Evolution: A Very Short Introduction.
- Matteo Conti (2008). The Selfish Cell: An evolutionary defeat.
- Jerry Coyne (2009). Why Evolution Is True.

== D ==
- Charles Darwin (1859). The Origin of Species.
- Charles Darwin (1871). The Descent of Man.
- Richard Dawkins (1976). The Selfish Gene.
- Richard Dawkins (1982). The Extended Phenotype.
- Richard Dawkins (1986). The Blind Watchmaker.
- Richard Dawkins (1995). River out of Eden.
- Richard Dawkins (1996). Climbing Mount Improbable.
- Richard Dawkins (2004). The Ancestor's Tale.
- Richard Dawkins (2009). The Greatest Show on Earth: The Evidence for Evolution.
- Daniel Dennett (1995). Darwin's Dangerous Idea.
- Daniel Dennett (2003). Freedom Evolves.
- Jared Diamond (1991). The Third Chimpanzee: The Evolution and Future of the Human Animal
- Theodosius Dobzhansky (1937; 2nd ed 1941; 3rd ed 1951). Genetics and the Origin of Species.

== E ==
- Niles Eldredge (2001). The Triumph of Evolution: and the Failure of Creationism.

== F ==
- Daniel J. Fairbanks (2007). Relics of Eden: The Powerful Evidence of Evolution in Human DNA.

== G ==
- Ann Gibbons (2007). The First Human: The Race to Discover Our Earliest Ancestors.
- Stephen Jay Gould (1977). Ever Since Darwin.
- Stephen Jay Gould (1989). Wonderful Life: The Burgess Shale and the Nature of History.
- Stephen Jay Gould (1996). Full House: The Spread of Excellence from Plato to Darwin.

== H ==
- Marc Hauser (2006). Moral Minds.
- Jay Hosler (2011). Evolution: The Story of Life on Earth.
- Julian Huxley (1942). Evolution: The Modern Synthesis.
- Thomas Henry Huxley (1863). Evidence as to Man's Place in Nature.

== J ==
- Donald Johansson (2006). From Lucy to Language: Revised, Updated, and Expanded.
- Shaun Johnston (2017). Re-thinking What it Means We Evolved: A new framework for universal moral values.
- Shaun Johnston (2020). Are You wonderful? Good Science Says, Yes: How to tell good science from bad.
- Alison Jolly (2001). Lucy's Legacy: Sex and Intelligence in Human Evolution.
- Steve Jones (1995). The Language of the Genes.
- David Starr Jordan (1901). The Blood of the Nation: A Study in the Decay of Races by the Survival of the Unfit.
- Joseph Jordania (2006). Who Asked the First Question?: The Origins of Human Choral Singing, Intelligence, Language and Speech.
- Joseph Jordania (2011). Why do People Sing? Music in Human Evolution.

== K ==
- Marc W. Kirschner and John C. Gerhart (2006). The Plausibility of Life: Resolving Darwin's Dilemma.
- Peter Kropotkin (1902). Mutual Aid: A Factor of Evolution.
- Arik Kershenbaum (2020). The Zoologist's Guide to the Galaxy - What Animals on Earth Reveal about Aliens – and Ourselves.

== L ==
- Nick Lane (2010). Life Ascending: The Ten Great Inventions of Evolution.
- Gabriel E. Lasker (1961). The Evolution of Man: A Brief Introduction to Physical Anthropology.
- Daniel Levitin (2008). The World in Six Songs: How the Musical Brain Created Human Nature.

== M ==
- John Maynard Smith (1958). The Theory of Evolution.
- John Maynard Smith (1972). On Evolution.
- John Maynard Smith (1978). The Evolution of Sex.
- John Maynard Smith (1982). Evolution and the Theory of Games.
- John Maynard Smith (1989). Evolutionary Genetics.
- John Maynard Smith and Eörs Szathmáry (1995). The Major Transitions in Evolution.
- John Maynard Smith and Eörs Szathmáry (1999). The Origins of Life: From the Birth of Life to the Origin of Language.
- Ernst Mayr (2002). What Evolution Is.
- Ernst Mayr (2007). One Long Argument: Charles Darwin and the Genesis of Modern Evolutionary Thought.
- Kenneth R. Miller (2000). Finding Darwin's God: A Scientist's Search for Common Ground Between God and Evolution.
- Kenneth R. Miller (2008). Only a Theory: Evolution and the Battle for America's Soul.

== N ==
- National Academies of Science (2008). Science, Evolution, and Creationism.
- Bill Nye (2014). Undeniable: Evolution and the Science of Creation.

== P ==
- Jean-Baptiste De Panafieu (2011). Evolution.
- Donald Prothero (2006). After the Dinosaurs: The Age of Mammals.
- Donald Prothero (2007). Evolution: What the Fossils Say and Why It Matters.
- Steven Pinker (1997). How the Mind Works.

== R ==
- Matt Ridley (1993). The Red Queen: Sex and the Evolution of Human Nature.
- Matt Ridley (1996). The Origins of Virtue.
- Matt Ridley (1999). Genome: The Autobiography of a Species in 23 Chapters.
- Matt Ridley (2003). Nature Via Nurture: Genes, Experience, and What Makes Us Human.
  - Reprinted as The Agile Gene: How Nature Turns on Nurture.
- Michael Ruse (1998). Taking Darwin Seriously: A Naturalistic Approach to Philosophy.
- Michael Ruse (1999). The Darwinian Revolution: Science Red in Tooth and Claw.
- Michael Ruse (2001). The Evolution Wars: A Guide to the Debates.
- Michael Ruse (2001). Mystery of Mysteries: Is Evolution a Social Construction?.
- Michael Ruse (2006). Darwinism and Its Discontents.
- Michael Ruse (2006). Evolution-Creation Struggle.

== S ==
- Carl Sagan (1977). The Dragons of Eden: Speculations on the Evolution of Human Intelligence.
- Neil Shubin (2008). Your Inner Fish: A Journey into the 3.5-Billion-Year History of the Human Body.
- John Skoyles and Dorion Sagan (2002). Up from Dragons: The evolution of human intelligence.
- Cameron M. Smith and Charles Sullivan (2006). The Top 10 Myths About Evolution.

== W ==
- Nicholas Wade (2006). Before the Dawn: Recovering the Lost History of Our Ancestors.
- Jonathan Weiner (1994). The Beak of the Finch: A Story of Evolution in Our Time.
- David Sloan Wilson (2007). Evolution for Everyone: How Darwin's Theory Can Change the Way We Think About Our Lives.
- David Sloan Wilson (2019). This View of Life: Completing the Darwinian Revolution
- Bernard Wood (2006). Human Evolution: A Very Short Introduction.

== Z ==
- Carl Zimmer (2001). Evolution: The Triumph of an Idea.
- Carl Zimmer (2005). Smithsonian Intimate Guide to Human Origins.
