= Why Evolution is True =

Popular science book

- Author: Jerry Coyne
- Genre: Popular science
- Publication date: 2009
- ISBN: 978-0-19-923084-6

Why Evolution is True is a popular science book by American biologist Jerry Coyne. It was published in 2009, dubbed "Darwin Year" as it marked the bicentennial of Charles Darwin and the hundred and fiftieth anniversary of the publication of his On the Origin of Species By Means of Natural Selection. Coyne examines the evidence for evolution, some of which was known to Darwin (biogeography) and some of which has emerged in recent years (molecular biology). The book was a New York Times bestseller, and reviewers praised the logic of Coyne's arguments and the clarity of his prose. It was reprinted as part of the Oxford Landmark Science series.

== Summary ==
Chapter One, "What is Evolution?", gives a brief overview of Darwin's theory of evolution by natural selection as theory and fact. He writes that the "process is remarkably simple. It requires only that individuals of a species vary genetically in their ability to survive and reproduce in their environment. Given this, natural selection—and evolution—are inevitable."

Chapter Two, "Written in the Rocks", examines evidence of evolution from paleontology. Coyne highlights several transitional fossils, notably Tiktaalik, a transitional form between lobe-finned fish and amphibians discovered by his University of Chicago colleague Neil Shubin in 2004. He traces the history of fossils showing the evolution of birds from theropod dinosaurs, starting with the discovery of Archaeopteryx in 1861 and culminating with several fossil discoveries made in the 1990s such as Sinornithosarus millenii, Microraptor gui and Mei long. The evolution of whales from artiodactyls is remarkably well-preserved, as documented by Indohyus, Pakicetus, Ambulocetus, Rhodocetus, Basilosaurus and Dorudon. Many of these fossils were predicted to exist before they were discovered, an example of evolution's predictive power. The transitional fossils in human evolution are discussed in Chapter Eight.

Chapter Three, "Remnants: Vestiges, Embryos and Bad Design", examines examples of bad design in nature. Coyne looks at vestigial traits like the wings of flightless birds, the eyes of sightless animals, and the pelvic girdle and hind-limb bones of whales. He also looks at atavisms, the spontaneous recurrences of ancestral traits, such as horses born with extra toes. Evolution predicts the existence of pseudogenes, segments of DNA which were functional genes in an ancestor but have been inactivated by mutation. This prediction is confirmed, as the human genome contains thousands of pseudogenes. An example is the pseudogene for L-gulonolactone oxidase, the enzyme which produces Vitamin C in most mammals but not in the haplorhine suborder of primates, which includes humans, chimpanzees, gorillas and orangutans (hence why people must consume Vitamin C to avoid scurvy). That the same pseudogene is present in all these species is evidence that they share a recent common ancestor. Evolution makes another testable prediction: since humans are more closely related to chimpanzees than gorillas, and to gorillas than orangutans, the pseudogene should be most similar between humans and chimpanzees, less similar between humans and gorillas, and least similar between humans and orangutans (it acts as a molecular clock). That is what is found. Other species have pseudogenes: dolphins have pseudogenes for olfactory receptor proteins which they inherited from their land-dwelling ancestors, and the platypus, which lacks a stomach, still has pseudogenes for digestive enzymes. Finally, he examines evidence from embryology, such as the existence of lanugo in the fetuses of many mammals, including humans. (Lanugo also appears in fetal whales and dolphins, further evidence they are descended from land-dwelling mammals.) Coyne begins the chapter by citing Theodosius Dobzhansky's quote that "Nothing in biology makes sense except in the light of evolution", and concludes that vestigial traits, atavisms and pseudogenes can only be explained by evolution by natural selection.

Chapter Four, "The Geography of Life", examines evidence of evolution from biogeography. Darwin's observations of the distribution of species while serving as naturalist for the HMS Beagle led him to his theory, and modern theories of plate tectonics and molecular taxonomy can explain things Darwin could not. There are similar placental and marsupial mammals on different continents (the marsupial sugar glider resembles the flying squirrel), which is explained by convergent evolution: species facing similar selection pressures will evolve similar adaptations. Further evidence comes from island biogeography. Coyne says he asks his students why oceanic islands, which were not connected to continents but arose in the ocean from volcanoes or coral reefs, have endemic species of birds, insects and plants but not land mammals, reptiles, amphibians or freshwater fish. The answer is that species from the former group can colonize oceanic islands. There are many examples of oceanic islands with adaptive radiations, such as the Hawaiian honeycreepers or Darwin's finches, which are similar to species on the nearest mainland. In contrast, continental islands, which broke off from continents, have more balanced biotas, and very old continental islands have adaptive radiations of mammals, such as Madagascar's lemurs.

Chapter Five, "The Engine of Evolution", looks at examples of natural selection, which Darwin (along with Alfred Russell Wallace, working independently) proposed as the mechanism for evolution. Coyne rebuts the claim that "evolution says everything happens by chance." Natural selection is non-random, as it selects the traits which are adaptive and discards those that are not: "It is a powerful molding force, accumulating genes that have a greater chance of being passed on than others, and in so doing making individuals ever better able to cope with their environment." He quotes Richard Dawkins's definition of natural selection: "the non-random survival of random variants." Coyne points to examples of natural selection in the lab, such as the evolution of antibiotic resistant bacteria and Richard Lenski's E. coli long term evolution experiment, and examples seen in the wild, such as Peter and Rosemary Grant's study of Darwin's finches in the Galápagos Islands. He rebuts the claim that evolution cannot create complexity: since natural selection is non-random, it can create complex adaptations by selecting for advantageous variations. In an experiment by Barry Hall, E. coli that had the gene for lactase deleted evolved the ability to digest lactose with another enzyme. Creationists claim that the mammalian eye is too complex to have evolved, but there are extant species with simpler, but useful, eyes, such as the eyespot of the planarian and pinhole camera eye of the chambered nautilus. He describes a mathematical model by Dan-Eric Nilsson and Susanne Pelger which found that complex eyes can evolve in fewer than 400,000 years. Given that the oldest fossils of animals with eyes are 550 million years old, there has been time for eyes to have evolved several times. In fact, eyes have evolved several times independently, another example of convergent evolution. And Nilsson and Pelger's model was deliberately conservative, so eyes can evolve in even less time. He quotes Pelger and Nilsson: "It is obvious that the eye was never a real threat to Darwin's theory of evolution."

Chapter Six, "How Sex Drives Evolution", looks at Darwin's theory of sexual selection ("selection that increases an individual's chance of getting a mate"), outlined in his book The Descent of Man, and Selection in Relation to Sex and how it can account for sexual dimorphism in species, such as the plumage of the male peacock.

Chapter Seven, "The Origin of Species", looks at Coyne's specialty, speciation, or the formation of new species. (Incidentally, this is one thing Darwin did not address in his book; Coyne suggests a better title would have been The Origin of Adaptations.) He looks at Ernst Mayr's biological species concept, which defines a species as "a reproductive community—a gene pool. And this means that species is an evolutionary community. If a 'good mutation' crops us within a certain species, say a mutation in tigers that boosts a female's output of cubs by ten percent, then the gene containing that mutation will spread throughout the tiger species. But it won't go any further, for tigers don't exchange genes with other species. The biological species, then, is the unit of evolution—it is, to a large extent, the thing that evolves." He examines the evidence for allopatric speciation, such as sister species of snapping shrimp on different sides of the Isthmus of Panama. He argues that sympatric speciation is less common, but can occur, as evidenced by studies of cichlids in African lakes.

Chapter Eight, "What About Us?", examines the evidence for human evolution, starting with Raymond Dart's discovery of Australopithecus africanus and goes on to discuss Donald Johanson's discovery of Australopithecus afarensis ("Lucy"), Mary Leakey's discovery of the Laetoli footprints and Michel Brunet's discovery of Sahelanthropus tchadensis. He also discusses the genetic similarities between humans and modern primates, especially chimpanzees. In chapter 3, he notes that our genome contains dead genes from endogenous retroviruses, and that "some of these remnants sit in exactly the same location on the chromosomes of humans and chimpanzees. These were surely viruses that infected our common ancestor and were passed on to both descendants. Since there is almost no chance of viruses inserting themselves independently at exactly the same spot in two species, this points strongly to common ancestry."

Chapter Nine, "Evolution Redux", examines what evolution can tell us, and what it cannot. He concludes that understanding evolution ennobles us: "We are the one creature to whom natural selection has bequeathed a brain complex enough to comprehend the laws that govern the universe. And we should be proud that we are the only species that has figured out how we came to be."

== Reception ==
Rowan Hooper, reviewing the book in New Scientist, called it a "wide-ranging, beautifully written account." Reviewing the book for the National Center for Science Eductation, paleontologist Donald R. Prothero said Coyne "does a beautiful job of covering nearly all the bases in a succinct but enjoyable and gently persuasive fashion." Reviewing the book for The BioLogos Foundation, Robert C. Bishop wrote "The breadth and clarity of Coyne’s explanation and discussion of the evidence supporting evolution is impressive. Christians who have even a passing interest in science should give what he has to say careful, prayerful reflection." That said, Bishop criticized Coyne's approach to science and faith as "problematic". In The Wall Street Journal, Philip Kitcher wrote "the book is designed to present the evidence in an accessible way and thus to convince those who might otherwise be seduced by the blandishments of creationists... Coyne has offered Darwin a splendid birthday present." In the New York Review of Books, Richard C. Lewontin wrote that Coyne's "primary object in writing this book is to present the incontrovertible evidence that evolution is a physical fact of the history of life on Earth... In this he is entirely successful." E. O. Wilson said "For anyone who wishes a clear, well-written explanation of evolution by one of the foremost scientists working on the subject, Why Evolution is True should be your choice." Richard Dawkins reviewed the book favorably in The Times Literary Supplement, saying "I once wrote that anybody who didn't believe in evolution must be stupid, insane or ignorant, and I was then careful to add that ignorance is no crime. I should now update my statement: anybody who doesn't believe in evolution is stupid, insane, or hasn't read Jerry Coyne."

== See also ==
- The Making of the Fittest DNA and the Ultimate Forensic Record of Evolution by Sean B. Carroll, about evidence of evolution from genomics
- The Greatest Show on Earth: The Evidence for Evolution by Richard Dawkins, also published in 2009
- Only a Theory: Evolution and the Battle For America's Soul by Kenneth R. Miller
- The Beak of the Finch: A Story Of Evolution In Our Time by Jonathan Weiner, about the work of Peter and Rosemary Grant with Darwin's finches, winner of the 1995 Pulitzer Prize for General Nonfiction
