= METI International =

Organization conducting active SETI

- Formation: 2015
- Headquarters: San Francisco
- Founder: Douglas Vakoch
- Website: meti.org

METI International, known simply as METI, is a non-profit research organization founded in July 2015 by Douglas Vakoch that creates and transmits interstellar messages to attempt to communicate with extraterrestrial intelligence (ETI). It is based in San Francisco, California.

== Overview ==
METI targets nearby stars and researches the nature of the messages to send. On October 16, 17, and 18, 2017, it sent a message consisting of a scientific and mathematical tutorial to the red dwarf Luyten's Star, just over 12 light years from Earth. The message was sent from a radio transmitter at the EISCAT research facility in Tromsø, Norway.

METI's aim is to build an interdisciplinary community to design interstellar messages, within the context of the evolution of intelligence and language. In May 2016, it convened the meeting “The Intelligence Of SETI: Cognition And Communication In Extraterrestrial Intelligence” in Puerto Rico. In May 2018 in Los Angeles, it held “Language in the Cosmos” in conjunction with the International Space Development Conference. to examine the connection between astrobiology and linguistics. On March 22, 2017, it held a workshop in Paris examining the question "What is life?" from an extraterrestrial perspective.

METI also conducts an optical search of extraterrestrial intelligence (SETI). Its optical observatory in Panama looks for laser pulses from advanced civilizations. It has examined anomalous stars like the nearby red dwarf star Ross 128, as well as HD 164595, 94 light years from Earth. None of the searches has yielded evidence of artificial signals.

== Criticism ==
American scientist and science-fiction author David Brin has questioned "whether small groups of zealots should bypass all institutions, peer critique, risk appraisal or public opinion, to shout ‘yoohoo’ into a potentially hazardous cosmos" and so force a fait accompli on humanity.

Numerous other authors and scientists have expressed similar concerns, generally known as the dark forest hypothesis of ETI, including Stephen Hawking. Of particular interest in science fiction is Cixin Liu's Remembrance of Earth's Past, exploring the theory and some of its implications.

== Notable members ==
Notable members of METI's Board of Directors and Advisory Council include:

- Iván Almár, Consultant, Konkoly Observatory of the Hungarian Academy of Sciences, Hungary
- Setsuko Aoki, Professor of Policy Management, Keio University, Japan
- Jacques Arnould, Ethics Advisor, Centre national d'études spatiales (CNES), France
- Jerome H. Barkow, Professor Emeritus of Social Anthropology, Dalhousie University, Canada
- Nelly Ben Hayoun, Designer of Experiences, Nelly Ben Hayoun Studios, UK
- Lowry Burgess, Professor of Art, Carnegie Mellon University, USA
- Kerri Chandler, Founder of Madhouse Records, USA
- Nathaniel C. Comfort, Professor of History of Medicine, Johns Hopkins School of Medicine, USA
- Paul Davies, Regents' Professor and Director of the Beyond Center, Arizona State University, USA
- Steven J. Dick, Former Chief Historian, National Aeronautics and Space Administration (NASA), USA
- David Dunér, Professor of History of Science and Ideas, Lund University, Sweden
- George Dvorsky, chair of the board, Institute for Ethics and Emerging Technologies, Canada
- José Gabriel Funes, Professor of Philosophy of Nature, Catholic University of Córdoba, Argentina
- Ellen Howell, Senior Research Astronomer, Lunar and Planetary Laboratory, University of Arizona, USA
- Chris Impey, Associate Dean, College of Science and Distinguished Professor of Astronomy, University of Arizona, USA
- Mary Lee Jensvold, Director of the Chimpanzee and Human Communication Institute (CHCI), Central Washington University, USA
- James Kasting, Evan Pugh University Professor, Pennsylvania State University, USA
- Arik Kershenbaum, Fellow of Girton College at the University of Cambridge, and author of The Zoologist's Guide to the Galaxy, UK
- Guillermo A. Lemarchand, Researcher and Science Policy Consultant, UNESCO, Argentina
- Jeffrey A. Lockwood, Professor of Natural Sciences and Humanities, University of Wyoming, USA
- Roger Malina, Arts and Technology Distinguished Chair and Professor of Physics, University of Texas at Dallas, USA
- Lori Marino, Founder and executive director, Kimmela Center for Animal Advocacy, Inc., USA
- David Messerschmitt, Roger A. Strauch Professor Emeritus of Electrical Engineering & Computer Sciences, University of California, Berkeley, USA
- Anson Mount, Actor; known for his portrayal of fictional character, Cullen Bohannon, in the AMC western drama series, Hell on Wheels, and Captain Christopher Pike in season two of Star Trek: Discovery and Star Trek: Strange New Worlds, USA
- Elisabeth Oberzaucher, Faculty of Life Sciences, University of Vienna, Austria
- Alexander Ollongren, Professor Emeritus at Leiden Institute of Advanced Computer Science (LIACS), Leiden University, Netherlands
- Serpil Oppermann, Past President, EASCLE (European Association for the Study of Literature, Culture, and the Environment), Turkey
- Irene Pepperberg, Research Associate, Harvard University, USA
- Ted Peters, Research Professor Emeritus in Systematic Theology and Ethics, Graduate Theological Union (GTU), USA
- Stephen G. Post, Director, Center for Medical Humanities, Compassionate Care, and Bioethics, Stony Brook University, USA
- Ian Roberts, Professor of Linguistics, University of Cambridge, UK
- Holmes Rolston III, University Distinguished Professor and Professor of Philosophy, Emeritus, Colorado State University, USA
- Vandana Singh, Professor and Chair of Physics and Earth Sciences, Framingham State University, USA
- Susan Stryker, Associate Professor of Gender and Women's Studies and Director of the Institute for LGBT Studies, University of Arizona, USA
- Koji Tachibana, Associate Professor of Philosophy, Chiba University, Japan
- John Traphagan, Professor of Religious Studies and Anthropology and Mitsubishi Heavy Industries Fellow, University of Texas at Austin, USA
- Douglas Vakoch, President of METI, USA
- Ariel Waldman, Global Director, Science Hack Day, USA

== See also ==
- Active SETI — METI (Messaging to Extra-Terrestrial Intelligence)
- Fermi paradox — Lack of evidence that extraterrestrials exist
- SETIcon – Public conventions on the search for extraterrestrial intelligence
- Zoo hypothesis — Hypothesis that suggests humanity is effectively caged on Earth
