= Nothing in Biology Makes Sense Except in the Light of Evolution =

1973 essay by Theodosius Dobzhansky

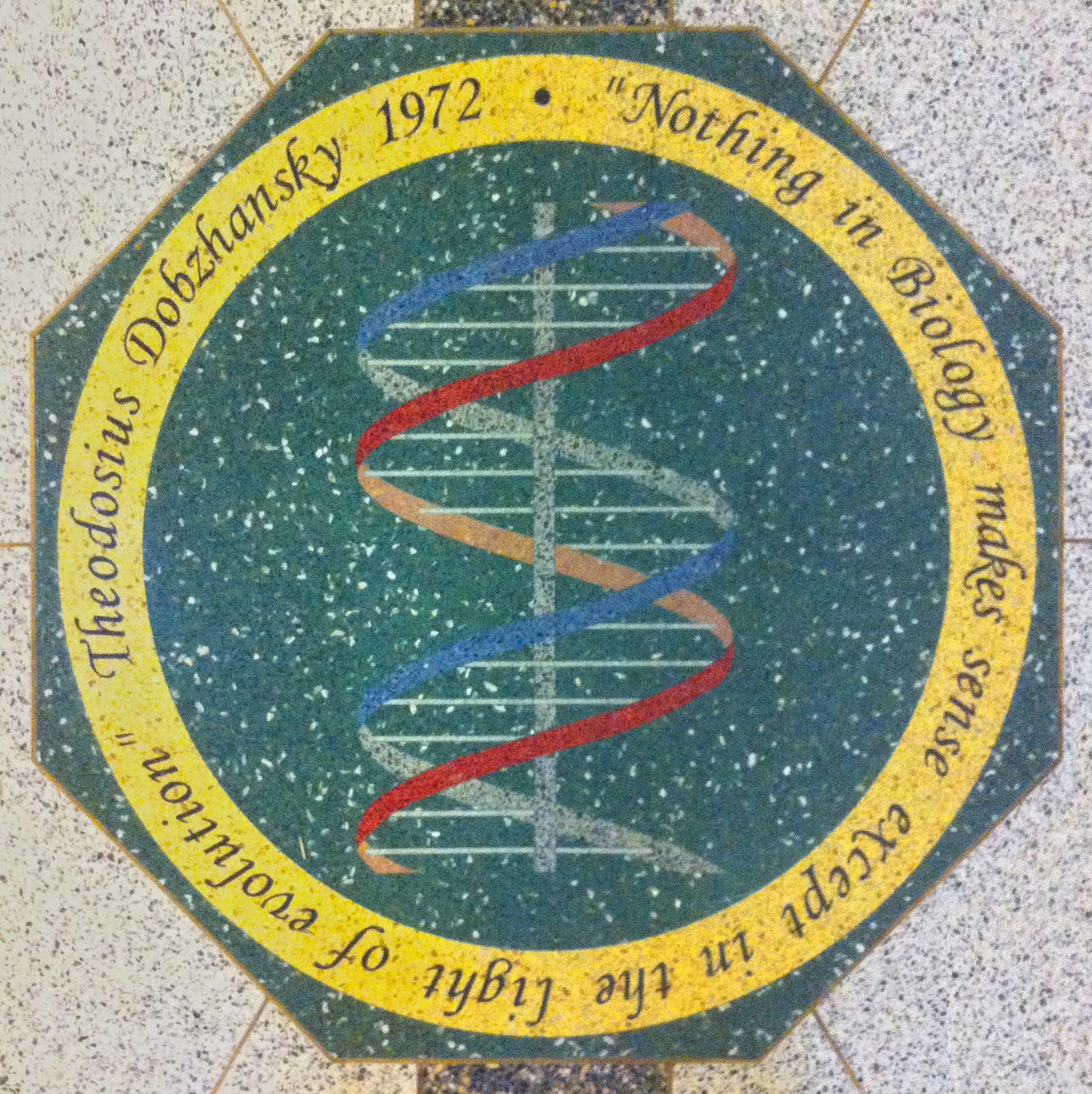
Mosaic medallion in the floor of the main hall of the Jordan Hall of Science, University of Notre Dame

"Nothing in Biology Makes Sense Except in the Light of Evolution" is an essay by the evolutionary biologist Theodosius Dobzhansky, criticizing anti-evolution creationism and espousing theistic evolution. The essay was first published in American Biology Teacher in 1973.

Dobzhansky first used the title statement, in a slight variation, in a 1964 presidential address to the American Society of Zoologists, "Biology, Molecular and Organismic", to assert the importance of organismic biology in response to the challenge of the rising field of molecular biology. The term "light of evolution"—or sub specie evolutionis—had been used earlier by the Jesuit priest and paleontologist Pierre Teilhard de Chardin and then by the biologist Julian Huxley.

As he had said in his earlier presidential address, "If the living world has not arisen from common ancestors by means of an evolutionary process, then the fundamental unity of living things is a hoax and their diversity is a joke." The unity and diversity of life provide central themes for his essay.

== Overview ==
Dobzhansky notes that in 1966, Shaikh Abdul Aziz bin Baz espoused the geocentric view that the Sun revolves around the Earth. The sheik said that the heliocentric model was “a mere theory”. Dobzhansky notes that it is a theory with explanatory power, in that it makes sense of things that would be inexplicable otherwise. He goes on to show that the same is true of evolution.

Dobzhansky describes the diversity of life: "Between 1.5 and 2 million species of animals and plants have been described and studied; the number yet to be discovered is probably about as great." He describes the adaption of species to niches: "Perhaps the narrowest ecological niche of all is that of a species of the fungus family Laboulbeniaceae, which grows exclusively on the rear portion of the elytra of the beetle Aphenops croneii, which is found only in some limestone caves in southern France. Larvae of the fly Psilopa petrolei develop in seepages of crude oil in California oilfields; as far as is known they occur nowhere else. ... Larvae of the fly Drosophila carcinophila develop only in the nephric grooves beneath the flaps of the third maxilliped of the land crab Gecarcinus ruricola, which is restricted to certain islands in the Caribbean."

He asks, "Is there an explanation, to make intelligible to reason this colossal diversity of living beings? Whence came these extraordinary, seemingly whimsical and superfluous creatures, like the fungus Laboulbenia, the beetle Aphenops cronei, the flies Psilopa petrolei and Drosophila carcinophila, and many, many more apparent biologic curiosities? The only explanation that makes sense is that the organic diversity has evolved in response to the diversity of environment on the planet earth. No single species, however perfect and however versatile, could exploit all the opportunities for living. … The evolutionary process tends to fill up the available ecologic niches. It does not do so consciously or deliberately; the relations between evolution and the environment are more subtle and interesting than that.” He writes that such diversity becomes "reasonable and understandable if the Creator has created the living world not by caprice but by evolution propelled by natural selection." He notes that "Natural selection is at once a blind and creative process. Only a creative but blind process could produce, on the one hand, the tremendous biologic success that is the human species and, on the other hand, forms of adpatedness as narrow and as constraining as those of the overspecialized fungus, beetle, and flies mentioned above."

He notes that most of the species that have existed over Earth’s tenure are extinct. "All this is understandable in light of evolution theory; but what a senseless operation it would have been, on God’s part, to fabricate a multitude of species ex nihilo and then let most of them die out!"

He turns to the unity of life: "From viruses to man, heredity is coded in just two, chemically related substances: DNA and RNA. The genetic code is as simple as it is universal. There are only four genetic 'letters' in DNA: adenine, guanine, thymine, and cytosine. Uracil replaces thymine in RNA. The entire evolutionary development of the living world has taken place not by invention of new 'letters' in the genetic 'alphabet' but by elaboration of ever-new combinations of these letters.

Not only is the DNA-RNA genetic code universal, but so is the method of translation of the sequences of the 'letters' in DNA-RNA into sequences of amino acids in proteins. The same 20 amino acids compose countless different proteins in all, or at least in most, organisms. Different amino acids are coded by one to six nucleotide triplets in DNA and RNA. And the biochemical universals extend beyond the genetic code and its translation into proteins: striking uniformities prevail in the cellular metabolism of the most diverse living beings." He notes the similarity of proteins in different species: "the so-called alpha chains of hemoglobin have identical sequences of amino acids in man and the chimpanzee, but they differ in a single amino acid (out of 141) in the gorilla. Alpha chains of human hemoglobin differ from cattle hemoglobin in 17 amino acid substitutions, 18 from horse, 20 from donkey, 25 from rabbit, and 71 from fish (carp)." Another example of the unity of life comes from the molecular sequence of cytochrome C, which Emanuel Margoliash and Walter M. Fitch had shown to be similar in a wide range of species, including monkeys, tuna, kangaroos, and yeast. This unity is further illustrated comparative anatomy and embryology. Either God deliberately arranged things "to mislead sincere seekers of truth" or these similarities are the result of evolution.

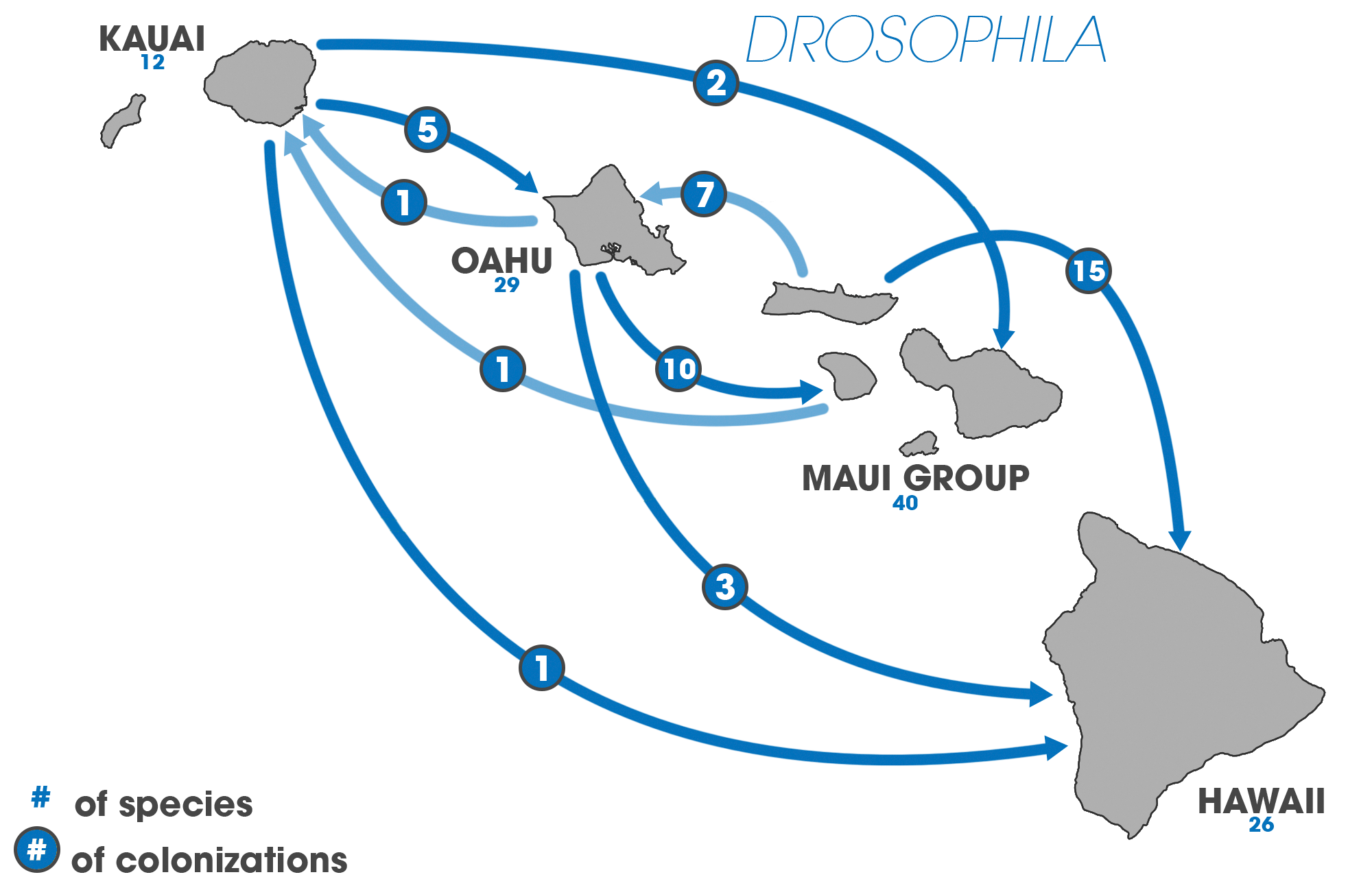
Dobzhansky used the example of the adaptive radiation of Drosophila fruit flies (blue arrows) on Hawaii.

He turns to biogeography: "There are about 2,000 species of drosophilid flies in the world as a whole. About a quarter of them occur in Hawaii, although the total area of the archipelago is about that of the state of New Jersey. All but 17 of the species in Hawaii are endemic (found nowhere else)." He cites work by Hampton L. Carson, H. T. Spieth, D. E. Hardy and others explaining this: "Oceanic islands other than Hawaii, scattered over the wide Pacific Ocean, are not conspicuously rich in endemic species of drosophilids. The most probable explanation of this fact is that that these other islands were colonized by drosophilids after most ecologic niches had already been filled by earlier arrivals. This surely is a hypothesis, but it is a reasonable one. Antievolutionists might perhaps suggest an alternative hypothesis: in a fit of absent-mindedness, the Creator went on manufacturing more and more drosphilid species for Hawaii, until there was an extravagant surfeit of them in this archipelago. I leave it to you to decide which hypothesis makes more sense."

Dobzhansky concludes that scripture and science are two different things: "It is a blunder to mistake the Holy Scriptures for elementary textbooks of astronomy, geology, biology, and anthropology." He argues that the choice between science and religion is false: "It is wrong to hold creation and evolution as mutually exclusive alternatives. I am a creationist and an evolutionist. Evolution is God's, or Nature's method of creation. Creation is not an event that happened in 4004 BC; it is a process that began some 10 billion years ago and is still under way." He argues that evolution provides an organizing principle for biology: "Seen in the light of evolution, biology is, perhaps, intellectually the most satisfying and inspiring science. Without that light it becomes a pile of sundry facts—some of them interesting or curious but making no meaningful picture as a whole."

== The underlying theme ==
Dobzhnsky shows that evolution is unifying theme in biology, accounting for the unity and diversity of life. The fact that evolution occurs explains the interrelatedness of the various facts of biology, and so makes biology make sense. The concept has become firmly established as a unifying idea in biology education.

== The phrase ==
The notion of the "light of evolution" came originally from the vitalist Jesuit priest Pierre Teilhard de Chardin, whom Dobzhansky much admired. In the last paragraph of the article, Dobzhansky quotes from de Chardin's 1955 The Phenomenon of Man:

(Evolution) general condition to which all theories, all hypotheses, all systems must bow and which they must satisfy henceforward if they are to be thinkable and true. Evolution is a light which illuminates all facts, a curve that all lines must follow. (p. 219 of The Phenomenon of Man)

The phrase "nothing in biology makes sense except in the light of evolution" has come into common use by those opposing creationism. While the essay argues (following de Chardin) that Christianity and evolutionary biology are compatible, a position described as theistic evolution, the phrase is also used by those who consider a creator to be unnecessary, such as Richard Dawkins, who published The Selfish Gene just three years later.

== See also ==
- Finding Darwin's God by Kenneth R. Miller
- The Language of God by Francis Collins
