= Faith Versus Fact =

2015 book by Jerry Coyne

Faith Versus Fact: Why Science and Religion Are Incompatible
- Author: Jerry Coyne
- Publisher: Viking Press
- Publication date: 2015
- Pages: 311
- ISBN: 978-0-670-02653-1

Faith Versus Fact: Why Science and Religion Are Incompatible is a 2015 book by the biologist Jerry Coyne concerning the relationship between science and religion. Coyne argues that religion and science are incompatible, by surveying the history of science and stating that both religion and science make claims about the universe, yet only science is open to the fact that it may be wrong.

Coyne was astonished that after having published his book Why Evolution is True that the proportion of creationists in the United States still remained between 40 and 46 percent. He felt that faith was the main reason many people continued to reject the facts and evidence for evolution.

== Synopsis ==
Coyne defines science as "a collection of methods" that yield knowledge which may be rejected or confirmed via testing. With this definition in hand, he went on to argue that religion and science were inherently incompatible "because they have different methods of getting knowledge about reality, different ways of assessing the reliability of that knowledge, and, in the end, arrive at conflicting conclusions about the universe". Coyne believes that theistic religions make claims which conflict with science in three ways, namely methodology, outcomes and philosophy.

A substantial portion of his book criticizes theistic evolution, arguing that if God were to use evolution as a method of creation, the evolutionary process should show signs of directionality.

== Reception ==
Kirkus Reviews lauded the book as "important", stating that it deserves "an open-minded readership". They add that "although he makes a clear and cogent argument, he may find that, once again, he is preaching to his own choir." Rau Olson of Booklist wrote that "none of [the New Atheists] makes the case for the final divorce of religion and science, with permanent restraining orders against harassment and stalking of science by religion, better than Coyne". Brandon Robshaw, reviewing the book for The Independent, agreed, saying,

Another oft-repeated criticism of new atheists is that they haven’t read any theology. Coyne has made a point of doing so, and totally dismantles Alvin Plantinga’s sophisticated version of the God of the Gaps argument. No doubt this book will attract the spiteful ire that defenders of faith have already directed at atheists such as Richard Dawkins, Daniel Dennett and Sam Harris. But the ad hominem nature of that ire suggests a certain insecurity. Jerry Coyne is the perfect candidate to replace the late Christopher Hitchens as the fourth Horseman of the New Atheist Apocalypse.

Some reviewers felt the book did not make a very strong case for why religion and science could not co-exist. The biologist Austin L. Hughes wrote for the social conservative New Atlantis that "what Coyne is attempting in Faith Versus Fact falls under the general heading of philosophy. But his philosophical training seems inadequate to the task, since he fails to develop a consistent terminology and to construct arguments with any degree of rigor." He feels that Coyne's arguments attempting to show that doubt is necessary, or endemic, to science eventually fall on themselves, asking, "but if we push our doubt far enough, won't we eventually end up doubting even science?"

The science journalist John Horgan wrote a highly critical review of the book in Scientific American, stating:

Mr. Coyne repeatedly reminds us that science, unlike religion, promotes self-criticism, but he is remarkably lacking in this virtue himself. He rejects complaints that some modern scientists are guilty of "scientism," which I would define as excessive trust – faith! – in science. Actually, Faith vs. Fact serves as a splendid specimen of scientism. Mr. Coyne disparages not only religion but also other human ways of engaging with reality. The arts, he argues, "cannot ascertain truth or knowledge," and the humanities do so only to the extent that they emulate the sciences. This sort of arrogance and certitude is the essence of scientism.

In a highly critical review for First Things, the Catholic philosopher Edward Feser criticized the book for being unable to define its terms consistently, writing that:

[Coyne] has no consistent account at all of what religion is. On one page, he will tell you that Jainism is not really the sort of thing he means by "religion." Forty pages later, he’ll offer Jainism as an example of the sort of thing he means by "religion." If the views of some theologian are clearly compatible with science, Coyne will assure us that what theologians have to say is irrelevant to determining what is typical of religion. But if a theologian says something that Coyne thinks is stupid, then what theologians have to say suddenly becomes highly relevant to determining what is typical of religion. When churchmen refuse to abandon some doctrine, Coyne tells us that this shows that religion is dogmatic and unwilling to adjust itself to modern knowledge. When churchmen do abandon some doctrine, Coyne tells us that this shows that religion is unfalsifiable and desperate to adjust itself to modern knowledge. It seems Coyne also missed that lecture in logic class about the fallacy of special pleading.

== See also ==
- Rejection of evolution by religious groups
- Scientism
