= Luyten b =

Super-Earth orbiting Luyten's Star

Luyten's Star b
Discovery
- Discovered by: Astudillo-Defru et al., HARPS
- Discovery date: 17 March 2017
- Detection method: Radial velocity

Orbital characteristics
- Semi-major axis: 0.091101+0.000019 −0.000017 AU
- Eccentricity: 0.10+0.09 −0.07
- Orbital period (sidereal): 18.6498+0.0059 −0.0052 d
- Semi-amplitude: 1.61±0.15 m/s
- Star: Luyten's Star

Physical characteristics
- Mass: ≥2.89+0.27 −0.26 M_{🜨}
- Temperature: 259 K (−14 °C; 7 °F)

Luyten's Star b (GJ 273 b) is a confirmed exoplanet, likely rocky, orbiting within the habitable zone of the nearby red dwarf Luyten's Star. It is the fourth-closest potentially habitable exoplanet known, at a distance of 12 light-years. Only Proxima Centauri b, Ross 128 b, and GJ 1061 d are closer. Discovered alongside Gliese 273c in June 2017, Luyten b is a super-Earth of around 2.89 times the mass of Earth and receives only 6% more starlight than Earth, making it one of the best candidates for habitability.

== Characteristics ==
=== Mass, radius, and temperature ===
==== Mass and size ====
Luyten b is a super-Earth, meaning that it has a mass and/or radius greater than that of Earth, but less than that of Uranus or Neptune. Radial velocity measurements shows that the planet has a minimum mass of 2.89 M_{🜨}, placing it at the lower end of the super-Earth range. The planet has not been found to transit its star, and as a result its true mass and radius are not known. Due to its low mass, the planet is likely terrestrial, with a predicted radius of 1.51 R_{🜨}.

Up to four candidate planets have been proposed around Luyten's Star. A 2020 study showed that if all four planets are present, their true masses must be close to their minimum masses for the system to be stable, with an upper limit of 3.03 M_{🜨} for Luyten b.

==== Temperature ====
The planet receives an incident flux only 6% greater than that of Earth. With an estimated albedo, or proportion of light reflected by the planet, of 0.30, Luyten b has an equilibrium temperature of 259 K. For comparison, Earth has an equilibrium temperature of 255 K. With an Earth-like atmosphere — if it has one — Luyten b would have an average surface temperature of about 292 K (19 °C; 66 °F), very similar to that of Earth.

=== Orbit and rotation ===
Luyten b orbits quite close to its host star. One full revolution around Luyten's Star takes about 18.6 days at an average distance of 0.091 AU, much closer in than Mercury, which has a year of 88 days and an orbital radius of 0.387 AU. However, because the host star is so dim, Luyten b falls right within the system's habitable zone and only receives 6% more starlight than Earth. Luyten b has a moderate orbital eccentricity of 0.10 ± 0.08.

=== Host star ===
Luyten's Star is a medium-sized red dwarf star on the main sequence. It has 29.3% the radius, 29% the mass, 0.88% the luminosity of the Sun, and has an effective temperature of 3,382 K. Unlike many nearby red dwarfs, like Proxima Centauri, Luyten's Star is very inactive with a long rotation period of over 118 days.

== Active SETI ==
In October 2017 and 2018, the nonprofit organization METI (Messaging Extraterrestrial Intelligence) sent a message, "Sónar Calling GJ273b", containing dozens of short musical compositions and a scientific "tutorial" towards the planet in hopes of contacting any potential extraterrestrial civilizations.

== See also ==
- LHS 1140 b, a massive habitable zone Super-Earth around another quiet star
- List of potentially habitable exoplanets
- Proxima Centauri b, the closest potentially habitable exoplanet to Earth
- Ross 128 b, the second-closest habitable zone planet and very similar to Proxima b
