= Jeremy Keith (web developer) =

Web developer

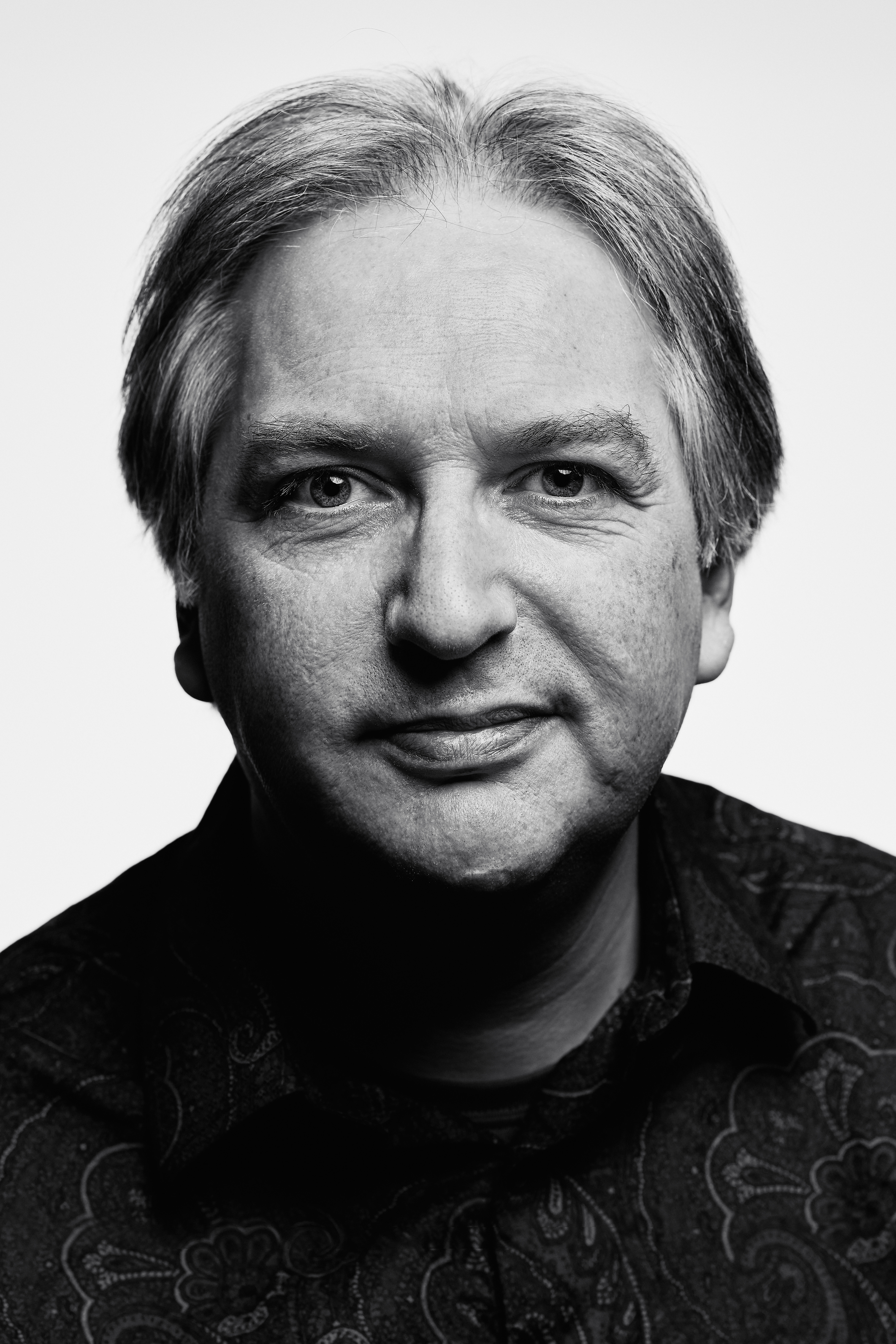
- Keith in 2019
- Born: 25 February
- Occupations: Web developer, writer, speaker, musician
- Known for: Clearleft, dConstruct, DOM Scripting, HTML5 for Web Designers, HuffDuffer, Open Device Lab, Science Hack Day
- Website: adactio.com

Jeremy Keith is an Irish web developer, writer, speaker, and musician. He authors a popular blog, and has written several books including DOM Scripting, a guide to web design with JavaScript and the Document Object Model. He curated the dConstruct conference, and co-founded Clearleft in 2005 with Andy Budd and Richard Rutter.

== Books and articles ==
=== DOM Scripting ===
Keith's book DOM Scripting is a guide to enhancements to web pages using JavaScript and web standards. It assumes some preexisting knowledge of CSS. The first edition was published in 2005 (ISBN 1590595335). Chapter 5 is available online as well as in print.

=== Bulletproof AJAX ===
Keith's book Bulletproof AJAX is a “step-by-step guide to enhancing Web sites with Ajax”. It assumes some preexisting knowledge of JavaScript. The first edition was published in February 2007 (ISBN 0321472667). The introduction is available online as well as in print.

=== HTML5 for Web Designers ===
Keith's book HTML5 for Web Designers is a guide for introducing web designers to HTML5. The first edition was published in 2010 (ISBN 978-0-9844425-0-8). The book is available online as well as in print.

=== Resilient Web Design ===
Resilient Web Design

Keith's book Resilient Web Design is a book about web design. The first edition was published in 2016, the book is only available online, it's a web book.

=== Going Offline ===
Keith's book Going Offline is a guide to service workers. It was published on 24 April 2018 by A Book Apart.

== Public Speaking ==
Jeremy Keith gave opening or closing keynotes at web design and web development conferences, and is a frequent speaker at design and interaction conferences, most notably An Event Apart.

== Open source work ==
Jeremy Keith has contributed to a number of open source projects using GitHub:

- "adactio (Jeremy Keith) · GitHub". github.com.

== Other work ==
- HuffDuffer creator
- Open Device Lab founder
- Science Hack Day first organizer
- Matter (magazine) initial release designer
- AMP Advisory Committee 2020-2021
- Homebrew Website Club Brighton organizer
- Codebar Brighton coach

== Salter Cane ==
Keith plays bouzouki in the Brighton rock band Salter Cane.
