= Luyten's Star =

Star in the constellation Canis Minor

- Location of Luyten's Star in the constellation Canis Minor

Observation data Epoch J2000 Equinox ICRS
- Constellation: Canis Minor
- Right ascension: 07^{h} 27^{m} 24.49897^{s}
- Declination: +05° 13′ 32.8415″
- Apparent magnitude (V): 9.872

Characteristics
- Spectral type: M3.5V
- U−B color index: 1.115
- B−V color index: 1.571

Astrometry
Radial velocity (R_{v})	17.35±0.19 km/s
Proper motion (μ)	RA: 571.232 mas/yr Dec.: −3,691.487 mas/yr
Parallax (π)	264.1269±0.0413 mas
Distance	12.348 ± 0.002 ly (3.7861 ± 0.0006 pc)
Absolute magnitude (M_{V})	11.94

Details
Mass	0.29 M_{☉}
Radius	0.293±0.027 R_{☉}
Luminosity	0.0088 L_{☉}
Surface gravity (log g)	5 cgs
Temperature	3,382±49 K
Metallicity [Fe/H]	0.09±0.17 dex
Rotation	115.6±19.4 d, ~99 d
Age	≳8 Gyr

Other designations
- Luyten's Star, BD+05 1668, GJ 273, HIP 36208, G 112-17, G 89-19, LFT 527, LHS 33, LTT 12021, NLTT 17881, PLX 1755, TYC 173-3208-1, GCRV 4954, MCC 17

Database references
SIMBAD	data
Exoplanet Archive	data
ARICNS	data

Luyten's Star /ˈlaɪtənz/ (GJ 273) is a red dwarf in the constellation Canis Minor located at a distance of 12.35 light-years (3.79 parsecs) from the Sun. It has a visual magnitude of 9.9, making it too faint to be viewed with the unaided eye. It is named after Willem Jacob Luyten, who, in collaboration with Edwin G. Ebbighausen, first determined its high proper motion in 1935. The star has two confirmed planets and two candidate planets, of which Luyten b is in the circumstellar habitable zone.

== Properties ==
This star is approximately a quarter the mass of the Sun and has 35% of the Sun's radius. Luyten's Star is at the maximum mass at which a red dwarf can be fully convective, which means that most if not all of the star forms an extended convection zone. It has a stellar classification of M3.5V, with the V luminosity class indicating this is a main-sequence star that is generating energy through the thermonuclear fusion of hydrogen at its core. The projected rotation rate of this star (Note: This is denoted by v sin i, where v is the rotational velocity at the equator and i is the inclination to the line of sight.) is too low to be measured, but can be no greater than 1 km/s. Measurements of periodic variation in surface activity suggest a leisurely rotation period of roughly 116 days (which would give a velocity of ~0.15 km/s). The effective temperature of the star's outer envelope is a relatively cool 3,150 K, giving the star the characteristic red-orange hue of an M-type star.

At present, Luyten's Star is moving away from the Solar System. The closest approach occurred about 13,000 years ago when it came within 3.67 parsecs. The star is currently located 1.2 light years distant from Procyon, which would appear as a visual magnitude −4.5 star in the night sky of Luyten's Star's planets. However, Luyten's Star would only have an apparent magnitude of 4.6 from Procyon's sky because it is much less luminous. The closest encounter between the two stars occurred about 600 years ago when Luyten's Star was at its minimal distance of about 1.12 ly from Procyon. The space velocity components of Luyten's Star are U = +16, V = −66 and W = −17 km/s.

== Planetary system ==
The Luyten's Star planetary system
Companion (in order from star)	Mass	Semimajor axis (AU)	Orbital period (days)	Eccentricity	Inclination (°)	Radius
c	≥1.18±0.16 M_{🜨}	0.036467±0.000002	4.7234±0.0004	0.17+0.13 −0.12	~72°–90 (Note: In a solution with 2 planets around Luyten's Star for Luyten b and Luyten c, the system was unstable when the inclination was below 50° and the planets were on very eccentric orbits. However, with lower eccentricities, the 2 planet system tolerated the full range of inclinations.)	—
b	≥2.89+0.27 −0.26 M_{🜨}	0.091101+0.000019 −0.000017	18.6498+0.0059 −0.0052	0.10+0.09 −0.07	~72°–90	—
d (unconfirmed)	≥10.8+3.9 −3.5 M_{🜨}	0.712+0.062 −0.076	413.9+4.3 −5.5	0.17+0.18 −0.17	~72°–90°	—
e (unconfirmed)	≥9.3+4.3 −3.9 M_{🜨}	0.849+0.083 −0.092	542±16	0.03+0.20 −0.03	~72°–90°	—

In March 2017, two candidate planets were discovered orbiting Luyten's Star. The outer planet, GJ 273b, is a super-Earth in its star's optimistic habitable zone. It has a minimum mass of 2.89 ± 0.26 Earth masses and orbits at a distance of 0.09110 ± 0.00002 AU, completing one orbital period in 18.650 ± 0.006 days. While the planet is on the innermost edge of the star's conservative habitable zone, the incident flux is only 1.06 S_{🜨}, so it may be potentially habitable if water and an atmosphere are present; depending on albedo, its equilibrium temperature could be anywhere between 206 and 293 Kelvin. The inner planet, GJ 273c, is one of the lightest exoplanets detected by radial velocities, with a mass of only 1.18 ± 0.16 Earth masses. However, it orbits much further in, with an orbital period of only 4.7234 ± 0.00004 days.

GJ 273b is one of the closest known planets to Earth which lies in its star's habitable zone.

Both planets are near 4:1 resonance; it is possible that, with still undiscovered ones, the entire inner part of this system is trapped in a single simple-mean-motion resonance chain like TRAPPIST-1.

In 2019, two more candidate planets were detected by radial velocity, making a potential total of four known planets in the system. If all four planets are present, their true masses must be close to their minimum masses for the system to be stable, with upper limits of 3.03 M_{🜨} for b, 1.24 M_{🜨} for c, 11.35 M_{🜨} for d, and 9.70 M_{🜨} for e.

In October 2017, "Sónar Calling GJ273b", a project by METI and the Sónar music festival in Barcelona, Spain transmitted a series of radio signals towards Luyten's star from a radar antenna at Ramfjordmoen, Norway. The signal consisted of a scientific and mathematical tutorial on how to decode the messages and was accompanied by 33 encoded musical compositions by various musicians. A second signal series was transmitted in May 2018. Were anyone listening, the soonest response would be received by 2042.

== See also ==
- List of nearest stars
