= Evolution: What the Fossils Say and Why It Matters =

2007 book by Donald Prothero

- Author: Donald Prothero, Carl Buell
- Illustrator: Carl Buell
- Language: English
- Subject: Evolutionary paleobiology
- Publisher: Columbia University Press
- Publication date: 2007
- Pages: 381
- ISBN: 978-0231139625

Evolution: What the Fossils Say and Why It Matters is a 2007 book by American paleontologist Donald Prothero where he documents the evolutionary history of fossil vertebrates.

== Summary ==
Evolution: What the Fossils Say and Why It Matters was written as a response to Duane Gish's 1995 book Evolution: The Fossils Still Say No! It is dedicated to Niles Eldredge and Stephen Jay Gould to recognize their contributions to the fields of paleontology and evolutionary biology. The foreword, written by Michael Shermer, is titled Why People Do Not Accept Evolution.

The book is divided into two sections. In section one Prothero provides a detailed description of evolution and its relationship to the study of biology. The second section provides a distinct discussion of the fossil record. In a review of the book Peter Dodson says "Prothero points out that the evolution of horses, elucidated since the 1870s, remains one of the finest demonstrations of evolutionary change over time."

Prothero is well prepared to cover the topic due to his knowledge of the fossil record, geology, biogeography, embryology, contemporary abiogenetic theory and Biblical origins.

One example of the compelling presentations in the book is Prothero's illustrated discussion of tiktaalik, otherwise known as the "fish with legs", which includes a cladogram that clearly shows where it fits in relation to other organisms.

== Reviews ==
Science writer Crispian Jago said in his book review that "This book presents a sheer cliff face of overwhelming evidence all consistently backing up Darwin's great theory". In a review for Skeptic magazine, Tim Callahan remarked that "Prothero has, in this lavishly illustrated text, delivered arguments for the theory of evolution that have the impact of a steam-roller."
