= H. Allen Orr =

American evolutionary biologist

- Born: 11 July 1960 (age 66); Hampton, Virginia, U.S.
- Education: College of William and Mary (BA); University of Chicago (PhD)
- Known for: Showing that Fisher’s theory of modifier genes could not account for recessivity and dominance
- Awards: Dobzhansky Prize of the Society for the Study of Evolution; Young Investigator Prize of the American Society of Naturalists; Darwin-Wallace Medal of the Linnean Society
- Scientific career
- Fields: Evolutionary biology, Genetics
- Workplaces: University of California, Davis, University of Rochester
- Doctoral advisor: Jerry Coyne

H. Allen Orr (born 1960) is an American evolutionary biologist specializing in the genetics of speciation and adaptation. He is the Shirley Cox Kearns Professor of Biology at the University of Rochester.

== Education and career ==
Orr earned his bachelor's degree in biology and philosophy from the College of William and Mary and his Ph.D. in biology from the University of Chicago. At Chicago, Orr studied under Jerry Coyne. He performed postdoctoral research at the University of California, Davis.

== Work ==
Orr is an evolutionary geneticist whose research focuses on the genetics of speciation and the genetics of adaptation, in particular on the genetic basis of hybrid sterility and inviability. How many genes cause reproductive isolation between species? What are the normal functions of these genes and what evolutionary forces drove their divergence? He studies these problems through genetic analysis of reproductive isolation between species of Drosophila.

In his adaptation work, Orr is interested in theoretical rules or patterns that might characterize the population genetics of adaptation. He studies these patterns using both population genetic theory and experiment. His early work on Drosophila set the terms of much of the current research on speciation. Orr is said to be one of the few evolutionary biologists ever to have made fundamental contributions about how changes occur within lineages over time, and about how lineages split to result in new species.

=== Speciation ===
His book Speciation, co-authored with Jerry Coyne, was hailed in Science as "exceedingly well-written and persuasive". They consider that studying speciation is largely synonymous with studying reproductive isolation, and explore what we know about where, when, and how isolating barriers evolve. Following Ernst Mayr they argue that speciation usually occurs where populations are geographically isolated or allopatric. They present evidence for the primacy of natural and sexual selection over genetic drift in driving speciation. Signatures of positive selection on genes involved in postzygotic isolation and reproductive proteins as well as experimental evidence from both the lab and field connect adaptation and sexual selection to reproductive isolation. They also present evidence for the congruence of the Dobzhansky-Muller model for the evolution of postzygotic isolation with the genetics of hybrid incompatibilities in many natural systems. Results that support their conclusions in the book continue to be published.

=== Fisher's theory of dominance ===
According to R. A. Fisher's theory of dominance, genes in diploid organisms may be recessive as an effect of hypothetical regulator genes. In 1981 Kacser and Burns gave convincing theoretical arguments why the explanation for dominance lay in simple biochemistry rather than in Fisher's more complicated genetic theory. Orr put this on an experimental basis with studies of Chlamydomonas reinhardtii, an alga that exists almost exclusively as a haploid organism, but which passes through occasional diploid generations. He found that the great majority of genes in diploid cells were recessive, contradicting Fisher's theory.

== Awards and recognition ==
Orr has been the recipient of a Guggenheim Fellowship, a David and Lucile Packard Fellowship, an Alfred P. Sloan Foundation Postdoctoral Fellowship, and a Rockefeller Foundation Scholar in Residence Fellowship at Bellagio Study Center, Italy. He was awarded the Dobzhansky Prize by the Society for the Study of Evolution and the Young Investigator Prize by the American Society of Naturalists. He was also named Professor of the Year in Natural Sciences by the Student Association at University of Rochester in 2002. In 2008 he was one of thirteen recipients of the Darwin-Wallace Medal, which is bestowed every 50 years by the Linnean Society of London.

== Publications ==
Orr is widely published in some of the leading scientific journals including Nature, Science and PNAS.

=== Books ===
- Speciation. 2004. ISBN 0-87893-091-4.

=== Scientific publications ===
Orr's papers include:

- "A test of Fisher’s theory of dominance", PNAS
- "Haldane's rule has multiple genetic causes", Nature
- "A mathematical model of Haldane's rule", Evolution
- "The evolutionary genetics of speciation", Phil. Trans. Roy. Soc. Lond. B
- "The population genetics of adaptation: the distribution of factors fixed during adaptive evolution", Evolution
- "Haldane's rule is obeyed in taxa lacking a hemizygous X", Science
- "Morphological innovation and developmental genetics", PNAS
- "Adaptive evolution drives divergence of a hybrid inviability gene in Drosophila", Nature
