= Donald Prothero =

American paleontologist, geologist, and author (born 1954)

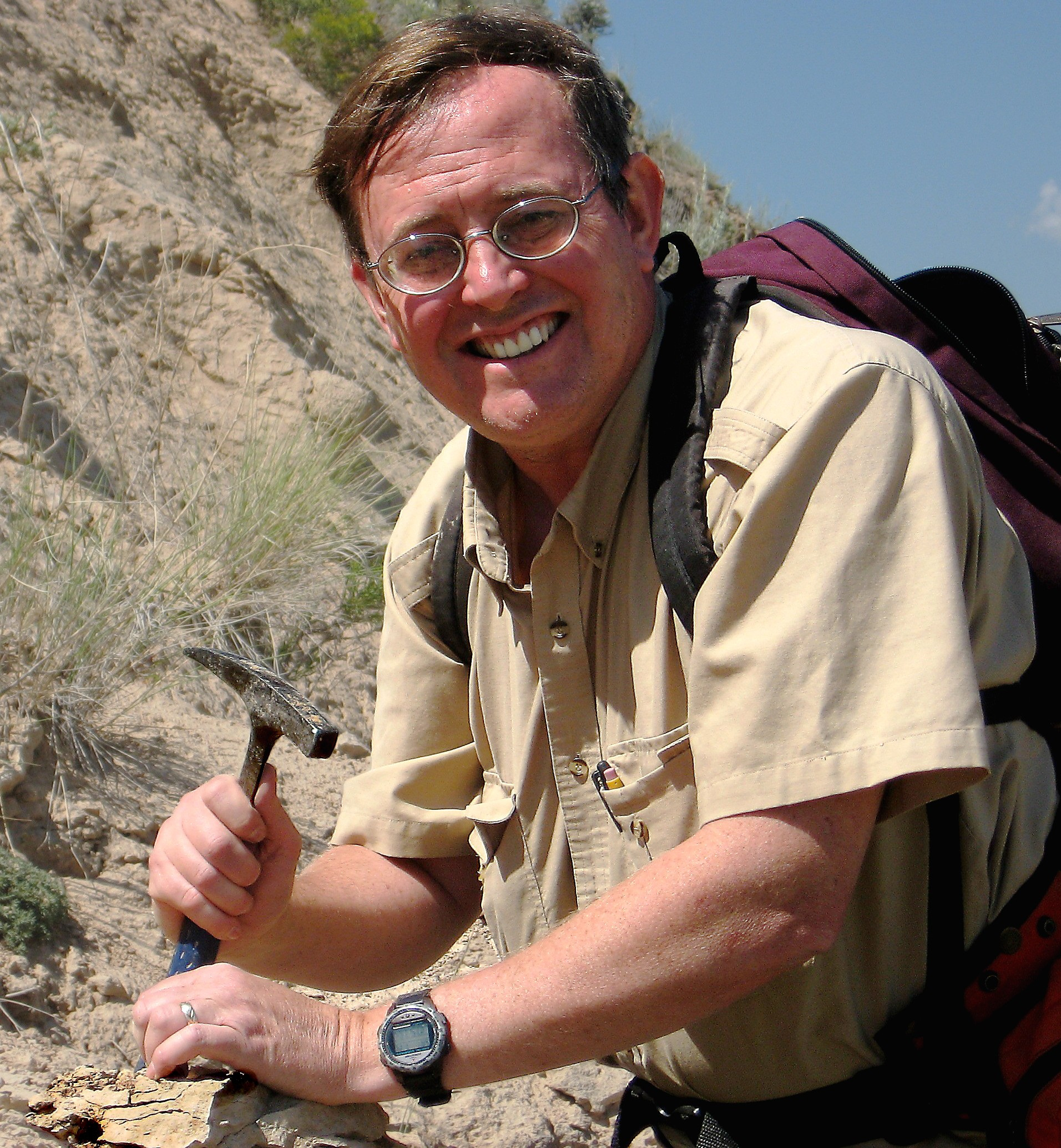
- Prothero in 2008
- Born: February 21, 1954 (age 72); Glendale, California, U.S.
- Citizenship: American
- Education: University of California, Riverside, Columbia University
- Known for: Mammalian paleontology
- Scientific career
- Thesis: Medial Oligocene magnetostratigraphy and mammalian biostratigraphy: testing the isochroneity of mammalian biostratigraphic events
- Website: http://www.donaldprothero.com/

Donald Ross Prothero (February 21, 1954) is an American geologist, paleontologist, and author who specializes in mammalian paleontology and magnetostratigraphy, a technique to date rock layers of the Cenozoic era and its use to date the climate changes which occurred 30–40 million years ago. He is the author or editor of more than 30 books and over 300 scientific papers, including at least 5 geology textbooks.

Stephen Jay Gould cited Prothero's research on the lack of response to climate change in mammals from the Eocene, Oligocene and Pleistocene epochs to support the punctuated equilibrium model of evolution. He called Prothero "the best punctuated equilibrium researcher on the West Coast".

== Biography ==
Prothero grew up in the Glendale, California, area, the son of Clifford R. Prothero (1920–2004), a technical illustrator for Lockheed, and Shirley M. (McDonald) Prothero (1924–2016), an artist and homemaker. He attended the University of California, Riverside, where he studied paleontology under Dr. Michael O. Woodburne and Dr. Michael Murphy and earned Phi Beta Kappa during his junior year. He received his Ph.D. in geological sciences in 1982 from Columbia University, New York.

In 1991, he appeared on the television game show Jeopardy! and defeated Ben Stein on the show Win Ben Stein's Money in 1999. He was also featured in the Mr. Deity and the Flood episode of the video series Mr. Deity. Further, he debated the Young Earth creationist Duane Gish early in his career.

For 27 years, he was a member of the faculty at Occidental College and he previously taught at California Institute of Technology, Knox College, Vassar College and Columbia University where he led many undergraduate paleontological and geological field trips. He is currently a research associate in vertebrate paleontology at the Natural History Museum of Los Angeles County.

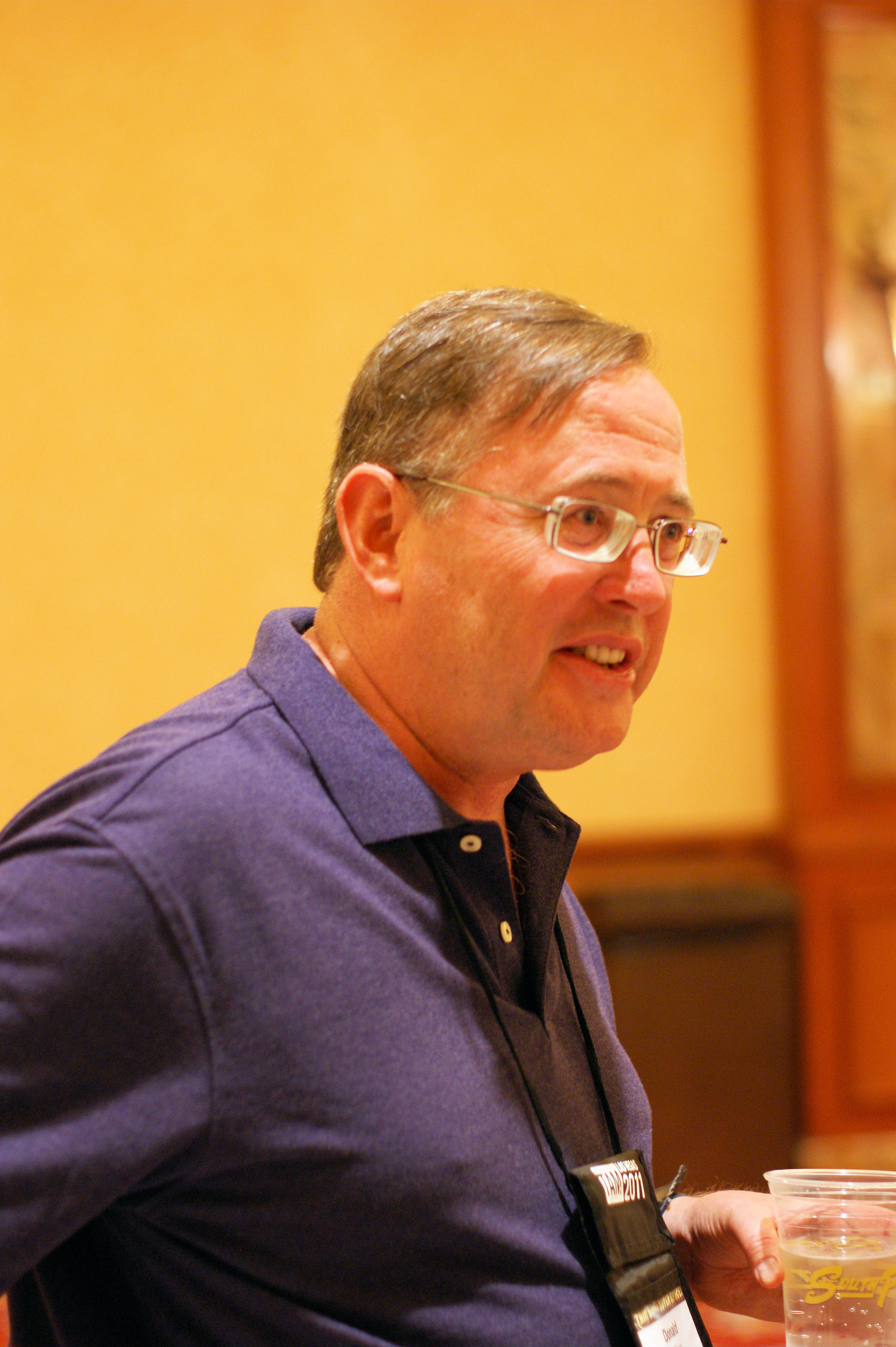
Prothero at TAM 9

== Work ==
=== Evolution ===
Prothero was one of the earliest paleontologists to use the concept of palaeomagnetism in the study of continental rocks. Palaeomagnetism uses the microscopic iron within sedimentary rock to read the alignment of the magnetic field and correlate that with the known history of the polarity reversals of the Earth's magnetic field. The magnetic reversals are precisely dated and consistent worldwide which allows these rocks to be studied in climate science and evolution.

In addition to his research in magnetostratigraphy, another area of Prothero's research is the evolution of hoofed mammals, especially rhinos, camels, peccaries, and horses. Through studying the large collection of fossils in the American Museum of Natural History assembled by Childs Frick, Prothero and his colleagues documented the diversity of North American camels in The Evolution Of North American Camels published in 2026 by the New Mexico Museum of Natural History and Science. One example is a camel once found in the Oklahoma and Texas panhandles, Vampyrocamelus welshi, which were long-necked camels with prominent blade-like canine and pre-molar teeth.

Prothero's work on documenting evolutionary history of fossil vertebrates was cited by Richard Dawkins in his book The Greatest Show on Earth: the Evidence of Evolution. Skeptic Society founder Michael Shermer called Prothero's 2007 book, Evolution: What the Fossils Say and Why It Matters, "the best book ever produced on the subject."

He has also been featured as a scientific consultant and was interviewed on several television documentaries, including the Are Rhinos Dinos? episode of TLC's Paleoworld, the History Channel's Prehistoric Monsters Revealed, the episodes of National Geographic's Prehistoric Predators covering the entelodon and hyaenodon, the series Walking with Prehistoric Beasts on BBC, and the amphicyon or Bear Dog episode of Monsters Resurrected.

In October 2012, Prothero appeared in his capacity as a paleontologist on Conspiracy Road Trip, a BBC television documentary in which five individuals who self-identified as Creationists participated in a road trip along the western coast of the United States, meeting with various experts on the topic, exchanging views and questions with people holding differing views.

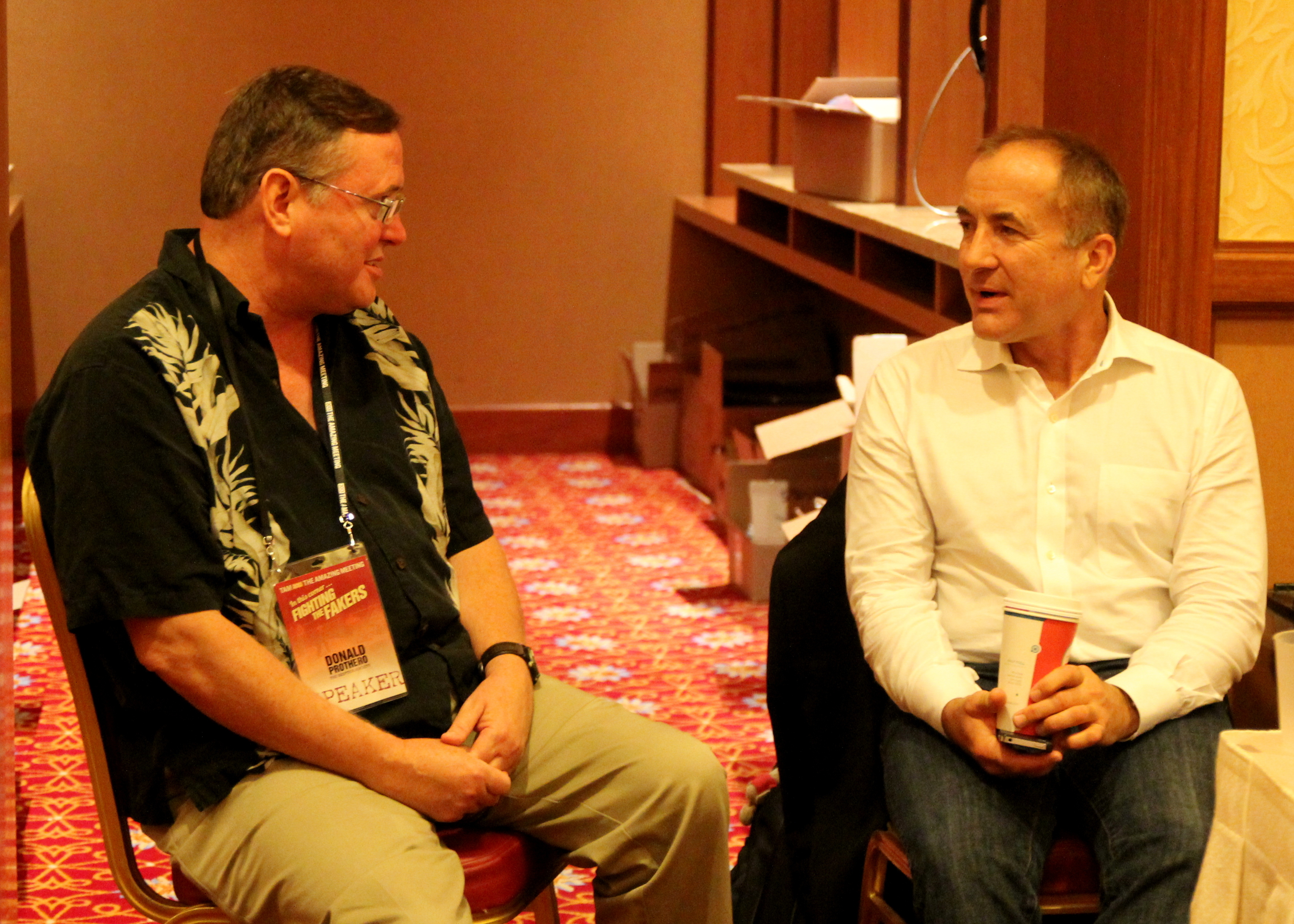
Prothero and Michael Shermer at TAM 2013

=== Cryptozoology ===
Prothero has frequently written about the topic of cryptozoology, a pseudoscience and subculture, which he categorizes along with Holocaust denial and UFO abductions claims as aspects of American culture that are "clearly baloney".

Prothero's 2013 book with Daniel Loxton, Abominable Science: The Origin of Yeti, Nessie, and Other Cryptids discusses the subculture in depth. In a review by Adrienne Mayor of Stanford University, she describes the book as "An entertaining, educational, passionate, and valuable handbook for readers interested getting a scientific perspective on the field of cryptozoology. With marvelous artwork and deeply researched histories of the various creatures, this is an impressive and authoritative book."

=== Anthropogenic global warming ===
Prothero looks at the evidence regarding global warming and the role humans have had on it. In his book Greenhouse of the Dinosaurs, Prothero states "geologists and paleoclimatologists know a lot about past greenhouse worlds, and the icehouse planet that has existed for the past 33 million years. We have a good understanding of how and why the Antarctic ice sheet first appeared at that time, and how the Arctic froze over about 3.5 million years ago, beginning the 24 glacial and interglacial episodes of the 'Ice Ages' that have occurred since then." In his article in eSkeptic, Prothero details carbon dioxide increases, melting polar icecaps, melting glaciers and sea level rise as some of the more important areas that point to anthropogenic global warming. He also goes into details to outline climate change deniers' arguments and rebuttals to those arguments and finally talks about why people deny climate change.

=== Skepticism ===
Prothero grew up in a Presbyterian household, but eventually became an atheist. He became involved in the skeptical movement in the mid-1990s, when Michael Shermer invited him to join the editorial board of The Skeptics Society. His first appearance as a panelist at The Amazing Meeting was in 2010.

As a result of Prothero's books about evolution in 2007 and climate change in 2009, he recognized that "those same people who were denying evolution are often the exact same people who deny climate [change]." This realization led him to research and author "Reality Check: How Science Deniers Threaten Our Future" in 2013 as he explained during an interview on the podcast Skepticality:

There are lots of people out there who accept science when it's convenient, but there's a lot of things that science tells us they don't want to hear and so then they reject those so-called inconvenient truths. And so this sort of weird, little way of doing things is not only true of creationists, it's true of climate deniers, it's true of AIDS deniers, anti-vaxxers, a whole bunch of various kinds of alternative medicines—it's a very common thread. And many of them have very similar strategies in the way they battle against the reality of science... this is a scary thing because they will accept what science has done in the way of "give us progress" and "give us technology" and "give us transportation", and yet they just don't want science when it gets in the way of ideology or religion.

In 2015, Prothero was elected a fellow of the Committee for Skeptical Inquiry.

== Selected publications ==
- Vertebrate Evolution: From Origins to Dinosaurs and Beyond, CRC Press, 2022,
- When Humans Nearly Vanished: The Catastrophic Explosion of the Toba Volcano, Smithsonian, 2018, ISBN 978-1-58834-635-3
- Rhinoceros Giants: The Paleobiology of Indricotheres, Indiana University Press, Bloomington, Indiana, 2013, ISBN 978-0253008190
- Abominable Science: The Origin of Yeti, Nessie, and Other Cryptids, with Daniel Loxton, Columbia Univ. Press, New York, 2013, ISBN 978-0231153201
- Reality Check: How Science Deniers Threaten our Future, Indiana University Press, Bloomington, Indiana, 2013, ISBN 978-0253010292, 978-0801896927
- Catastrophes!: Earthquakes, Tsunamis, Tornadoes, and Other Earth-Shattering Disasters, The Johns Hopkins University Press, 2011, ASIN B00AZWHMY0
- Greenhouse of the Dinosaurs: Evolution, Extinction, and the Future of Our Planet, Columbia University Press, New York, 2009 ISBN 978-0231146609
- Evolution: What the Fossils Say And Why It Matters, Columbia University Press, New York, 2007, ISBN 978-0231139625
- After the Dinosaurs: The Age of Mammals, Indiana University Press, Bloomington, Indiana, 2006, ISBN 978-0253347336
- The Eocene-Oligocene Transition: Paradise Lost, Columbia University Press, New York, 1993, ISBN 978-0231080910

=== Textbooks ===
- Evolution of the Earth, McGraw-Hill, 2003, ISBN 0072528087
- Bringing Fossils To Life: An Introduction To Paleobiology, McGraw-Hill Science/Engineering/Math, 2003, ISBN 0073661708
- Sedimentary Geology, W.H. Freeman, ISBN 0716739054
- Interpreting the Stratigraphic Record, W.H. Freeman & Co., New York, 1990, ISBN 0716718545
- Earth: Portrait of a Planet (first edition), W.W. Norton & Company, New York, 2001, ISBN 0393974235
- California's Amazing Geology, CRC Press, 2017 ISBN 9781498707916

== Boards ==
Prothero is on the editorial board of Skeptic magazine, and in the past has served as an associate or technical editor for such scientific journals as Geology, Paleobiology, and Journal of Paleontology. His fellowships include the Geological Society of America, the Paleontological Society, the Linnean Society of London (1987), the Guggenheim Foundation (1988), the Committee for Skeptical Inquiry, and the National Science Foundation.

He served as the president and vice president of the Pacific Section of Society for Sedimentary Geology, and five years as the program chair for the Society of Vertebrate Paleontology. He has also been a member of Society for the Study of Mammalian Evolution since 2005.

== Critical reception ==
Prothero's 2005 work The Evolution of North American Rhinoceroses received critical attention in the Journal of Paleontology, where Professor David Froehlich lauded the book's comprehensive coverage of North American rhinoceros species, but noted that the work would be less likely to appeal to nonspecialists, for whom the "bulk of the book" is likely to be "more than most would like to know about North American rhinos." However, Froehlich wrote that for those "who need this kind of detail, this book is virtually unmatched and indispensable," noting that his "one real quibble" was the "lack of an overall discussion of rhinoceros evolution" that was geographically comprehensive, which Froehlich thought would "put these organisms in a global context for the nonspecialist."

A May 2009 Reports of the National Center for Science Education review of Prothero's Evolution: What the Fossils Say and Why it Matters described Prothero as "equal to his task" of providing resources for evaluating the fossil record, and praised the book's breadth of coverage of its topic. Although the reviewer criticized Prothero's treatment of creationist claims for the book's "polemical tone" and "contempt" for religion-based opponents of the biological sciences, he also noted that Prothero "is well versed in the history of science and religion and makes it clear that he sees no necessary conflict between science and religion."

In a review of Prothero's 2011 book Catastrophes!: Earthquakes, Tsunamis, Tornadoes, and Other Earth-Shattering Disasters for the American Library Association, Prothero is described as "seiz[ing] teaching opportunities" to explain the methods involved with taking metrics of the types of disasters discussed. While the reviewer praised Prothero for his approach to these topics and "recommended" the work, Prothero's "presentation becomes more complex" as the book discusses ice ages and global warming according to the reviewer, who states that "with all scientists convinced that warming is occurring as a result of human action, [...] he disparages the denialists."

== Awards and honors ==
Prothero has received a number of honors for his research as well as his lectures and books. In 1991, he received the Charles Schuchert Award of the Paleontological Society for the outstanding paleontologist under the age of 40. His book Evolution: What the Fossils Say and Why it Matters received the 2007 PSP award for excellence in earth science from the Association of American Publishers.

In 2013 he received the Diamond Award for Distinguished Achievement in Science and Technology from the Glendale Unified School District. The National Association of Geoscience Teachers selected him for the 2013 James Shea Award. His lectures on topics like evolution, fossil mammals and climate change have been featured at the Skeptic Society Lecture Series and at The Amaz!ng Meeting as well as the Paleontological Society where he was named a Distinguished Speaker in 1993–1994.

Prothero was awarded the 2015 Joseph T Gregory Service Award honoring his outstanding service to the welfare of the Society of Vertebrate Paleontology. In 2016 he was awarded the Friend of Darwin award from the National Center for Science Education, with NCSE's executive director Ann Reid saying "it would be hard to think of anyone who has contributed as much to the public understanding of the paleontological evidence for evolution and against creationism as Don Prothero." He was also named a fellow of the Committee for Skeptical Inquiry citing his "distinguished contributions to science and skepticism."

The Committee for Skeptical Inquiry (CSI) awarded Tim Callahan and Prothero the Robert P. Balles Annual Prize in Critical Thinking for their book UFOs, Chemtrails, and Aliens. CSI stated this book "not only refute(s) false claims and misguided beliefs ... but more importantly they also arm readers with the tools they will need to fairly evaluate any extraordinary claim they come across". The $2,500 prize will be awarded at the CSICon conference in Las Vegas, October 2018.
