= Ariel Waldman =

Science communicator

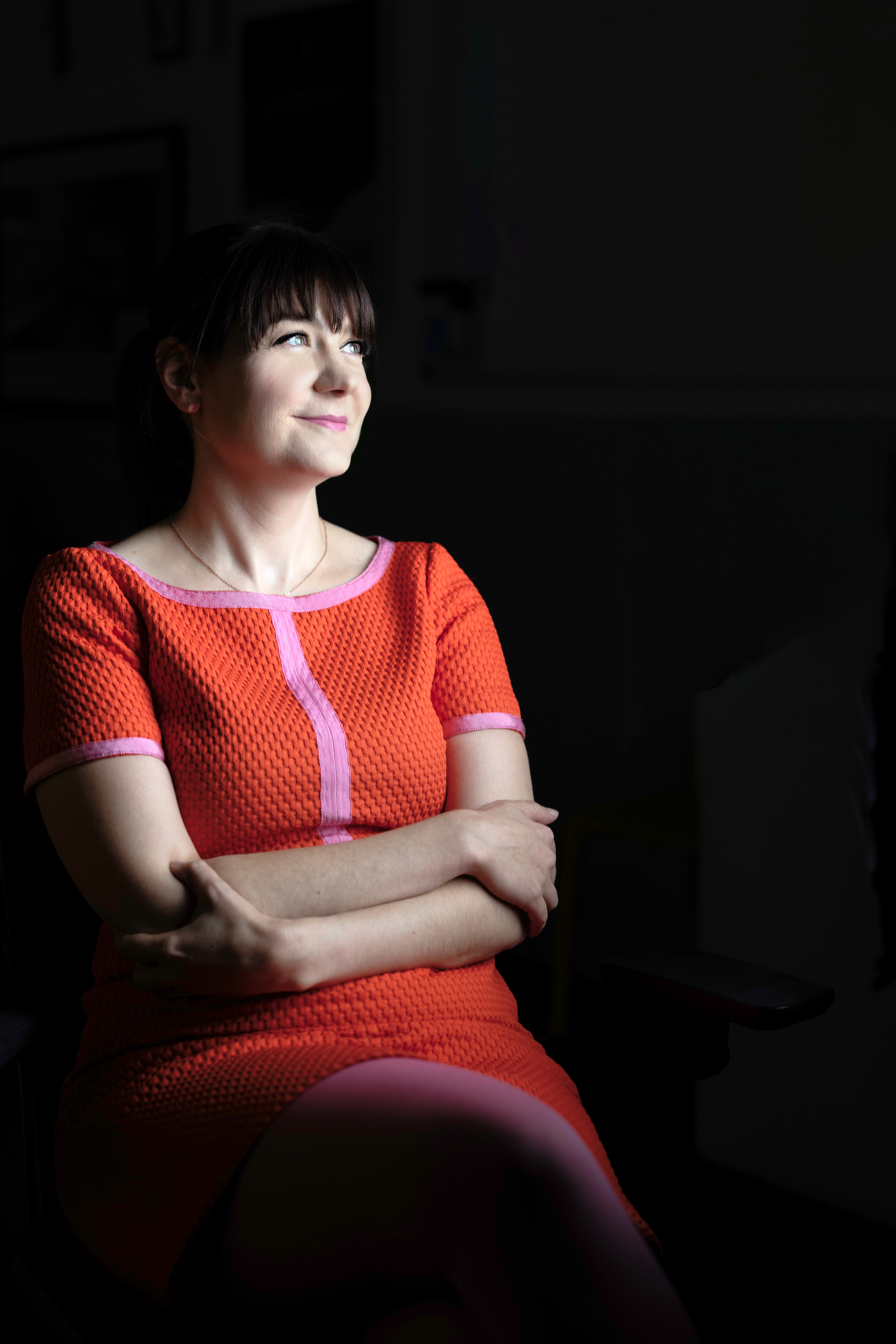
- Ariel Waldman at her studio in 2024
- Education: Graphic designer
- Occupations: Explorer, filmmaker and writer
- Known for: Science Hack Day
- Notable work: Antarctica Unearthed; What’s It Like in Space?; Life Under The Ice
- Website: arielwaldman.com

Ariel Waldman is an explorer, filmmaker and writer specializing in the intersection of science, space, technology and art. She describes herself as "on a mission to make science and space exploration disruptively accessible."

Ariel Waldman is the director of “Antarctica Unearthed”, a nature documentary about the McMurdo Dry Valleys, which she filmed entirely solo without a film crew during her two month expedition as a researcher with the McMurdo Dry Valleys LTER team. In 2024, the documentary was awarded “Official Selection” at Wildscreen Festival.

She is the creator and host of Life Unearthed with Ariel Waldman, a PBS nature and wildlife series described as "a science-driven docu-series revealing Earth's ecosystems through radical shifts in scale—from microscopic wildlife to the planet's most iconic animals—and even the possibilities of life beyond Earth."

In 2018, she traveled to Antarctica for five weeks as a principal investigator with the National Science Foundation's Antarctic Artists and Writers program. She climbed glaciers and camped in the Dry Valleys in order to photograph microbes living in extreme environments. The resulting project, Life Under the Ice, features microscopy photos of bacteria, diatoms, tardigrades and other Antarctic life forms, and was the topic of her 2020 TED Talk, "The Invisible Life Hidden Beneath Antarctica's Ice".

Waldman is the global director of Science Hack Day, which organizes events worldwide to bring together people to make things using science. The idea sprang from a South by Southwest panel she organized in 2010 on how to make use of open data. She is also the founder of SpaceHack.org, a directory of ways for anyone to participate in space exploration.

Waldman has been a National Geographic Explorer since 2018. She formerly chaired the external council for NASA's Innovative Advanced Concepts program, which provides grants to develop innovative ideas in aerospace that could transform future NASA missions. She co-authored "Pathways to Exploration," a 2014 report from the National Academies on the future of human spaceflight.

In 2013, Waldman received an honor from the Obama White House for being a Champion of Change in citizen science, "for her dedication to increasing public engagement in science and science literacy." She is a graduate of the Art Institute of Pittsburgh.

== Books ==
- What's It Like in Space? Stories from Astronauts Who've Been There. ISBN 9781452144764 (April 2016), including illustrations by Brian Standeford.
- Out There: The Science Behind Sci-Fi Film and TV. ISBN 9780762481675 (August 2023), with foreword by Mae Jemison.
