= Only A Theory =

2008 book by Kenneth R. Miller

Only A Theory: Evolution and the Battle for America's Soul
- Cover
- Author: Kenneth R. Miller
- Language: English
- Subjects: Creationism; Evolution
- Publisher: Penguin Group
- Publication date: 12 June 2008
- Publication place: United States
- Media type: Print (hardcover)
- Pages: 256
- ISBN: 978-0-670-01883-3
- Preceded by: Finding Darwin's God

Only A Theory: Evolution and the Battle for America's Soul is a 2008 book by the American cell biologist and Roman Catholic Kenneth R. Miller. In the book, Miller examines the battle between evolution and intelligent design (ID), and explores the implications of the battle for science in America. The title of the book references the common misconception of what "theory" means in the context of science and evolution.

== Reception ==
Glenn C. Altschuler reviewed the book saying "Though I.D. trumpets its connections to information theory, biochemistry and molecular biology, Miller concludes, as did Judge John Jones in Kitzmiller v. Dover, it rests, ultimately, on ignorance. Extending an olive branch to religious Americans, Miller suggests that evolution and faith aren't really in conflict because all of nature is part of God's providential plan."

Biologist PZ Myers wrote "Miller is a fine writer who sharply addresses the details of the arguments about intelligent design creationism. When tackling old chestnuts such as the 'only a theory' complaint, or Michael Behe's argument for a maximum limit for the number of genetic mutations, or William Dembski's rehash of William Paley's watchmaker argument for complexity, Miller discusses the contemporary biological explanations while refuting the errors."

A number of reviewers had pointed out a factual inaccuracy in the book: on page 149, Miller referred to the Dingo as a marsupial, when in fact Dingos are feral dogs. In his list of errata, published online, Miller gave a correct reading of the passage: "It produced hunter-predator marsupials like the dingo and the Tasmanian tiger," should read "It produced hunter-predator marsupials like the tiger quoll and the Tasmanian wolf."

On June 16, 2008, Miller was interviewed on The Colbert Report discussing the book.
