= Jerry Coyne =

American biologist (born 1949)

Jerry A. Coyne
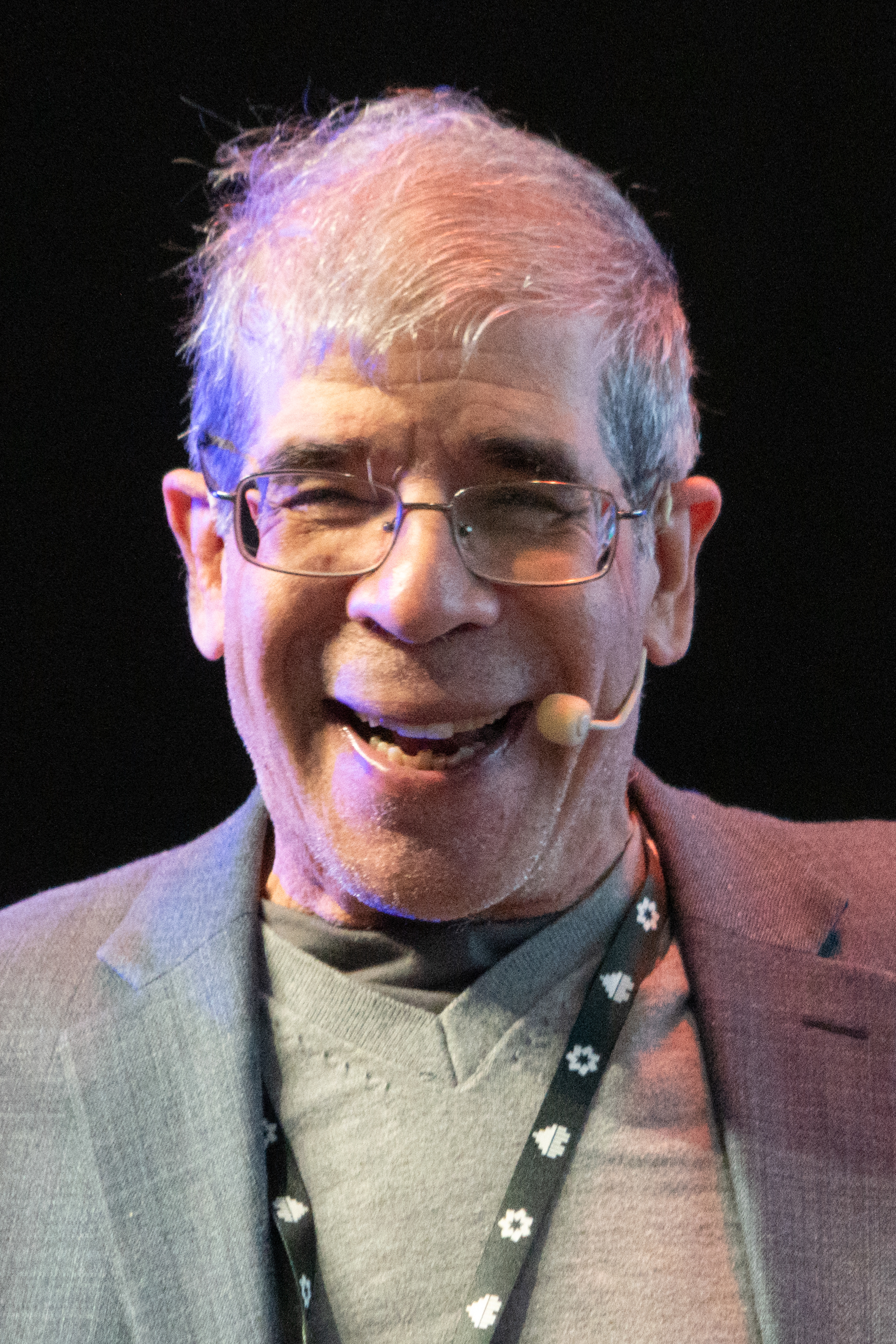
- Coyne in 2024
- Born: Jerry Allen Coyne; December 30, 1949 (age 76)
- Education: College of William & Mary (BS); Harvard University (PhD)
- Known for: Speciation and evolutionary genetics, particularly as they involve the fruit fly, Drosophila, and the books: Speciation; Why Evolution is True; Faith versus Fact: Why Science and Religion Are Incompatible
- Awards: Richard Dawkins Award (2015)
- Scientific career
- Fields: Ecology; Evolution
- Institutions: University of Chicago; University of Maryland
- Doctoral advisor: Richard Lewontin
- Notable students: H. Allen Orr, Mohamed Noor
- Website: whyevolutionistrue.com

Jerry Allen Coyne (born December 30, 1949) is an American biologist and skeptic known for his work on speciation and his commentary on intelligent design. A professor emeritus of ecology and evolution at the University of Chicago, he has published on the theory of evolution. His concentration is speciation and ecological and evolutionary genetics, particularly as they involve the fruit fly, Drosophila. In 2023 he became a fellow with the Committee for Skeptical Inquiry.

He is the author of the text Speciation and the bestselling non-fiction book Why Evolution Is True. Coyne maintains a website and writes for his blog, also called Why Evolution Is True. He is a hard determinist.

Coyne gained attention outside of the scientific community as a public critic of religion. As a proponent of New Atheism, he is often cited with atheists such as Richard Dawkins and Sam Harris. He is the author of the book Faith Versus Fact.

== Early life and education ==
Jerry Allen Coyne was born December 30, 1949. He was raised by Jewish parents. He graduated with a B.S. in biology from the College of William & Mary in 1971, receiving the Botetourt Medal for academic achievement. According to Coyne, while in college, he was involved in activism against apartheid and protested against the Vietnam War. His graduate work at Rockefeller University under Theodosius Dobzhansky was interrupted when he was drafted. He earned a Ph.D. in biology at Harvard University in 1978, studying under Richard Lewontin, and went on to do a postdoctoral fellowship at the University of California, Davis, with Timothy Prout.

== Career ==
Coyne was awarded a Guggenheim Fellowship in 1988. He was elected to the American Academy of Arts and Sciences in 2007. He received the Emperor Has No Clothes Award from the Freedom from Religion Foundation in 2011.

Coyne has served as Vice President (1996) and President (2011) of the Society for the Study of Evolution. He has been associate editor of the publications Evolution (1985–1988; 1994–2000) and The American Naturalist (1990–1993). He has taught evolutionary biology, speciation, genetic analysis, social issues and scientific knowledge, scientific speaking and writing. He considers evolutionary biology to be "... more like the fine arts of science, in that it's aesthetically quite satisfying, but it also happens to be true, which is an extra bonus."

His writing has been published in the scientific journals Nature, and Science, as well as news and magazine publications including The New York Times, the Times Literary Supplement, and The New Republic. His research interests include population and evolutionary genetics, speciation, ecological and quantitative genetics, chromosome evolution, and sperm competition.

Coyne was a consultant for the defense during the murder trial of O. J. Simpson and expressed concerns that the DNA evidence implicating Simpson could be faulty. In 2024, shortly after Simpson's death, Coyne shared his belief that Simpson was "guilty as hell" and the verdict was "a miscarriage of justice largely due to the incompetence of the prosecution", which had caused him to refuse subsequent requests to serve as an expert witness.

In a 1996 critique of the theory of intelligent-design creationism, Coyne wrote a New Republic article on Of Pandas and People (a book review), which started a long history of writing on evolution and creationism.

The Ecuadoran frog Atelopus coynei is named after Coyne, who collected the holotype in a swamp on a frogging trip to western Ecuador as a student in the late 1970s.

== Critiques of creationism ==
Coyne is a critic of creationism, theistic evolution, and intelligent design, which he calls "the latest pseudoscientific incarnation of religious creationism, cleverly crafted by a new group of enthusiasts to circumvent recent legal restrictions."

== Beliefs ==
=== Atheism and skepticism ===
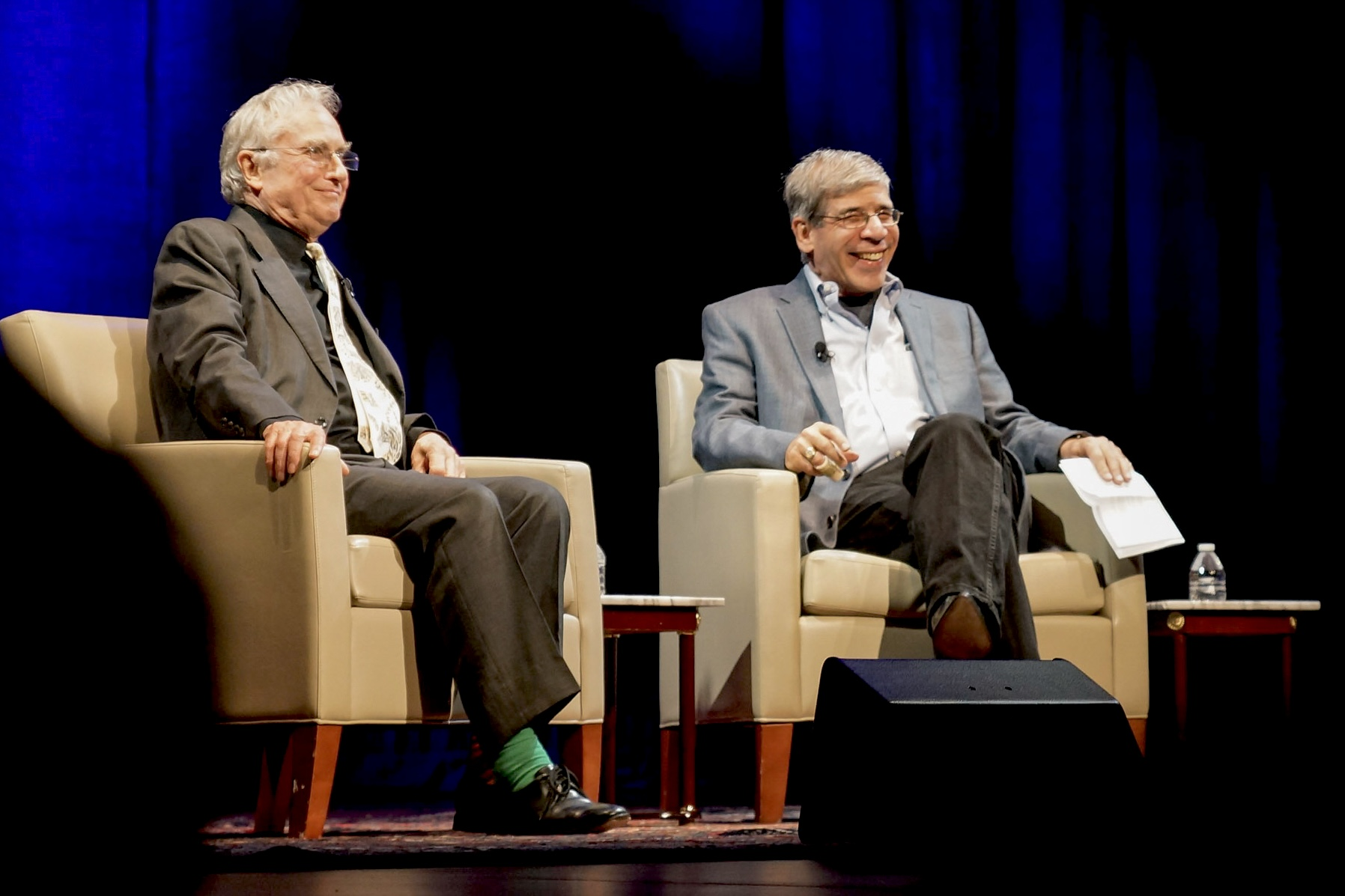
Coyne (right) and Richard Dawkins at George Washington University on May 24, 2017

Coyne considers himself a secular Jew, and an outspoken anti-theist. As a proponent of New Atheism, he is often cited with atheists such as Richard Dawkins and Sam Harris. He supports the theses of metaphysical naturalism and the conflict thesis. He claims that religion and science are fundamentally incompatible, that only rational evaluation of evidence is capable of reliably discovering the world and the way it works, and that scientists who hold religious views are only reflective of the idea, "that people can hold two conflicting notions in their heads at the same time" (cognitive dissonance). He has argued that the incompatibility of science and faith is based on irreconcilable differences in methodology, philosophy, and outcomes when they try to discern truths about the universe.

Coyne produces a website in blog format titled Why Evolution Is True. As of January 10, 2023, it had over 73,000 subscribers. On the blog, he has covered subjects spanning science, medical ethics, atheism, determinism, philosophy and free speech.

Coyne is an advocate of skepticism, and has stated that "all scientific progress requires a climate of strong skepticism." He has participated in public forums and debates with theists.

Coyne offers criticism of creationists who appear closed minded by adhering to a literal Biblical view. He questions the creationist concept of animals diverging only within kinds, which is in itself an admission of transitional intermediates between very different groups (i.e., whales and their terrestrial relatives) found throughout the fossil record. In a New Republic article, Coyne wrote that "we have many examples of transitional fossils between what anyone would consider different kinds: fish and amphibians (like Tiktaalik, which Nye mentioned), between amphibians and reptiles, between reptiles and mammals, between reptiles and birds, between land animals and whales, and of course, between early and modern humans, with early fossils showing intermediacy between the features of apelike ancestors and modern humans." Coyne believes that both sides of such debates between evolutionists and young earth creationists could benefit from a better understanding of the fossil record and for modern tools such as Isochron dating. He considers that the inability of creationists to address these subjects fully suggests that "religion can poison one's mind so deeply that it becomes immunized to the real truth about the cosmos."

He has stated that he believes in free speech for all and does not like seeing universities cancel speakers, such as Steve Bannon, because of protests, saying "I can't think of a single person I would urge the University to disinvite. Not a single person – not a white racist, not an anti-immigration person. Free speech has to defend the most odious people."

=== Determinism ===
Coyne is a hard determinist. He came to believe in the idea of determinism after reading a paper by Anthony Cashmore on determinism and the criminal justice system. He states that recognising there is no free will makes one more empathetic and less judgmental: "A lot of politics—particularly Republican politics—is based on the supposition that people are responsible for their own lives. So, for example, people who are on welfare, or homeless people, are treated as if they could have done otherwise. They could have gotten a job, they could have gotten married and had a father for their kids. But they couldn't, because they're victims of circumstance."

=== Sex as binary ===
On December 29, 2024, Coyne wrote an article for the website of the Freedom From Religion Foundation (FFRF) which argued that sex is biological and binary and that trans women were more sexually predatory than other women. The FFRF's presidents removed the article one day later, describing its publication as an error of judgement on their part. Coyne resigned from the board of honorary members in response. His resignation was followed by those of Steven Pinker and Richard Dawkins, after which the FFRF dissolved the honorary board.

== Personal life ==
According to an article in The Chicago Maroon, Coyne retired in 2015 and continues to pursue publishing and work in his lab at the university. He considers himself to be a traditional liberal while also strongly supporting free speech.

During the COVID-19 pandemic, Coyne requested permission to access the University of Chicago's Botany Pond to feed a female duck and her ducklings in the event of a campus lockdown; he had named the mother Honey, and fed the group until they migrated. The university granted his request. Honey has returned for several years to the pond, and Coyne has persisted with feeding the ducks breeding there.

== Bibliography ==
- Coyne, Jerry A.; H. Allen Orr (June 30, 2004). Speciation. Sinauer Associates Inc., Sunderland, Mass. ISBN 978-0-87893-089-0.
- Coyne, Jerry A. (January 22, 2009). Why Evolution is True. Viking, New York (USA); Oxford University Press, Oxford (UK). ISBN 978-0-19-923084-6. OCLC 233549529.
- Coyne, Jerry A. (May 19, 2015). Faith vs. Fact: Why Science and Religion are Incompatible. Viking (USA); Penguin (UK). ISBN 978-0670026531.
