= The Blood of the Nation =

Book by David Starr Jordan

- Author: David Starr Jordan
- Language: English
- Subject: Eugenics, Sociobiology
- Publisher: Popular Science Monthly and American Unitarian Association
- Publication date: 1901 and 1910 (expanded)
- Publication place: US

The Blood of the Nation: A Study in the Decay of Races by the Survival of the Unfit was the title of a number of publications by the American eugenicist David Starr Jordan, the president of Stanford University. His thesis, under the same name, first appeared in the May 1901 edition of Popular Science Monthly. It was republished in book form by the American Unitarian Association in 1902 and again in 1910. It was intended to promote the eugenics movement and bring its aims to a broader non-academic audience.

Jordan hypothesized that much of the social decline after wars stemmed from "the dysgenic effects of that conflict, which destroyed the fittest and left young widows who did not remarry and produce more children." In critiquing Jordan's paper in 2001, Elof Axel Carlson proposed that the term "blood" in the title, "although biologically inaccurate," was deliberately included by the author for "metaphorical value" and to make the concept of "inborn cultural behaviors" accessible to a general reader. Thurtle (2007), referencing Walter Benjamin, claims that the work owes more to the "storytelling" genre than to strictly scientific enquiry.

== Sources ==
- The blood of the nation, a study of the decay of races through the survival of the unfit (1910) at Internet Archive
