= Science Hack Day =

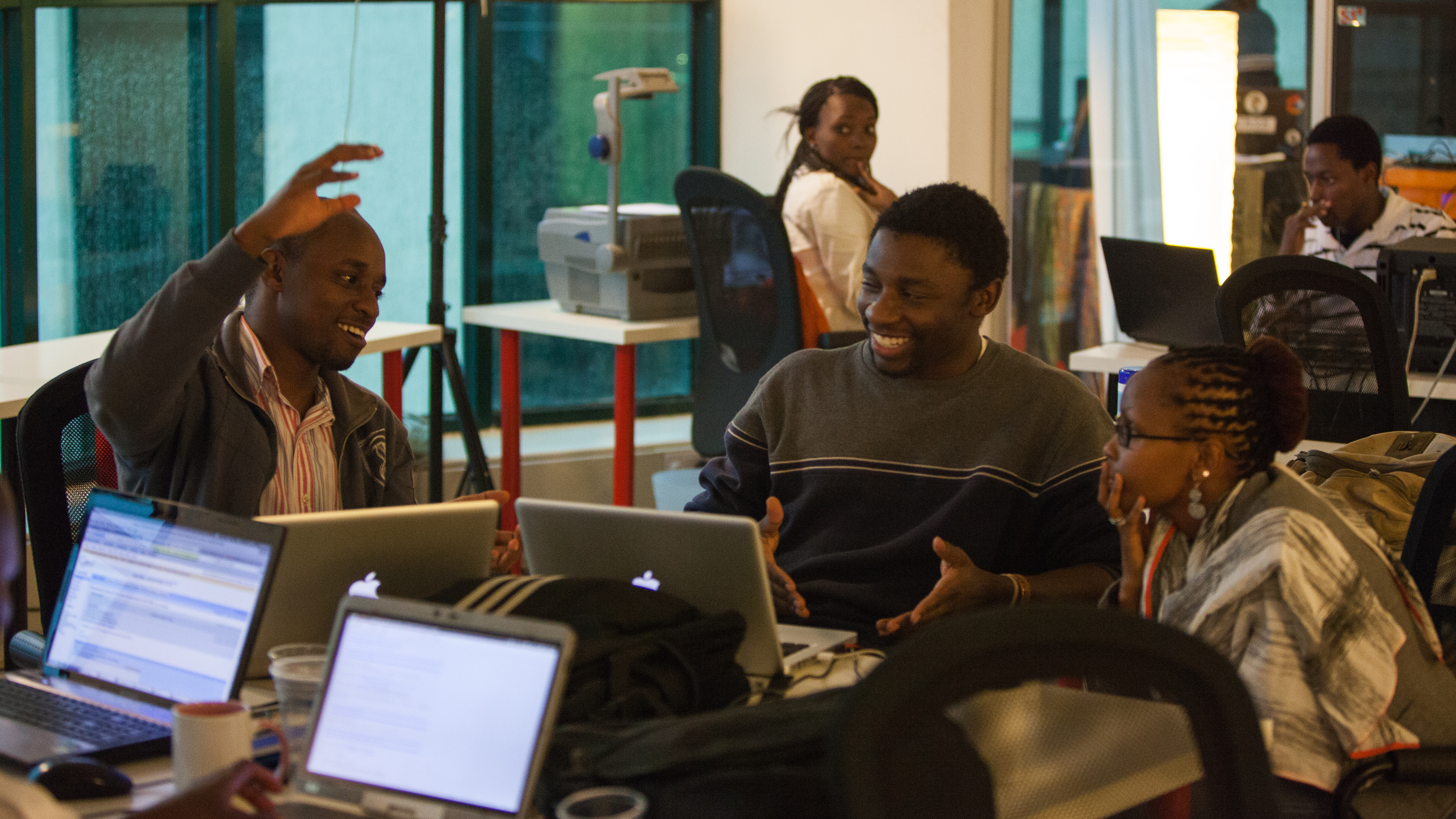
Science Hack Day, Nairobi, 2012

Science Hack Day is a hack day specifically for "making weird, silly or serious things with science". The first was organized by Jeremy Keith and held at the London offices of The Guardian newspaper over the weekend 19/20 June 2010.

The event was attended by around 100 participants who had 24 hours to build new hacks. Many stayed overnight at the venue and over 25 hacks were built, submitted and demo'ed by the end of the weekend.

Soon thereafter a second Science Hack Day was organized by Ariel Waldman in San Francisco, and several years since, often filling up with a waitlist. Since that first year, more than 50 Science Hack Day events have taken place around the world, including a recent 2020 March Science Hack Day Dublin.

The events are attended by a diverse range of science enthusiasts.

== See also ==
- Science Foo Camp
