= Tim Callahan (academic) =

Timothy J. Callahan is an associate professor of geology and environmental geosciences at the College of Charleston in South Carolina. He is director of the college's Master of Environmental Studies program and has interests in hydrogeology, wetlands and water resources.

== Education ==
Callahan holds a Ph.D. in earth and environmental science (2001) and an M.S. in geochemistry from the New Mexico Institute of Mining and Technology (1995), as well as a B.A. in geology from the University of St. Thomas, St. Paul, Minnesota (1991).

== Environmental science ==
Callahan is a member of the American Geophysical Union, the Carolina Geological Society, the Geological Society of America and the Society of Wetland Scientists. He co-authored three papers on hydrology for the 2008 South Carolina Water Resources Conference and has co-authored several other peer-reviewed articles published in the Journal of the American Water Resource Association, the Journal of Geoscience Education, the Journal of Contaminant Hydrology and elsewhere.

== Publications ==
As of November 2025, Scopus lists 32 publications by Callahan, which have been cited 569 times, and a h-index of 15.

=== Selected articles ===
- Storm event analysis of four forested catchments on the Atlantic coastal plain using a modified SCS-CN rainfall-runoff model (Journal of Hydrology: May 2022) Volume 608 with Amatya, D.M. and Walega, A. and Callahan, T.J. and Morrison, A. and Vulava, V. and Hitchcock, D.R. and Williams, T.M. and Epps, T.
- Hydrometeorological trends in a low-gradient forested watershed on the Southeastern Atlantic Coastal Plain in the USA (Hydrology: February 2024) Volume 11 no. 3 with Amatya, Devendra M. and Callahan, Timothy J. and Mukherjee, Sourav and Harrison, Charles A. and Trettin, Carl C. and Wałęga, Andrzej and Młyński, Dariusz and Emmett, Kristen D.
- Seasonality and Predictability of Hydrometeorological and Water Chemistry Indicators in Three Coastal Forested Watersheds (Sustainability: MDPI AG 2024) Volume 16 no. 22 with Wałęga, Andrzej and Amatya, Devendra M. and Trettin, Carl and Callahan, Timothy and Młyński, Dariusz and Vulaya, Vijay
