= The Zoologist's Guide to the Galaxy =

2020 book by Arik Kershenbaum

- Cover of the hardback edition of The Zoologist's Guide to the Galaxy
- Author: Arik Kershenbaum
- Subject: Evolutionary biology Astrobiology
- Genre: Popular science
- Publisher: Viking-Penguin
- Publication date: 2020
- Publication place: UK
- Pages: 368

The Zoologist's Guide to the Galaxy. What Animals on Earth Reveal about Aliens – and Ourselves is a 2020 popular science book by the Cambridge University zoologist Arik Kershenbaum. It discusses the possible nature of life on other planets, based on the study of animal life on Earth.

The book argues that the evolutionary processes that are observed operating on Earth are universal, and a necessary requirement for the presence of complex life on any planet. As a result, many aspects of animal behavior are likely to be present in the equivalent lifeforms on alien planets. This includes certain features of social behavior, communication, and movement, the evolutionary origin of which on Earth is underpinned by universal processes.

The book has been praised by critics for its accessibility and engaging conversational tone, and described by Richard Dawkins as "A wonderfully insightful sidelong look at Earthly biology".

== Author ==
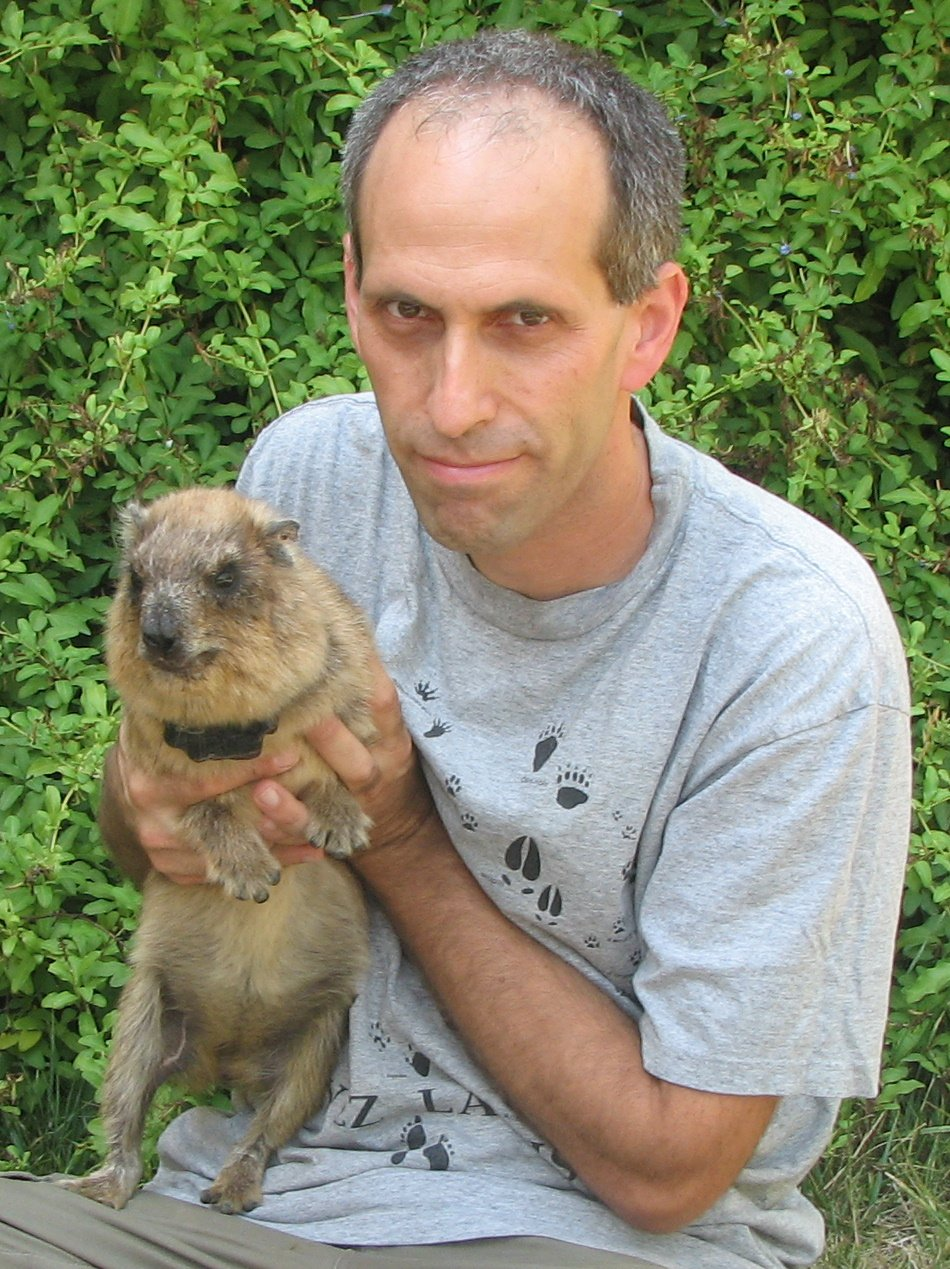
Dr Arik Kershenbaum with a collared rock hyrax

Kershenbaum is a College Lecturer at Girton College, University of Cambridge, and an academic visitor at the Department of Zoology. He studies animal communication and particularly the vocal communication of wolves and dolphins.

== Book ==
=== Context ===
Although the field of astrobiology usually investigates possibilities of simple lifeforms that may exist on alien planets, The Zoologist's Guide to the Galaxy considers the possibilities of complex life, and in particular, life that might be considered as animal life. The book begins by laying out the argument that evolution by natural selection is the only mechanism by which complex life can evolve. It then examines the implications of natural selection for life on other planets. The book ends by examining the question of whether humanity is a parochial Earth-centric concept, or whether intelligent alien life should also be considered human.

The book draws on the work of paleontologist Simon Conway Morris on convergent evolution, and on Universal Darwinism, popularised by Richard Dawkins.

=== Contents ===
1. Introduction

Sets out the basis of the claims made in the book, that observing animal life of Earth can tell us about the nature of life on other planets.

2. Form vs Function: What is Common Across Worlds?

Why natural selection is both a universal and predictable process, the existence and results of which are likely to be present on alien planets.

3. What are Animals and What are Aliens?

Examines the definition of animals, from the historical definitions derived from observation (e.g. Aristotle), to modern phylogenetic relationships. The book argues that a purely phylogenetic definition of what is an animal cannot be sufficient for classifying alien life.

4. Movement – Scuttling and Gliding Across Space

How the constrains of physics and mechanics combined with evolutionary laws to produce the movement strategies we see on Earth, and why many of these strategies (e.g. legs) are likely to exist on other planets too.

5. Communication Channels

The different ways that animals communicate: sound, vision, smell, and what might lead these same channels to be used by alien life to communicate.

6. Intelligence (Whatever That Is)

How different forms of intelligence evolved on Earth, and how similar intelligences might evolve on other planets.

7. Sociality – Cooperation, Competition and Teatime

The processes driving the evolution of social behavior are well understood, and, the book claims, are almost inevitably going to be driving alien sociality as well.

8. Information – A Very Ancient Commodity

Truth and lies, information about the environment and about oneself, are all under evolutionary pressure, and principles of game theory are universal enough to tell us what information aliens are likely to use.

9. Language – The Unique Skill

Humans are the only species on Earth that have a true language, but the processes that led to language evolution may be occurring on other worlds as well.

10. Artificial Intelligence – A Universe Full of Bots?

Some scientists (e.g. astronomer Seth Shostak) have proposed that alien life is more likely to be technological rather than biological. This chapter explores whether such artificial intelligence would also be subject to the laws of evolution.

11. Humanity, As We Know It

Drawing on the principles of the previous chapter, Kershenbaum emphasises that underlying similarities between life on Earth and that on other planets implies that the title of human should be more broadly applied than just being restricted to Homo sapiens.

12. Epilogue

== Awards ==
- BBC Science Focus magazine's 15 of the best space and astronomy books 2020
- The Times Best science books of the year 2020

== Reception ==
The Zoologist's Guide to the Galaxy was featured as one of the New York Times Editors' Choice of books.

Professor Lewis Dartnell, writing in The Times, summarised, "Pondering scientifically on the concept of the extraterrestrial, of universalities and alternatives, is to hold a full-length mirror up to ourselves. This allows us to deconstruct everything from our physiology to psychology, and so explore why humans are the way we are. To comprehend the alien is to know thyself."

In The Sunday Times, titled Using Darwinism to imagine what extraterrestrials may really be like James McConnachie wrote, "Arik Kershenbaum is a Cambridge zoologist who wants to prepare us for first contact. When we finally discover aliens, what might they be like?... Where much writing on astrobiology is joyously speculative, Kershenbaum is doggedly cautious, building his case from first evolutionary principles."

Primatologist Frans de Waal wrote, "If you don't want to be surprised by extraterrestrial life, look no further than this lively overview of the laws of evolution that have produced life on earth. Assuming these laws to be universal, Arik Kershenbaum predicts what alien organisms might look like."
