= Finding Darwin's God =

Book by Kenneth Miller

- Finding Darwin's God first edition cover
- Author: Kenneth R. Miller
- Original title: Finding Darwin's God: A Scientist's Search for Common Ground Between God and Evolution
- Language: English
- Subject: Creationism, evolution and the creation–evolution controversy
- Genre: Non-fiction
- Publisher: Cliff Street Books
- Publication date: 1999
- Publication place: United States
- English publication date: 1999
- Media type: Print (hardcover)
- Pages: 338
- ISBN: 0-06-017593-1

Finding Darwin's God: A Scientist's Search for Common Ground Between God and Evolution is a 2000 book by the American cell biologist and Roman Catholic Kenneth R. Miller wherein he argues that evolution does not contradict religious faith. Miller argues that evolution occurred, that Earth is not young, that science must work based on methodological naturalism, and that evolution cannot be construed as an effective argument for atheism. He examines various views of God and evolution, before describing his own.

== Content ==
Darwin’s Apple discusses Miller’s first encounter with Darwin’s' On the Origin of Species. He summarizes the main points: “Breeders did draw upon the range of variation in domestic animals and plants to make new varieties. A similar range of variation did exist in nature. The conditions of life did place each individual in competition with others. And this competition clearly affected the range of variation that survived.” He quotes Thomas Huxley on first reading Origin: “How foolish of me not to have thought of it!”

He asks: “Does evolution nullify all world views that depend upon the spiritual? Does it demand logical agnosticism as the price of scientific consistency? And does it rigorously exclude belief in God? These are questions I will explore in the pages that follow. My answer, in each and every case, is a resounding no. I do not say this, as you will see, because evolution is wrong. Far from it. The reason, as I hope to show, is because evolution is right."

Eden’s Children looks at the nature of scientific evidence. He explains how spectroscopy allowed Gustav Kirchhoff to determine the chemical composition of the Sun and stars (and allowed J. Norman Lockyer to discover helium on the Sun before William Ramsay detected it on Earth.) Similarly, science allows us to determine trends in Earth’s history. Geologists starting with William Smith noticed patters in the geologic distribution of species. Étienne Geoffroy Saint-Hilaire and Georges Cuvier proposed that life had changed over time but couldn’t explain how. Darwin provided a mechanism: natural selection.

He describes speciation in the fossil record, among Rhizoslenia and of our own species branching from Australopithecus. He looks at evolution as a creative force, noting that “Mutations are a continuing and inexhaustible source of variation, and they provide the raw material that is shaped by natural selection. Since mutations can duplicate, delete, invert, and rewrite any part of the genetic system in any organism, they can produce any change that evolution has documented.” Tragic examples include the evolution of Staphylococcus and Streptococcus to resist penicillin, and of HIV to resist protease inhibitors. Evolution can be constructive, as evidenced by Willem P. C. Stemmer’s work on DNA shuffling. He writes that “Evolution is both a fact and a theory. It is a fact that evolutionary change took place. And evolution is also a theory that seeks to explain the detailed mechanism behind that change.”

God the Charlatan examines Young Earth Creationism, and explains how multiple independent lines of evidence (uranium-lead dating, potassium-argon dating, rubidium-strontium dating) establish the true age of the earth. Some YECs argue that God deliberately gave these rocks the “appearance” of antiquity. Miller argues that “In order to defend God against the challenges they see from evolution, they have had to make Him into a schemer, a trickster, even a charlatan”, which Miller finds unnecessary and offensive.

God the Magician examines Intelligent Design, whose advocates claim natural selection cannot produce the change seen in the fossil record. He cites David Reznick’s experiments with guppies. Reznick and his team “measured rates of change for various characteristics from 3,700 to 45,000 darwins.” This is faster than the change depicted in the fossil record: “The changes in tooth size among horses during the Tertiary, a period of rapid (in evolutionary terms) evolution well recorded in the fossil record, is around 0.04 darwins." The authors note the evolution they observed is “similar in magnitude to rates that have been obtained by artificial selection and four to seven orders of magnitude greater than those observed in the fossil record.”

God the Mechanic examines the argument of irreducible complexity. He cites work from Barry Hall on the evolution of galactosidase in bacteria. He explains how gene duplication is involved in the evolution of complex systems, citing work by John M. Logsdon and Ford Doolittle. ID advocate Michael Behe claimed blood-clotting was too complex to have evolved, despite work by Russell Doolittle showing how it could have.

The Gods of Disbelief examines those who have used evolution to advocate atheism, which Miller argues is unnecessary and counterproductive. While finding much to admire in the writings of Richard Dawkins, E. O. Wilson and Stephen Jay Gould, Miller argues that evolution does not necessitate a hard materialist worldview.

Beyond Materialism explores quantum indeterminacy, and argues that it shows hard determinism to be wanting.

The Road Back Home explores cosmology. Edwin Hubble’s discovery that the universe is expanding indicates that it was smaller in the past, and was once concentrated at a single point. This theory is corroborated by the cosmic microwave background. If the Universe had a beginning, perhaps it had a creator. He quotes Robert Jastrow: “At this moment it seems as though science will never be able to raise the curtain on the mystery of creation. For the scientist who has lived by his faith in the power of reason, the story ends like a bad dream. He has scaled the mountains of ignorance; he is about to conquer the highest peak; as he pulls himself over the final rock, he is greeted by a band of theologians who have been sitting there for centuries.” He explores the fine-tuned universe and the anthropic principle.

Finding Darwin's God considers the unlikely series of events that led to human evolution: “The special nature of the particular history that led to us can make us understand how truly remarkable we are, how rare is the gift of consciousness, how precious is the chance to understand, and to the believer, how great are the gifts and expectations of God’s love.” Miller says his students ask him what kind of God he believes in. He says he points them to the last lines of On the Origin of Species: “There is grandeur in this view of life; with its several powers having been originally breathed by the Creator into a few forms or into one; and that, whilst this planet has gone cycling on according to the fixed law of gravity, endless forms most beautiful and most wonderful have been, and are being evolved.”

== Reception ==
Kirkus Reviews called it a “well-reasoned, intelligent text describing why followers of mainstream religions can also embrace the theory of evolution.”

Per Publishers Weekly, Miller “displays an impressive fairness, which he communicates in friendly, conversational prose. This is a book that will stir readers of both science and theology, perhaps satisfying neither, but challenging both to open their minds.”

Liz Marlantes writes “Miller's scientific arguments are compelling, presented in terms that any layman could understand. He's never condescending or dull.”

== Reviews ==
- Review of Finding Darwin's God by Henry E. Neufeld (theistic evolutionist)
- Review of Kenneth Miller's "Finding Darwin's God" by Michael Ruse for Metanexus Institute (agnostic)
- Yin and Yang of Kenneth Miller: How Professor Miller finds Darwin's God by Amiel Rossow (skeptic)
- Review of Kenneth Miller's Finding Darwin's God by Edward B. Davis (Christian historian of science), based on a version published by Reports of the National Center for Science Education 22.1-2 (Jan-Apr 2002): 47–8.
