= Kenneth R. Miller =

American biologist and professor (born 1948)

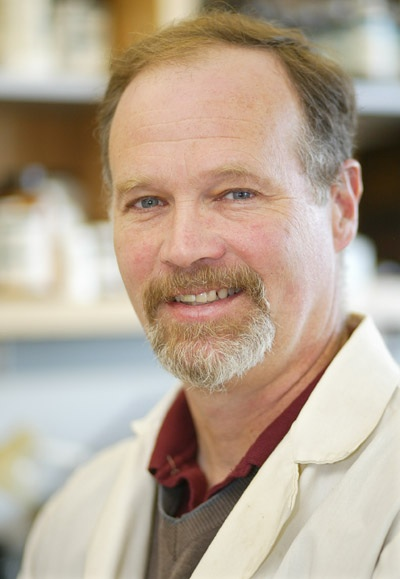
- Miller in 2006
- Born: July 14, 1948 (age 78)
- Education: Brown University; University of Colorado Boulder
- Known for: Catholic criticism of creationism
- Awards: ASCB Public Service Award (2006); AAAS Public Engagement with Science Award (2008); Stephen Jay Gould Prize from the Society for the Study of Evolution (2011); Laetare Medal (2014); St. Albert Award (2017)
- Scientific career
- Fields: Cell biology Biochemistry
- Workplaces: Brown University
- Thesis: The structure of the photosynthetic membrane (1974)
- Notable students: Craig Mello

Kenneth Raymond Miller (born July 14, 1948) is an American cell biologist and molecular biologist. He is a professor emeritus of biology at Brown University. Miller's primary research focus is the structure and function of cell membranes, especially chloroplast thylakoid membranes. Miller is a co-author of a major introductory college and high school biology textbook published by Prentice Hall since 1990.

Miller, who is a devout practising Catholic, is opposed to creationism, including the intelligent design (ID) movement. He has written three books on the subject: Finding Darwin's God, Only a Theory, and The Human Instinct. Miller has received the Laetare Medal at the University of Notre Dame. In 2017, he received the inaugural St. Albert Award from the Society of Catholic Scientists.

== Biography ==
Kenneth Raymond Miller was born on July 14, 1948. Miller graduated from Rahway High School in Rahway, New Jersey, and then received his Bachelor of Science in biology in 1970 from Brown University. He earned his Ph.D. in biology from the University of Colorado Boulder in 1974. From 1974 to 1980, he taught at Harvard University.

== Research ==
His research involves problems of structure and function in biological membranes, especially chloroplast thylakoid membranes, often involving electron microscopy.

== Science advocacy ==
Miller has voiced his support for "pro-science" candidates in politics. He has campaigned for school board and education candidates who support the teaching of evolution in Kansas and Ohio. In the science community, he has sought to elevate the understanding of scientists of the roots of the creationist movement, and to encourage the popularization of scientific concepts. Miller is critical of atheism for being an unscientific position. He was a spokesman for PBS's Evolution documentary.

Miller has appeared in court as a witness, and on panels debating the teaching of intelligent design in schools. In 2002, the Ohio State Board of Education held a public debate between two scientists, including Miller, and two proponents of intelligent design.

He testified for the plaintiffs, but only as a fact witness (not as an expert), in Selman v. Cobb County, testing the legality of stickers calling evolution a "theory, not a fact" that were placed on the biology textbook Miller authored. In 2005, the judge ruled that the stickers violated the Establishment Clause of the First Amendment to the United States Constitution. This decision was vacated on appeal because of missing records of the previous trial. The case was remanded for additional evidentiary inquiry and new findings, and a list of factual issues that the court would probably want to address included as item 15 a reference to Miller's testimony regarding "the colloquial or popular understanding of the term [theory]" and the suggested question as to whether he has any qualifications to testify as an expert on the popular meaning of the word "theory". The case was remanded back to the lower court and was eventually settled out of court.

Miller was also the plaintiff's lead expert witness in the 2004-2005 Kitzmiller v. Dover Area School District case, challenging the school board's mandate to incorporate intelligent design into the curriculum. The judge in that case also ruled decisively in favor of the plaintiffs. In 2006, he gave a lecture at Case Western Reserve University on "The Collapse of Intelligent Design".

He spoke at the Skeptics Society's Origins Conference in October 2008, and at the Veritas Forum on topics such as the relationship between science and religion and the existence of God.

Miller has appeared on the Comedy Central television show The Colbert Report, and has made many appearances on C-SPAN debating proponents of creationism and intelligent design. He has debated several supporters of intelligent design including biochemist Michael J. Behe.

He gave a Faraday Institute lecture in April 2009 on "God, Darwin and Design" and appeared on the Today Programme arguing, "The issue of God is an issue on which reasonable people may differ, but I certainly think that it's an over-statement of our scientific knowledge and understanding to argue that science in general, or evolutionary biology in particular, proves in any way that there is no God."

== Publications ==
=== General books ===
- Finding Darwin's God: A Scientist's Search for Common Ground Between God and Evolution (2000, Cliff Street Books ISBN 0-06-093049-7) which argues that acceptance of evolution is compatible with a belief in God.
- Only a Theory: Evolution and the Battle for America's Soul, (2008, Penguin Group, ISBN 978-0-670-01883-3 ) which explores Intelligent Design and the Kitzmiller v. Dover Area School District case along with its implications on teaching science in America
- The Human Instinct: How We Evolved to Have Reason, Consciousness, and Free Will (Simon and Schuster. 2018 ISBN 978-1476790268) which explores how humans evolved to develop reason, consciousness, and free will. it was described by David DiSalvo as "an optimist's argument for a refreshed view of human evolution"

=== Textbooks ===
Miller is the co-author (with Boston College neurobiologist and marine biologist Joseph Levine) of a major introductory college and high school biology textbook published by Prentice Hall since 1990. The current edition was published in 2010 by Savvas (which now owns Prentice Hall). Initially, Prentice Hall approached Joseph Levine to write the textbook after reading an article he wrote in Smithsonian magazine; Levine, who is a former student of Miller's, then recruited Miller as a co-author. Miller and Levine have also co-written a college-level textbook published by the former D.C. Heath and Company, first edition in 1991, entitled Biology: Discovering Life.

- Miller, K.R. and Levine, J. (2002) Biology: The Living Science (various editions of high school textbook)

== Honors ==
2006 Public Service Award from the American Society for Cell Biology.

2006 Dwight H. Terry Lectureship at Yale University, delivering his lecture "Darwin, God, and Dover: What the Collapse of 'Intelligent Design' Means for Science and for Faith in America."

2008 American Association for the Advancement of Science (AAAS) Award for Public Understanding of Science and Technology.

2010 Elected as a Fellow of the Committee for Skeptical Inquiry.

May 2014, Laetare Medal at the University of Notre Dame.

2017, inaugural St. Albert Award from the Society of Catholic Scientists.

Since 2016, Miller has been listed on the board of directors of the National Center for Science Education. In 2017 he became the president.

== See also ==
- Creation and evolution in public education
