= Brenham Christian Academy =

Location
- 2111 S. Blue Bell Road; Brenham, Texas; United States; 30.1557°N 96.3663°W

Information
- Type: Private
- Religious affiliation: Christian
- Denomination: Non-denominational
- Established: 1993
- School board: Board of Directors
- Principal: Sheila Suders
- Faculty: 12FTE 9 part time basis
- Grades: K to 12
- Enrollment: 111 (2014)
- Student to teacher ratio: 9.6
- Colors: Red, Blue and White
- Athletics conference: TAPPS
- Sports: Football, Basketball, Track, Tennis, Golf, Volleyball, Swimming, and Cheer-leading
- Mascot: Eagles
- Team name: The Eagles
- Accreditation: ACSI
- Website: www.brenhamchristianacademy.org

Brenham Christian Academy was a private Christian school located in Brenham, Texas and was established in 1993 with its first graduating class of 1997. After a steady decline in the 2000s, the school closed and reopened as Citadel Christian School in 2018.
