= Neo-creationism =

Pseudoscientific creationist movement

Neo-creationism is a pseudoscientific movement which aims to restate creationism in terms more likely to be well received by the public, by policy makers, by educators and by the scientific community. It aims to re-frame the debate over the origins of life in non-religious terms and without appeals to scripture. In the United States, this comes in response to the 1987 ruling by the Supreme Court in Edwards v. Aguillard that creationism is an inherently religious concept and that advocating it as correct or accurate in public-school curricula violates the Establishment Clause of the First Amendment.

One of the principal claims of neo-creationism propounds that ostensibly objective orthodox science, with a foundation in naturalism, is actually a dogmatically atheistic religion. Its proponents argue that the scientific method excludes certain explanations of phenomena, particularly where they point towards supernatural elements, thus effectively excluding religious insight from contributing to understanding the universe. This leads to an open and often hostile opposition to what neo-creationists term "Darwinism", which they generally mean to refer to evolution, but which they may extend to include such concepts as abiogenesis, stellar evolution and the Big Bang theory.

Notable neo-creationist organizations include the Discovery Institute and its Center for Science and Culture. Neo-creationists have yet to establish a recognized line of legitimate scientific research and as of 2015 lack scientific and academic legitimacy, even among many academics of evangelical Christian colleges. Eugenie C. Scott and other critics regard neo-creationism as the most successful form of irrationalism. The main form of neo-creationism is intelligent design. A second form, abrupt appearance theory, which claims that the first life and the universe appeared abruptly and that plants and animals appeared abruptly in complex form, has occasionally been postulated.

== Motivations ==
The neo-creationist movement is motivated by the fear that religion is under attack by the study of evolution. An argument common to neo-creationist justifications is that society has suffered "devastating cultural consequences" from adopting materialism and that science is the cause of this decay into materialism since science seeks only natural explanations. They believe that the theory of evolution implies that humans have no spiritual nature, no moral purpose, and no intrinsic meaning, and thus that acceptance of evolution devalues human life directly leading to the atrocities committed by Hitler's Nazi regime, for example. The movement's proponents seek to "defeat [the] materialist world view" represented by the theory of evolution in favor of "a science consonant with Christian and theistic convictions". Phillip E. Johnson, 'father' of the intelligent design movement, states the movement's goal is to "affirm the reality of God".

== Tactics ==
Much of the effort of neo-creationists in response to science consists of polemics highlighting gaps in understanding or minor inconsistencies in the literature of biology, then making statements about what can and cannot happen in biological systems. Critics of neo-creationism suggest that neo-creationist science consists of quote-mining the biological literature (including outdated literature) for minor slips, inconsistencies or polemically promising examples of internal arguments. These internal disagreements, fundamental to the working of all natural science, are then presented dramatically to lay audiences as evidence of the fraudulence and impending collapse of "Darwinism". Critics suggest that neo-creationists routinely employ this method to exploit the technical issues within biology and evolutionary theory to their advantage, relying on a public that is not sufficiently scientifically literate to follow the complex and sometimes difficult details.

Robert T. Pennock argues that intelligent design proponents are "manufacturing dissent" in order to explain the absence of scientific debate of their claims: "The 'scientific' claims of such neo-creationists as Johnson, Denton, and Behe rely, in part, on the notion that these issues [surrounding evolution] are the subject of suppressed debate among biologists.... According to neo-creationists, the apparent absence of this discussion and the nearly universal rejection of neo-creationist claims must be due to the conspiracy among professional biologists instead of a lack of scientific merit."

Eugenie Scott describes neo-creationism as "a mixed bag of antievolution strategies brought about by legal decisions against equal time laws". Those legal decisions, McLean v. Arkansas and Edwards v. Aguillard, doomed the teaching of creation science as an alternative to evolution in public school science classes. Scott considers intelligent design, and the various strategies of design proponents like Teach the Controversy and Critical Analysis of Evolution, as leading examples of neo-creationism.

Neo-creationists generally reject the term "neo-creation", alleging it is a pejorative term. Any linkage of their views to creationism would undermine their goal of being viewed as advocating a new form of science. Instead, they identify themselves to their non-scientific audience as conducting valid science, sometimes by redefining science to suit their needs. This is rejected by the vast majority of actual science practitioners. Nevertheless, neo-creationists profess to present and conduct valid science which is equal, or superior to, the theory of evolution, but have yet to produce recognized scientific research and testing that supports their claims. Instead, the preponderance of neo-creationist works are publications aimed at the general public and lawmakers and policymakers. Much of that published work is polemical in nature, disputing and controverting what they see as a "scientific orthodoxy" which shields and protects "Darwinism" while attacking and ridiculing alleged alternatives like intelligent design. Examples of neo-creationist polemics include the Discovery Institute's Wedge Document, the book Darwin on Trial by Phillip E. Johnson, and the book From Darwin to Hitler by Richard Weikart. Research for Weikart's book was funded by the Discovery Institute, and is promoted through the institute. Both Johnson and Weikart are affiliated with the Discovery Institute; Johnson is program advisor, and Weikart is a fellow.

== Criticism ==
All of the following names make explicit the connections between traditional creationism, neo-creationism and intelligent design. Not all critics of neo-creationism are on the evolution side of the debate. Henry M. Morris, a notable young earth creationist, accepted the term but opposed the logic of neo-creationism for the very reason that it does not embrace the Bible. The Baptist Center for Ethics calls for "Baptists to recommit themselves to the separation of church and state, which will keep public schools free from coercive pressure to promote sectarian faith, such as state-written school prayers and the teaching of neo-creationism..."

- Barbara Forrest, co-author of Creationism's Trojan Horse: The Wedge of Intelligent Design (ISBN 0-19-515742-7)
- Georgetown University theologian John Haught
- Journalist Chris Mooney, author of The Republican War on Science (ISBN 0-465-04675-4)
- Massimo Pigliucci
- Eugenie C. Scott
- Robert T. Pennock

== See also ==
- Creation–evolution controversy
- Creation myth
- Creation science
- Christian fundamentalism and conspiracy theories
- Intelligent design movement
- Social effects of evolutionary theory
- Theistic realism
