= Intelligent designer =

In neo-creationism, the creator of life

An intelligent designer, also referred to as an intelligent agent, is the pseudoscientific hypothetical willed and self-aware entity that the intelligent design movement argues had some role in the origin and/or development of life. The term "intelligent cause" is also used, implying their teleological supposition of direction and purpose in features of the universe and of living things.

== History ==
The popularly termed intelligent design movement is a neo-creationist campaign that arose out of the Christian fundamentalist creation science movement. Proponents of intelligent design argue to the public that their concept does not posit the identity of the designer as part of this effort, but in statements to their constituency, which consists largely of Christian conservatives, they identify the designer as God. The Discovery Institute has claimed that university criticism of intelligent design is tantamount to "endorsement of an anti-religious view".

== Identity ==
William Dembski states in his book Design Inference that the nature of the intelligent designer cannot be inferred from intelligent design and suggests that the designer, if one is even necessary for design inference, may or may not be "the God of Scripture." In December 2007 Dembski told Focus on the Family, "I believe God created the world for a purpose. The Designer of intelligent design is, ultimately, the Christian God."

Some leading intelligent design proponents have stated identifying or characterizing the designer is beyond the scope of intelligent design as a line of inquiry. Proponents had hoped that, by avoiding invoking creation by a specific supernatural entity, (such as that employed by creation science), intelligent design would be considered scientific and not violate the Establishment Clause of the US constitution. Proponents feared that were intelligent design identified as a restatement of previous forms of creationism, it would be precluded from being taught in public schools after the 1987 Supreme Court of the United States decision in Edwards vs Aguillard. This line of reasoning was not particularly persuasive to most in the scientific community, which overwhelmingly rejected intelligent design as both a line of scientific inquiry and as a basis for a sound education in science.

On December 20, 2005 federal district court ruled in Kitzmiller v. Dover Area School District that intelligent design was not science and was essentially religious in nature. The ruling not only rendered that public school district's endorsement of intelligent design as an alternative to evolution in science classes unconstitutional on the grounds that its inclusion violates the Establishment Clause of the First Amendment, but validated the objections of critics who discounted proponents' claim that the identity was not God.

Highlighting these mutually exclusive claims about the designer, Dembski, despite having said that the intelligent designer or designers could be any god or gods, or even space aliens, has also said that "intelligent design should be understood as the evidence that God has placed in nature to show that the physical world is the product of intelligence and not simply the result of mindless material forces" and that "Intelligent design is just the Logos theology of John's Gospel restated in the idiom of information theory."

At various times, leading proponents in the intelligent design movement have clearly expressed that they consider the Abrahamic God "Elohim" in his role as a creator God, to be the intelligent designer and denied that intelligent designer is God, depending on which audience they are addressing. One example is William Dembski, who on his blog in response to the question "Is the designer responsible for biological complexity God?" said "not necessarily" and "To ask who or what is the designer of a particular object is to ask for the immediate intelligent agent responsible for its design. The point is that God is able to work through derived or surrogate intelligences, which can be anything from angels to organizing principles embedded in nature." Yet to the intelligent design movement's conservative Christian constituents Dembski has said "intelligent design should be understood as the evidence that God has placed in nature to show that the physical world is the product of intelligence and not simply the result of mindless material forces. This evidence is available to all apart from the special revelation of God in salvation history as recounted in Scripture. ... Intelligent design makes it impossible to be an intellectually fulfilled atheist. This gives intelligent design incredible traction as a tool for apologetics, opening up the God-question to individuals who think that science has buried God" and "Thus, in its relation to Christianity, intelligent design should be viewed as a ground-clearing operation that gets rid of the intellectual rubbish that for generations has kept Christianity from receiving serious consideration." Stephen C. Meyer, founder and leader of the intelligent design program of the Discovery Institute admitted on national television he believes that the designer is God.

Phillip E. Johnson, considered the father of the ID movement has stated the goal of the intelligent design movement:

"Our strategy has been to change the subject a bit so that we can get the issue of intelligent design, which really means the reality of God, before the academic world and into the schools." -- Phillip E. Johnson, American Family Radio, January 10, 2003

"This isn't really, and never has been a debate about science. It's about religion and philosophy." -- Phillip E. Johnson, World Magazine, November 30, 1996

The Discovery Institute's leaked Wedge document sets out the movement's governing goals, including:

"To replace materialistic explanations with the theistic understanding that nature and human beings are created by God." . . . "Design theory promises to reverse the stifling dominance of the materialist worldview, and to replace it with a science consonant with Christian and theistic convictions." -- The Wedge Document, a 1999 Discovery Institute pamphlet

== Claimed actions ==
Opinion as to the amount of creation the intelligent designer has done varies within the ID movement. Michael Behe's concept of irreducible complexity has natural selection accounting for most of evolution but the intelligent designer contributing the design of some proteins. Others in the ID movement however contest concepts such as common descent, particularly of humans and other apes. Though most in the ID movement seem to be Old Earth Creationists, a few are Young Earth Creationists.

The amount of creation that the intelligent designer did has also been criticised by Young Earth Creationists as not being specific enough, and particularly contradicting their beliefs of Biblical inerrancy and a young earth. Some intelligent design proponents say the intelligent designer fine-tuned the universe's physical constants in such a way that life is the result of the universe's physical constants being related to one another in a fashion that permits life to exist. The fine-tuned universe argument is a central premise or presented as a given in many of the published works of prominent intelligent design proponents, such as William A. Dembski and Michael Behe.

== Criticism ==
Intelligent design has been presented by its proponents as a "big tent" strategy into which several accounts of creation can fit. Were a "scientific" version of intelligent design approved for inclusion in public school science curricula, then a path would be opened for discussion of alternatives to not only natural selection but naturalism as well, and eventually religious accounts on the origin of life. The vast majority of scientists reject the concept of intelligent design and an intelligent designer. Instead, the most widely accepted explanation is that physical processes such as natural selection can account for the complexity of life and other phenomena and features of the universe. Attempts to insert theories of intelligent design into public school science curricula fits in with the intelligent design movement's social aims, via the overturning of Western secularism as detailed in the Wedge strategy. The concept of the intelligent designer has been criticised as a God-of-the-gaps argument. Introducing the hypothesis of an intelligent designer introduces the unsolved problem of accounting for the origin of such a designer (first cause).

By raising the question of the need for a designer for objects with irreducible complexity, intelligent design also raises the question, "what designed the designer?" Richard Dawkins has argued that "If complex organisms demand an explanation, so does a complex designer. And it's no solution to raise the theologian's plea that God (or the intelligent designer) is simply immune to the normal demands of scientific explanation," since such an answer would be unscientific. With religious creationism, the question "what created God?" can be answered with theological arguments, but in intelligent design, the chain of designers can be followed back indefinitely in an infinite regression, leaving the question of the creation of the first designer dangling. As a result, intelligent design does not explain how the complexity happened in the first place; it just moves it.

Elliott Sober says that by intelligent design's own arguments, a designer capable of creating irreducible complexity must also be irreducibly complex: "Any mind in nature that designs and builds an irreducibly complex system is itself irreducibly complex" Sober says that this an argument that intelligent design proponents still need to respond to.

If intelligent design proponents invoke an uncaused causer or deity to resolve this problem, they contradict a fundamental assumption of intelligent design that design requires a designer and reduce intelligent design to religious creationism. Another possible counter-argument might be an infinite regression of designers. However, admitting infinite numbers of objects also allows any arbitrarily improbable event to occur, such as an object with "specific" complexity assembling itself by chance. Again, this contradicts a fundamental assumption of intelligent design that a designer is needed for every specifically complex object, producing a logical contradiction.

Critics contend the claim that positing a designer which explains gaps in our understanding yet does not need to be itself explained as not a contribution to knowledge but as a thought-terminating cliché.

== The Dover trial ==
In 2005, intelligent design proponents arguments regarding the identity of a designer became an issue considered by the court in Kitzmiller v. Dover Area School District, the "Dover trial," where plaintiffs successfully argued that intelligent design is a form of creationism, and that the school board policy requiring the presentation of intelligent design as an alternative to evolution as an "explanation of the origin of life" thus violated the Establishment Clause of the First Amendment to the United States Constitution. In his ruling, the judge, John E. Jones III, stated

"However, as Dr. Haught testified, anyone familiar with Western religious thought would immediately make the association that the tactically unnamed designer is God..." -- Ruling, Kitzmiller v. Dover Area School District, page 25

Jones also commented that the appearance of design is subjective:

"It is readily apparent to the Court that the only attribute of design that biological systems appear to share with human artifacts is their complex appearance, i.e. if it looks complex or designed, it must have been designed. (23:73 (Behe)). This inference to design based upon the appearance of a "purposeful arrangement of parts" is a completely subjective proposition, determined in the eye of each beholder and his/her viewpoint concerning the complexity of a system." -- Ruling, Kitzmiller v. Dover Area School District, page 81

"For human artifacts, we know the designer's identity, human, and the mechanism of design, as we have experience based upon empirical evidence that humans can make such things, as well as many other attributes including the designer's abilities, needs, and desires. With ID, proponents assert that they refuse to propose hypotheses on the designer's identity, do not propose a mechanism, and the designer, he/she/it/they, has never been seen. In that vein, defense expert Professor Minnich agreed that in the case of human artifacts and objects, we know the identity and capacities of the human designer, but we do not know any of those attributes for the designer of biological life. In addition, Professor Behe agreed that for the design of human artifacts, we know the designer and its attributes and we have a baseline for human design that does not exist for design of biological systems. Professor Behe's only response to these seemingly insurmountable points of disanalogy was that the inference still works in science fiction movies. -- Ruling, Kitzmiller v. Dover Area School District, page 81

The judge ruled that "ID cannot uncouple itself from its creationist, and thus religious, antecedents" and "that ID is an interesting theological argument, but that it is not science."

== See also ==
- Anthropic principle
- Conflict thesis
- Continuity thesis
- Flying Spaghetti Monster
- Genesis creation narrative
- Great Architect of the Universe
