= Center for Science and Culture =

Part of the Discovery Institute

- Founded: 1996
- Type: Non-profit
- Purpose: Promote intelligent design
- Location: Seattle, Washington, United States
- Owner: Discovery Institute
- Key people: Stephen C. Meyer
- Employees: 8 staff
- Website: www.discovery.org/id/

The Center for Science and Culture (CSC), formerly known as the Center for the Renewal of Science and Culture (CRSC), is a research center at the Discovery Institute (DI), an American conservative evangelical think tank. The CSC lobbies for the inclusion of creationism in the form of intelligent design (ID) in public school science curricula as an explanation for the origins of life and the universe while trying to cast doubt on the scientific theory of evolution. Intelligent design is a pseudoscientific form of neo-creationism overwhelmingly rejected by the scientific community, whereas the theory of evolution is the accepted scientific consensus.

The Center for Science and Culture serves as the hub of the intelligent design movement. Nearly all of prominent proponents of intelligent design are either CSC advisors, officers, or fellows. Stephen C. Meyer, a former vice president of the Discovery Institute and founder of the CSC, serves as a Senior Fellow, and Phillip E. Johnson was the Program Advisor. Johnson is commonly presented as the movement's "father" and architect of the center's Wedge strategy and "Teach the Controversy" campaign, as well as the Santorum Amendment.

== History ==
In 1987, the US Supreme Court ruled in Edwards v. Aguillard against creation science being taught in United States public school science classes. In reaction, the term intelligent design was coined as a substitute in drafts of the textbook Of Pandas and People, which was published in 1989, beginning the campaigning of the intelligent design movement under the leadership of Pandas editor Charles Thaxton. The Edwards v. Aguillard ruling also inspired Phillip E. Johnson to begin anti-evolution campaigning. He met Stephen C. Meyer, and through him was introduced to others who were developing what became the Wedge strategy, including Michael Denton, Michael Behe and William A. Dembski, with Johnson becoming the de facto leader of the group. By 1995, Johnson was opposing the methodological naturalism of science in which "The Creator belongs to the realm of religion, not scientific investigation", and promoting "theistic realism" which "assumes that the universe and all its creatures were brought into existence for a purpose by God" and expects "this 'fact' of creation to have empirical, observable consequences."

In December 1993, Bruce Chapman, president and founder of the Discovery Institute, noticed an essay in The Wall Street Journal by Meyer about a dispute when biology lecturer Dean H. Kenyon taught intelligent design creationism in introductory classes. Kenyon had co-authored Of Pandas and People, and in 1993 Meyer had contributed to the teacher's notes for the second edition of Pandas. Meyer was an old friend of Discovery Institute co-founder George Gilder, and over dinner about a year later they formed the idea of a think tank opposed to materialism. In mid-1995, Chapman and Meyer met a representative of Howard Ahmanson, Jr. Meyer, who had previously tutored Ahmanson's son in science, recalls being asked "What could you do if you had some financial backing?"

The Center for the Renewal of Science and Culture, as it was originally named, grew out of a conference called "The Death of Materialism and the Renewal of Culture" that the Discovery Institute organised in mid-1995. It was founded in 1996 by the Discovery Institute with funding provided by Fieldstead & Company, the Stewardship Foundation, Howard Ahmanson, Jr. and the Maclellan Foundation. The evolution of the center's name in 2002 reflects its attempt to present itself as less religiously motivated in the public's eye. The evolving banners on the CRSC/CSC's website pictorially parallel these verbal efforts to disassociate the site from its overtly religious origins. The "renewal" in its name referred to its stated goal of "renewing" American culture by grounding society's major institutions, especially education, in religion as outlined in the Wedge Document.

== Organization ==
=== Officers, directors, and fellows ===
Program Director

- Stephen C. Meyer

Associate Director

- John G. West

Program Advisor

- Phillip E. Johnson

Senior Fellows

- Michael J. Behe
- David Berlinski
- Paul Chien
- William A. Dembski
- Michael Denton
- David DeWolf
- Guillermo Gonzalez
- Bruce L. Gordon
- Michael Newton Keas
- David Klinghoffer
- Jay W. Richards
- Richard Sternberg
- Richard Weikart
- David Wells
- Jonathan Wells
- John G. West
- Benjamin Wiker
- Jonathan Witt

Fellows

- John Bloom
- Raymond Bohlin
- Walter Bradley
- J. Budziszewski
- Robert Lowry Clinton
- Jack Collins
- William Lane Craig
- Michael Flannery
- Brian Frederick
- Mark Hartwig
- Cornelius G. Hunter
- Robert Kaita
- Dean H. Kenyon
- Forrest M. Mims
- Scott Minnich
- J. P. Moreland
- Paul Nelson
- Nancy Pearcey
- Pattle Pak-Toe Pun
- John Mark Reynolds
- Henry F. Schaefer, III
- Geoffrey Simmons
- Wolfgang Smith
- Charles Thaxton

Former Fellows

- Francis J. Beckwith
- John Angus Campbell
- Robin Collins
- Jack Harris
- Robert C. Koons
- Jed Macosko
- Janet Moneymaker
- Jonathan Moneymaker
- Joseph Poulshock
- Anthony Rizzi
- Marcus R. Ross
- Mark Ryland
- Siegfried Scherer
- Jeffrey Schloss
- Wesley J. Smith

== Staff ==
- Robert L. Crowther, II, Director of Communications.

=== Casey Luskin ===
- Casey Luskin, "Research Coordinator" of the CSC and a South African geologist. Luskin has helped promote the Academic Freedom bills in Florida alongside Ben Stein. Luskin also writes for the Discovery Institute's blog, offering critiques of evolution, which have been met with criticism and rebuttal from the scientific community.

== CSC's Wedge strategy ==
An internal CSC report dating from 1998 which outlined a five-year plan for fostering broader acceptance of ID was leaked to the public in 1999. This plan became known as the Wedge strategy. The Wedge Document explained the CSC's key aims are "To defeat scientific materialism and its destructive moral, cultural and political legacies" and to "replace materialistic explanations with the theistic understanding that nature and human beings are created by God."

The document sets as "Five-Year Goals" "To see intelligent design theory as an accepted alternative in the sciences and scientific research being done from the perspective of design theory" and notably "To see major new debates in education, life issues, legal and personal responsibility pushed to the front of the national agenda." This was seen in the following years, with public debates over the teaching of intelligent design in public school classrooms taking place in many states as part of the Teach the Controversy campaign.

If the CSC's strategy is successful, within twenty years the goals are "To see intelligent design theory as the dominant perspective in science." and "To see design theory permeate our religious, cultural, moral and political life." The CSC has responded to controversy regarding the Wedge Document, saying "Conspiracy theorists in the media continue to recycle the urban legend of the 'Wedge' document..."

== CSC campaigns ==
=== Teach the Controversy ===
The CSC's Teach the Controversy campaign seeks to promote the teaching of "the full range of scientific views" on evolution on "unresolved issues" and the "scientific weaknesses of evolutionary theory." Critics of the CSC's campaign say that they have manufactured the controversy and that they promote the false perception that evolution is "in crisis" and is a "dying theory."

The strategy has been to move from standards battles, to curriculum writing, to textbook adoption, all the while undermining the central positions of evolution in biology and methodological naturalism in science. The CSC is the primary organizer and promoter of the Teach the Controversy campaign. Examples of Teach the Controversy in action were the Kansas evolution hearings, the Santorum Amendment, 2002 Ohio Board of Education intelligent design controversy, and the Dover Area School District intelligent design controversy.

The CSC believe that the program and curricula they advocate presents evidence both for and against evolution and then encourages students to evaluate the arguments themselves. Casting the conflicting points of view and agendas as an academic and scholarly controversy was proposed by Phillip E. Johnson of the Discovery Institute in his book The Wedge of Truth: Splitting the Foundations of Naturalism (2000). In his book, he writes of the 1999–2000 Kansas evolution hearings controversy over the teaching of intelligent design in public school classrooms: "What educators in Kansas and elsewhere should be doing is to 'teach the controversy.'"

In its early years, the CSC (then called the CRSC) offered science curriculum that assured teachers that its "Web curriculum can be appropriated without textbook adoption wars." This had the net effect of encouraging ID sympathetic teachers to side-step standard textbook adoption procedures. Anticipating a test case, Discovery Institute director Stephen C. Meyer along with David K. DeWolf and Mark Edward DeForrest published in the Utah Law Review a legal strategy for winning judicial sanction.

According to published reports, the nonprofit Discovery Institute spends more than $1 million USD a year for research, polls, lobbying and media pieces that support intelligent design and their Teach the Controversy strategy. In August 2005, The New York Times reported that since 2004 there have been 78 campaigns in 31 states to either Teach the Controversy or include intelligent design in science curricula, twice the number seen in 2002–2003.

=== Intelligent design in higher education ===
The cultivation of support for ID and its social and political agenda in higher education is a very active part of CSC's strategy. The CSC has claimed that established scholars in the scientific community support intelligent design.

CSC-recommended curricula benefits from special status at number of religious schools. Biola University and Oklahoma Baptist University are listed on the Access Research Network website as "ID Colleges." In addition, the Intelligent Design and Evolution Awareness Center (IDEA), which began as a student organization at the University of California, San Diego, helps establish student IDEA clubs on university and high school campuses. The Intelligent Design and Undergraduate Research Center, ARN's student division, also recruits and supports followers at universities. Campus youth ministries play an active role in bringing ID to university campuses through lectures by ID leaders Phillip E. Johnson, William A. Dembski, Jonathan Wells, Michael Behe, and others. This activity takes place outside university science departments.

Several public universities, including the University of California, Berkeley, and the University of New Mexico have had intelligent design often as freshman seminars, honors courses, and other courses outside required curricula in which instructors have wider latitude regarding course content.

=== Research fellowships ===
The CSC offers fellowships of up to $60,000 a year for "support of significant and original research in the natural sciences, the history and philosophy of science, cognitive science and related fields." Published reports state that the CSC has awarded $3.6 million in fellowships of $5,000 to $60,000 per year to 50 researchers since its founding in 1996.

Among the center's publications are 50 books on intelligent design, such as those by William A. Dembski, and two documentary films, Unlocking the Mystery of Life (2003) and The Privileged Planet (2004), the later based on the book of the same name written by senior fellows Jay W. Richards and Guillermo Gonzalez.

Since its founding in 1996, the CSC has spent 39 percent of its $9.3 million on research according to Meyer, underwriting books or papers, or often just paying universities to release professors from some teaching responsibilities so that they can ponder intelligent design. Over those nine years, $792,585 was spent to finance laboratory or field research in biology, paleontology, or biophysics, while $93,828 was spent to help graduate students in paleontology, linguistics, history, and philosophy.

The results of this are found in Discovery Institute-authored science class curricula, "model lesson plans", which are at the center of many of the current debates about including intelligent design in public school science classes. CSC promotes these, urging states and school boards to include criticism of evolution science lessons, and to "Teach the Controversy", rather than actually teach intelligent design which is susceptible to legal challenges on First Amendment grounds.

== Science & Culture Today ==
CSC launched a blog titled Evolution News & Views in 2004, renamed Evolution News & Science Today (often shortened to Evolution News) in 2017. The site was renamed again as Science and Culture Today in 2025.

== Controversies ==
In May 2005, the Discovery Institute donated $16,000 to the Smithsonian National Museum of Natural History, and by museum policy, this minimum donation allowed them to celebrate their donation inside the museum in a gathering. The Discovery Institute decided to screen The Privileged Planet. The video was also a production of Illustra Media, which has been identified as a front for a creationist production company. Upon further review, the Smithsonian National Museum of Natural History determined that the content of the video was inconsistent with the scientific research of the institution. As a result, they refunded the $16,000, clearly denied any endorsement of the content of the video or of the Discovery Institute, and allowed the film to be shown in the museum as per the original agreement. Editorials have decried as naïve and negligent the Smithsonian National Museum of Natural History's failure to identify the Discovery Institute as a creationist organization, exclude the video with its review process in the first place, and identify the entire incident as an example of Wedge strategy in action.

The center also funded research for the controversial book From Darwin to Hitler (2004) by Center fellow Richard Weikart. Weikart claims that Darwinism's impact on ethics and morality played a key role not only in the rise of eugenics, but also in euthanasia, infanticide, abortion, and racial extermination, all ultimately embraced by the Nazis.

On September 6, 2006, on the center's Evolution News & Views blog, Discovery Institute staffer Casey Luskin published a post titled "Putting Wikipedia On Notice About Their Biased Anti-ID Intelligent Design Entries". In the post, Luskin reprinted a letter from a reader complaining that English Wikipedia's coverage of ID to be "one sided" and that pro-intelligent design editors were censored and attacked. Along with the letter, Luskin published an English Wikipedia email address for general information and urged readers "to contact Wikipedia to express your feelings about the biased nature of the entries on intelligent design".

== Criticism ==
Though the CSC often claims that articles and books asserting intelligent design are published in the peer-reviewed scientific press, no pro-ID article has been published in a peer-reviewed scientific journal, with the exception of the one that had been quickly retracted by the publisher. That article, titled "The Origin of Biological Information and the Higher Taxonomic Categories", was by the institute's Stephen C. Meyer and was published in Proceedings of the Biological Society of Washington in 2004. One month after its publication, the journal's publisher issued a statement repudiating the article as not meeting its scientific standards and as having sidestepped peer review (see Sternberg peer review controversy).

Critics have accused the Center of intellectual dishonesty, in the form of misleading impressions created by the use of rhetoric, intentional ambiguity, and misrepresented evidence; and a lack of rigor are the most common criticisms of the center. Critics have also stated that its goal is to lead an unwary public to reach certain conclusions, and that many have been deceived as a result. Its critics, such as Eugenie Scott, Robert Pennock, and Barbara Forrest, claim that the CSC knowingly misquotes scientists and other experts, deceptively omits contextual text through ellipsis, and makes unsupported amplifications of relationships and credentials.

Barbara Forrest, author of Creationism's Trojan Horse, along with Glenn Branch, deputy director of the National Center for Science Education, write that the CSC uses academic credentials and affiliations opportunistically. In 2001 the Discovery Institute purchased advertisements in three national publications (The New York Review of Books, New Republic and Weekly Standard) to proclaim the adherence of approximately 100 scientists to the following statement: "We are skeptical of claims for the ability of random mutation and natural selection to account for the complexity of life. Careful examination of the evidence for Darwinian theory should be encouraged."

Such statements usually refer to the institutional affiliations of signatories for purposes of identification. But this statement strategically listed either the institution that granted a signatory's PhD or the institutions with which the individual is presently affiliated. Thus the institutions listed for Raymond G. Bohlin, Fazale Rana, and Jonathan Wells, for example, were the University of Texas, Ohio University, and the University of California, Berkeley, where they earned their degrees, rather than their current affiliations: Probe Ministries for Bohlin, the Reasons to Believe ministry for Rana, and the CSC for Wells. During controversies over evolution education in Georgia, New Mexico, Ohio, and Texas, similar lists of local scientists were circulated.

Alongside the allegation that the center intentionally misrepresents facts, Eugenie Scott and other critics say there is a noticeable conflict between what the CSC tells the public through the media and what they say before conservative Christian audiences. They contend that this is a studied and deliberate attempt at the obfuscation advocated by Wedge strategy author Phillip E. Johnson.

Critics can also be found outside of the scientific community. Barry W. Lynn, executive director of Americans United for Separation of Church and State has voiced First Amendment concerns over Discovery Institute's activities. He described the approach of the teach the controversy movement's proponents as "a disarming subterfuge designed to undermine solid evidence that all living things share a common ancestry":

"The movement is a veneer over a certain theological message. Every one of these groups is now actively engaged in trying to undercut sound science education by criticizing evolution," said Lynn. "It is all based on their religious ideology. Even the people who don't specifically mention religion are hard-pressed with a straight face to say who the intelligent designer is if it's not God."

In 2004, Barbara Forrest and Paul R. Gross published Creationism's Trojan Horse: The Wedge of Intelligent Design, a book documenting the history of the intelligent design movement and the Discovery Institute's Center for Science and Culture as well as critiquing ID research. Forrest and Gross referred to the group as an outgrowth of Johnson's religious mission and explored its plans for "a rigorously God-centered view of creation, including a new 'science' based solidly on theism."

== Funding ==
The center is funded through the Discovery Institute, which is largely underwritten by grants and gifts from wealthy Christian fundamentalist conservative individuals and groups, such as Howard Ahmanson Jr., Philip F. Anschutz, Richard Mellon Scaife, and the Maclellan Foundation.

Published reports place the Discovery Institute's budget for ID-related programs at over $4 million per year. The center's expenditures can be assumed to be substantial based on the scope and quality of the center's extensive public relations campaigns, materials and contributions to local and regional ID and Teach the Controversy efforts.

CSC director, Stephen C. Meyer, admits most of the center's money comes from wealthy donors from the Christian right. Howard Ahmanson Jr., who provided $1.5 million in funding that established the center, has said his goal is "the total integration of biblical law into our lives." The Maclellan Foundation commits itself to "the infallibility of the Scripture." Most Discovery Institute donors have also contributed significantly to the George W. Bush campaign. Until 1995, Ahmanson sat on the board of the Christian reconstructionist Chalcedon Foundation, and funds many causes important to the Christian right, including Christian reconstructionism.

== See also ==
- Discovery Institute intelligent design campaigns
- Kitzmiller v. Dover Area School District
