= Creationism's Trojan Horse =

2004 book by Barbara Forrest and Paul R. Gross

- Authors: Barbara Forrest; Paul R. Gross
- Subject: Intelligent design movement
- Publisher: Oxford University Press
- Publication date: 2004
- Media type: Print (hardcover and paperback)
- Pages: 416
- ISBN: 0-19-515742-7
- OCLC: 50913078
- Dewey Decimal: 231.7/652 21
- LC Class: BS659 .F67 2004

Creationism's Trojan Horse: The Wedge of Intelligent Design is a 2004 book by Barbara Forrest and Paul R. Gross on the origins of intelligent design, specifically the Discovery Institute's Center for the Renewal of Science and Culture and its wedge strategy. The authors are highly critical of what they refer to as intelligent design creationism, and document the intelligent design movement's fundamentalist Christian origins and funding.

The book grew out of an essay, "The Wedge at Work: How Intelligent Design Creationism Is Wedging Its Way into the Cultural and Academic Mainstream" which Forrest wrote for the book Intelligent Design Creationism and Its Critics (2001) edited by Robert T. Pennock. It is published by Oxford University Press and has a foreword by Steven Weinberg.

== Reviews ==
Michael Cavanaugh, President of the Institute on Religion in an Age of Science called the book "chilling", saying that "It lets one see how totalitarian religious thought can begin to take hold even of a multi-cultural free society." Karl Giberson, editor-in-chief of the Templeton Foundation's Science & Theology News chose it as the July's Editor's Choice and described it as a "remarkable analysis". Allan H. Harvey reviewed the book for Perspectives on Science and Christian Faith, the journal of the American Scientific Affiliation and criticized the authors' understanding of Christian theology, but wrote that "its thoroughness makes Creationism's Trojan Horse worth reading for those who are concerned about the movement's influence on public opinion and science education."

There were also positive reviews in the scientific literature, by Steve Olson in Science, by Rudolf A. Raff in Evolution & Development, by Barry Palevitz in BioScience and by Lawrence S. Lerner in Physics & Society.

Chris Mooney reviewed the book for his CSICOP column and used it to compare ID creationism with young Earth creationism. Biologist Bruce Grant described the authors as "heroes", saying their work was "the most thorough introduction to that enemy [intelligent design creationism]".

The book also had endorsements from Richard Dawkins, E.O. Wilson, Ursula Goodenough, Massimo Pigliucci, Eugenie C. Scott and Steven Pinker.

== Response by the Discovery Institute ==
The main subject of the book, the Discovery Institute, was highly critical of Creationism's Trojan Horse. Jonathan Witt of the Discovery Institute wrote a review in the theology journal Philosophia Christi published by the Evangelical Philosophical Society and said that it had "erroneous reasoning" and that "on every page of the book, there is a tone of paranoia."

Witt and John G. West of the Discovery Institute also had an article published in the November 2004 edition of Science & Theology News entitled "Unraveling The Threads of Darwinist Paranoia". A month later, Forrest and Gross wrote in Science & Theology News, with a reply by Witt and West. Ian Musgrave contributed a letter to the editor in the February 2005 edition replying to West and Witt's reply.

== Research for Kitzmiller v. Dover ==
The research which Forrest in particular did led to her appearing as an expert witness for the plaintiffs at the Kitzmiller v. Dover Area School District intelligent design trial, in which intelligent design was ruled to be religious creationism and not science, and thus could not be taught as science in public school classrooms of Dover, Pennsylvania, because of the Establishment Clause of the US Constitution.

During the trial, pre-publication drafts of the textbook at the center of the controversy Of Pandas and People were uncovered which revealed its creationist origins and how it had changed from using creationist terminology to using intelligent design terminology as a result of the U.S. Supreme Court decision in Edwards v. Aguillard. This formed an important part of Forrest's testimony.

A few days before Forrest's testimony, the Discovery Institute published its own "brief history of the scientific theory of intelligent design" by Jonathan Witt, in which he attempts to diminish the importance of Edwards v. Aguillard, claiming instead that the origin of intelligent design was much older.

== Editions ==
- Hardcover: 416 pages, Publisher: Oxford University Press, United States (2004) ISBN 978-0-19-515742-0
- Paperback: 416 pages, Publisher: Oxford University Press, United States (2007) ISBN 978-0-19-531973-6
