= Teach the Controversy =

Discovery Institute campaign to promote intelligent design

The "Teach the Controversy" campaign of the Discovery Institute seeks to promote the pseudoscientific principle of intelligent design (a variant of traditional creationism) as part of its attempts to discredit the teaching of evolution in United States public high school science courses. Scientific organizations, including the American Association for the Advancement of Science (AAAS), have noted that the institute claims that there is a scientific controversy where in fact none exists.

The campaign was started with the 1999 article "Teaching the Controversy: Darwinism, Design and the Public School Science Curriculum", which was published by the Foundation for Thought and Ethics. The Discovery Institute is a conservative Christian think tank based in Seattle, Washington. The overall goals of the movement are "to defeat scientific materialism" and "to replace [it] with the theistic understanding that nature and human beings are created by God". It claims that fairness requires educating students with a "critical analysis of evolution" in which "the full range of scientific views", evolution's "unresolved issues", and the "scientific weaknesses of evolutionary theory" are presented and evaluated and in which intelligent design concepts such as irreducible complexity are presented.

The scientific community and science education organizations, such as the AAAS, have replied that there is no scientific controversy regarding the validity of the theory of evolution, and that any "controversy" exists solely in the realm of religion and politics.

In December 2005, a U.S. federal court has agreed with the majority of scientific organizations in their evaluation that the institute has manufactured such a controversy by promoting the false perception that evolution is the subject of wide controversy and debate within the scientific community. In Kitzmiller v. Dover Area School District, the court ruled that intelligent design is not science and "cannot uncouple itself from its creationist, and thus religious, antecedents", and therefore requiring public schools to present intelligent design as an "alternative" to the theory of evolution in science classes is a violation of the Establishment Clause of the First Amendment of the U.S. Constitution. The court found that proponents of intelligent design "have sought to avoid the scientific scrutiny which we have now determined that [intelligent design] cannot withstand by advocating that the controversy, but not ID itself, should be taught in science class. This tactic is at best disingenuous, and at worst a canard."

Intelligent design has been rejected by essentially all of the members of the scientific community, including the numerical estimate of 99.9 percent of scientists.

== Origin of the campaign name ==
The term "teach the controversy" originated with Gerald Graff, a professor of English and education at the University of Illinois at Chicago, as a reminder to teach that established knowledge is created in a crucible of debate and controversy. He argued that "schools and colleges should respond to the then-emerging culture wars over education by bringing their disputes into academic courses themselves. Instead of assuming that we have to resolve debates over, say, whether Huckleberry Finn is a racist text or a stirring critique of racism, teachers should present students with the conflicting arguments and use the debate itself to arouse their interest in the life of the mind"; he further expanded on this idea in his 1992 book Beyond the Culture Wars: How Teaching the Conflicts Can Revitalize American Education.

To the chagrin of Graff, who has described himself as a left-liberal secularist, the idea was later appropriated by Phillip E. Johnson, program advisor at the Discovery Institute and father of the intelligent design (ID) movement. Discussing the 1999–2000 Kansas State Board of Education controversy over the teaching of intelligent design in public school classrooms, Johnson wrote "What educators in Kansas and elsewhere should be doing is to 'teach the controversy'." In his book Johnson proposed casting the conflicting points of view and agendas as a scholarly controversy. Johnson's usage differs fundamentally and disingenuously from Graff's original use of the concept. While Graff advocated that a comprehensive understanding of what are considered to be "established" concepts must include teaching the debates and conflicts by which they were established, Johnson appropriated the phrase to cast doubt upon the very process and results of the scientific method of establishing knowledge through debate and conflict based on facts determined by experimentation.

The phrase was picked up by the Discovery Institute affiliates Stephen C. Meyer, David K. DeWolf, and Mark E. DeForrest in their 1999 article "Teaching the Controversy: Darwinism, Design and the Public School Science Curriculum" published by the Foundation for Thought and Ethics. This foundation also publishes the pseudoscientific intelligent design biology textbook Of Pandas and People suggested as an alternative to mainstream science and biology textbooks in the Critical Analysis of Evolution lesson plans proposed by proponents of the Teach the Controversy campaign.

== Development of the strategy ==
Comparisons of the drafts of the intelligent design textbook Of Pandas and People before and after the 1987 Edwards v. Aguillard ruling showed that the definition given in the book for "creation science" in pre Edwards drafts is identical to the definition of "intelligent design" in post Edwards drafts; cognates of the word creation—creationism and creationist, which appeared approximately 150 times were deliberately and systematically replaced with the phrase 'intelligent design'; and the changes occurred shortly after the Supreme Court ruled in Edwards that creation science is religious and cannot be taught in public school science classes.

The campaign was devised by Stephen C. Meyer and Discovery Institute founder and President Bruce Chapman as a compromise strategy in March 2002. They had come to the realisation that the dispute over intelligent design's (lack of) scientific standing was complicating their efforts to have evolution challenged in the science classroom. This strategy was designed to move the focus onto an approach that stresses open debate and evolution's purported weakness, but does not require students to study intelligent design. The intention was to create doubt over evolution and avoid the question of whether the intelligent designer was God, while giving the institute time to strengthen their purported theory of intelligent design. Another advantage of this strategy was to allay teacher fears of legal action.

== Employment of the strategy ==
The Discovery Institute's strategy has been for the institute itself or groups acting on its behalf to lobby state and local boards of education, and local, state and federal policymakers to enact policies and/or laws, often in the form of textbook disclaimers and the language of state science standards, that undermine or remove evolutionary theory from the public school science classroom by portraying it as "controversial" and "in crisis;" a portrayal that stands in contrast to the overwhelming consensus of the scientific community that there is no controversy, that evolution is one of the best-supported theories in all of science, and that whatever controversy does exist is political and religious, not scientific. The Teach the Controversy strategy has benefitted from 'stacking' municipal, county and state school boards with intelligent design proponents as alluded to in the Discovery Institute's Wedge Strategy.

As the primary organizer and promoter of the Teach the Controversy campaign, the Discovery Institute has played a central role in nearly all intelligent design cases, often working behind the scenes to orchestrate, underwrite and support local campaigns and intelligent design groups such as the Intelligent Design Network. It has provided support ranging from material assistance to federal, state and regionally elected representatives in the drafting of bills to the provision of support and advice to individual parents confronting their school boards. DI's goal is to move from battles over standards to curriculum writing and textbook adoption while undermining the central positions of evolution in biology and methodological naturalism in science. In order to make their proposals more palatable, the Institute and its supporters claim to advocate presenting evidence both for and against evolution, thus encouraging students to evaluate the evidence.

Though Teach the Controversy is presented by its proponents as encouraging academic freedom, it, along with the Santorum Amendment, is viewed by many academics as a threat to academic freedom and is rejected by the National Science Teachers Association, and the American Association for the Advancement of Science. The American Society for Clinical Investigation's Journal of Clinical Investigation describes the Teach the Controversy strategy and campaign as a "hoax" and that "the controversy is manufactured".

Along with the objection that there is no scientific controversy to teach, another common objection is that the Teach the Controversy campaign and intelligent design arise out of a Christian fundamentalist and evangelistic movement that calls for broad social, academic and political changes. Intelligent design proponents argue their concepts and motives should be given independent consideration. Those critical of intelligent design see the two as intertwined and inseparable, citing the foundational documents of the movement such as the Wedge Document and statements made by intelligent design proponents to their constituents. The judge in the Kitzmiller v. Dover Area School District trial considered testimony and evidence from both sides on the question of the motives of intelligent design proponents when he ruled that "ID cannot uncouple itself from its creationist, and thus religious, antecedents" and "that ID is an interesting theological argument, but that it is not science."

In the debate surrounding the linking of the motives of intelligent design proponents to their arguments, following the Kansas evolution hearings the chairman of the Kansas school board, Steve Abrams, cited in The New York Times as saying that though he's a creationist who believes that God created the universe 6,500 years ago, he is able to keep the two separate:

In my personal faith, yes, I am a creationist, ... But that doesn't have anything to do with science. I can separate them. ... my personal views of Scripture have no room in the science classroom.

Afterward, Lawrence Krauss, a Case Western Reserve University physicist and astronomer, in a New York Times essay said:

A key concern should not be whether Dr. Abrams's religious views have a place in the classroom, but rather how someone whose religious views require a denial of essentially all modern scientific knowledge can be chairman of a state school board. ... As we work to improve the abysmal state of science education in our public schools, we will continue to do battle with those who feel that knowledge is a threat to religious faith ... we should remember that the battle is not against faith, but against ignorance.

A rudimentary form of the "teach the controversy" strategy had emerged first among creationists following the Supreme Court's Edwards v. Aguillard decision. The Institute for Creation Research (ICR) prepared an evaluation of what the movement should try next, suggesting "school boards and teachers should be strongly encouraged at least to stress the scientific evidences and arguments against evolution in their classes ... even if they don't wish to recognize these as evidences and arguments for creationism." Glenn Branch of the National Center for Science Education says this comment shows that the "teach the controversy" strategy was "pioneered in the wake of Edwards v. Aguillard."

Prior to the September 2005 start of the Kitzmiller v. Dover Area School District trial, the "Dover trial," prominent intelligent design proponents gradually shifted to a "Teach the Controversy" strategy. They had realized that mandates requiring the teaching of intelligent design were unlikely to survive challenges based on the Establishment Clause of the First Amendment, and that an unfavorable ruling had the effect of legally ruling intelligent design a form of religious creationism.

Thus, the Discovery Institute repositioned itself. It publicly abandoned advocating for any policies or laws that required the teaching of intelligent design in favor of a Teach the Controversy strategy. Institute Fellows reasoned that once the "fact" that a controversy indeed exists had been established in the public's mind, then the reintroduction of intelligent design into public school criteria would be much less controversial later.

The best illustration of this shift in strategy is comparing the Discovery Institute's 1999 guidebook Intelligent Design in Public School Science Curricula which concludes "school boards have the authority to permit, and even encourage, teaching about design theory as an alternative to Darwinian evolution" to 2006 statements by Phillip E. Johnson, that his intent was never to use public school education as the forum for his ideas and that he hoped to ignite and perpetuate a debate in universities and among the higher echelon of scientific thinkers.

With the December 2005 ruling in Kitzmiller v. Dover Area School District, wherein Judge John E. Jones III concluded that intelligent design is not science, intelligent design proponents were left with the Teach the Controversy strategy as the most likely method left to realize the goals stated in the wedge document. Thus, the Teach the Controversy strategy has become the primary thrust of the Discovery Institute in promoting its aims. Just as intelligent design is a stalking horse for the campaign against what its proponents claim is a materialist foundation in science that precludes God, Teach the Controversy has become a stalking horse for intelligent design. But the Dover ruling also characterized "teaching the controversy" as part of a religious ploy.

== Shift to the "Critical Analysis of Evolution" ==
By May 2006 the Discovery Institute sought to replace the failed "teach the controversy" strategy with a strategy broadened to include examples of other supposedly legitimate scientific controversies. In Ohio and Michigan where school boards were again reviewing science curricula standards the Discovery Institute and its allies proposed lesson plans that included global warming, cloning and stem cell research as further examples of controversies that are akin to the alleged scientific controversy over evolution. All four topics are widely accepted by the majority of the scientific community as legitimate science, and all four are areas where US political conservatives have been known to be critical of the scientific consensus. Members of the scientific community have responded to this tactic by pointing out that like evolution whatever controversy may exist over cloning and stem cell research has been largely social and political, while dissident viewpoints over global warming are often viewed as pseudoscience. Richard B. Hoppe, holder of a Ph.D. in Experimental Psychology from the University of Minnesota, described the tactic in the following way:

Like the attacks on evolution, the attack on climate science is driven by the sectarian conviction that 'materialistic' science is untrustworthy and must be replaced. As with intelligent design creationism, science-deniers' so-called evidence takes the form of claims for the insufficiency of current scientific explanations rather than concrete, testable alternative hypotheses. As in the evolution debate, religious extremists use the clever strategy of denigrating the scientific consensus on causality (global warming is human-caused via pollution) by pretending it contrasts sharply with an alternative scientific theory that, properly-understood, is really just a more nuanced view that's not really in opposition (current global warming is part of the earth’s natural cycle but is being exacerbated by pollution). This exaggerates the intensity of normal scientific debate in order to suggest there's something wrong with climate science, and then uses this manufactured controversy to cloak the anti-science view and smuggle it into classrooms—sectarian religious evangelism masquerading as science.

With the Dover ruling describing "teach the controversy" as "at best disingenuous, and at worst a canard", intelligent design proponents have moved to a fallback position, emphasizing contrived flaws in evolution and overemphasizing remaining questions in the theory what they call the Critical Analysis of Evolution. The Critical Analysis of Evolution strategy is viewed by Nick Matzke and other intelligent design critics as a means of teaching all the intelligent design arguments without using the intelligent design label. Critical Analysis of Evolution continues the themes of the "teach the controversy" strategy, emphasizing what they say are the "criticisms" of evolutionary theory and "arguments against evolution," which continues to be portrayed as "a theory in crisis." Early drafts of the Critical Analysis of Evolution lesson plan referred to the lesson as the "great evolution debate"; one of the early drafts of the lesson plan had one section titled "Conducting the Macroevolution Debate". In a subsequent draft, it was changed to "Conducting the Critical Analysis Activity". The wording for the two sections is nearly identical, with just "debate" changed to "critical analysis activity" wherever it appeared, in the manner of how intelligent design proponents simply replaced "creation" with "intelligent design" in Of Pandas and People to repackage a creation science textbook into an intelligent design textbook.

== Repercussions ==
The campaigns of intelligent design proponents seeking curricular challenges have been disruptive, divisive and expensive for the affected communities. In pursuing the goal of establishing intelligent design at the expense of evolution in public school science classes, intelligent design groups have threatened and isolated high school science teachers, school board members and parents who opposed their efforts. The campaigns run by intelligent design groups place teachers in the difficult position of arguing against their employers while the legal challenges to local school districts are costly, diverting funding away from education and into court battles. For example, as a result of the Dover trial, the Dover Area School District was forced to pay $1,000,011 in legal fees and damages for pursuing a policy of teaching the controversy.

Four days after the six-week Dover trial concluded, all eight of the Dover school board members who were up for reelection were voted out of office. Televangelist Pat Robertson in turn told the citizens of Dover, "If there is a disaster in your area, don't turn to God. You just rejected him from your city." Robertson said if they have future problems in Dover, "I recommend they call on Charles Darwin. Maybe he can help them."

Critics, like Wesley R. Elsberry, say the Discovery Institute has cynically manufactured much of the political and religious controversy to further its agenda, pointing to statements of prominent proponents like Johnson:

Whether educational authorities allow the schools to teach about the controversy or not, public recognition that there is something seriously wrong with Darwinian orthodoxy is going to keep on growing. While the educators stonewall, our job is to continue building the community of people who understand the difference between a science that tests its theories against the evidence, and a pseudoscience that protects its key doctrines by imposing philosophical rules and erecting legal barriers to freedom of thought.

To the absence of actual scientific controversy over the validity of evolutionary theory, Johnson said:

If the science educators continue to pretend that there is no controversy to teach, perhaps the television networks and the newspapers will take over the responsibility of informing the public.

And to the resistance of science educators over portraying evolution as controversial or disputed, Johnson said:

If the public school educators will not "teach the controversy," our informal network can do the job for them. In time, the educators will be running to catch up.

Elsberry and others allege that statements like Johnson's are proof that the alleged scientific controversy intelligent design proponents seek to have taught is a product of the institute's members and staff. In the Dover trial's ruling the judge wrote that intelligent design proponents had misrepresented the scientific status of evolution.

According to published reports, the nonprofit Discovery Institute received grants and gifts totaling $4.1 million for 2003 from 22 foundations. Of these, two-thirds had primarily religious missions. The institute spends more than $1 million a year for research, polls, lobbying and media pieces that support intelligent design and their Teach the Controversy campaign and is employing the same Washington, D.C. public relations firm that promoted the Contract with America.

== Political action ==
The Discovery Institute aggressively promoted its Teach the Controversy campaign and intelligent design to the public, education officials and public policymakers. Its efforts were largely aimed at conservative Christian policymakers, to whom it was cast as a counterbalance to the liberal influences of "atheistic scientists" and "Dogmatic Darwinists." As a measure of their success in this effort, on 1 August 2005, during a round-table interview with reporters from five Texas newspapers, President Bush said that he believes schools should discuss intelligent design alongside evolution when teaching students about the origin of life. Bush, a conservative Christian, declined to go into detail on his personal views of the origin of life, but advocated the Teach the Controversy approach, saying, "I think that part of education is to expose people to different schools of thought... you're asking me whether or not people ought to be exposed to different ideas, the answer is yes." Christian conservatives, a substantial part of Bush's voting base, were central in promoting the Teach the Controversy campaign.

In some state battles, the ties of Teach the Controversy and intelligent design proponents to the Discovery Institute's political and social activities were made public, resulting in their efforts being temporarily thwarted. The Discovery Institute took the view that all publicity is good and no defeat is real. The Institute showed a willingness to back off, even to not advocate for the inclusion of ID, to ensure that all science teachers were required to portray evolution as a "theory in crisis." The institute's strategy is to move from standards battles, to curriculum writing, to textbook adoption, and back again, doing whatever it took to undermine the central position of evolution in biology. Critics of this strategy and the movement contended that the intelligent design controversy diverts much time, effort and tax money away from the actual education of children.

=== Political battles involving the Discovery Institute ===
- 2000 Congressional briefing: In 2000, the leading ID proponents operating through the Discovery Institute held a congressional briefing in Washington, D.C., to promote ID to lawmakers. Sen. Rick Santorum was and continues to be one of ID's most vocal supporters. One result of this briefing was that Sen. Santorum inserted pro-ID language into the No Child Left Behind bill calling for students to be taught why evolution "generates so much continuing controversy," an assertion heavily promoted by the Discovery Institute.
- 2001 Santorum Amendment: As a result of the 2000 Congressional briefing, the Discovery Institute drafted and lobbied for the Santorum Amendment to the No Child Left Behind education act. The amendment encouraged the "teach the controversy" approach to evolution education. The amendment was passed by the U.S. Senate, but was left out of the final version of the Act, and remains only in highly modified form in the conference report, where it does not carry the weight of law. The conference report language is commonly touted by the Discovery Institute as model language for bills and curricula. The Discovery Institute lobbies states, counties, and municipalities, and offers them legal analysis and Institute-developed curricula and text books they proclaim meet constitutional criteria established by the courts in previous creationism/evolution First Amendment cases.
- 2002-2006 Ohio Board of Education: The Discovery Institute proposed a model lesson plan that featured intelligent design prominently in its curricula. It was adopted in part in October 2002, with the Board's advising that the science standards do "not mandate the teaching or testing of intelligent design." This was touted by the Discovery Institute as a significant victory. By February 2006 the Ohio Board of Education voted 11–4 to delete the science standard and correlating lesson plan adopted in 2002. The board also rejected a competing plan from the institute to request a legal opinion from the state attorney general on the constitutionality of the science standards. Intelligent design proponents pledged to force another vote on the issue.
- 2005 Kansas evolution hearings: A series of hearings instigated by the institute held in Topeka, Kansas May 2005 by the Kansas State Board of Education to review changes how the origin of life would be taught in the state's public high school science classes. The hearings were boycotted by the scientific community, and views expressed represented largely those of intelligent design advocates. The result of the hearings was the adoption of new science standards by the Republican-dominated board in defiance of the State Board Science Hearing Committee that relied upon the institute's Critical Analysis of Evolution lesson plan and adopted the institute's Teach the Controversy approach. In August 2006 conservative Republicans lost their majority on the board in a primary election. The moderate Republican and Democrats gaining seats vowed to overturn the 2005 school science standards and adopt those recommended by a State Board Science Hearing Committee that were rejected by the previous board.
- 2005 Kitzmiller v. Dover Area School District: Eleven parents of students in the school district of Dover, Pennsylvania, sued the Dover Area School District over a statement that the school board required to be read aloud in ninth-grade science classes when evolution was taught endorsing intelligent design as an alternative to evolution. The plaintiffs successfully argued that intelligent design is a form of creationism, and that the school board policy thus violated the Establishment Clause of the First Amendment. In December, 2005 United States federal court judge John E. Jones III ruled that intelligent design is not science and is essentially religious in nature.

== Criticism ==
The theory of evolution is accepted by the vast majority of biologists and by the scientific community in general, in such overwhelming numbers that the theory of evolution is viewed as having scientific consensus. Over 70 scientific societies, institutions, and other professional groups representing tens of thousands of individual scientists have issued policy statements supporting evolution education and opposing intelligent design. Scientific controversies are minor and concern the details of the mechanisms of evolution, not the validity of the overarching theory of evolution. In the absence of an actual professional controversy between groups of experts on evolution, critics say intelligent design proponents have merely renamed the conflict that already existed between biologists and creationists, and that the controversy to which intelligent design proponents refer is political in nature and thus, by definition, outside of the realm of science and scientific educational curricula. Critics contend that intelligent design proponents ignore this point by continuing to make the claim of a "scientific controversy." According to Thomas Dixon, "The 'controversy' in question has not arisen from any substantial scientific disagreement but is the product of a concerted public relations exercise aimed at the Christian parents of America."

For example, the National Association of Biology Teachers, in a statement endorsing evolution as noncontroversial, quoted Theodosius Dobzhansky: "Nothing in biology makes sense except in the light of evolution" and went on to state that the quote "accurately reflects the central, unifying role of evolution in biology. The theory of evolution provides a framework that explains both the history of life and the ongoing adaptation of organisms to environmental challenges and changes." They emphasized that "Scientists have firmly established evolution as an important natural process" and that "The selection of topics covered in a biology curriculum should accurately reflect the principles of biological science. Teaching biology in an effective and scientifically honest manner requires that evolution be taught in a standards-based instructional framework with effective classroom discussions and laboratory experiences."

Prominent evolutionary biologists such as Richard Dawkins and Jerry Coyne have proposed various "controversies" that are worth teaching, instead of intelligent design. Dawkins compares teaching intelligent design in schools to teaching flat earthism: perfectly fine in a history class but not in science. "If you give the idea that there are two schools of thought within science, one that says the earth is round and one that says the earth is flat, you are misleading children". Tufts University Professor of Philosophy Daniel C. Dennett, author of Darwin's Dangerous Idea, describes how they generate a sense of controversy: "The proponents of intelligent design use an ingenious ploy that works something like this: First you misuse or misdescribe some scientist's work. Then you get an angry rebuttal. Then, instead of dealing forthrightly with the charges leveled, you cite the rebuttal as evidence that there is a 'controversy' to teach".

Critics of the Teach the Controversy movement and strategy can also be found outside of the scientific community. Barry W. Lynn, executive director of Americans United for Separation of Church and State, described the approach of the movement's proponents as "a disarming subterfuge designed to undermine solid evidence that all living things share a common ancestry." "The movement is a veneer over a certain theological message. Every one of these groups is now actively engaged in trying to undercut sound science education by criticizing evolution," said Lynn. "It is all based on their religious ideology. Even the people who don't specifically mention religion are hard-pressed with a straight face to say who the intelligent designer is if it's not God".

=== The Discovery Institute ===
According to critics of the Discovery Institute's efforts through the Teach the Controversy campaign and the intelligent design movement, the Wedge strategy betrays the institute's political rather than scientific and educational purpose. The Discovery Institute and its Center for Science and Culture (CSC) has an overarching conservative Christian social and political agenda that seeks to redefine both law and science and how they are conducted, with the stated goal of a religious "renewal" of American culture.

Critics also allege that the Discovery Institute has a long-standing record of misrepresenting research, law and its own policy and agenda and that of others:

- In announcing the Teach the Controversy strategy in 2002, the Discovery Institute's Stephen C. Meyer presented an annotated bibliography of 44 peer-reviewed scientific articles that were said to raise significant challenges to key tenets of what was referred to as "Darwinian evolution." In response to this claim the National Center for Science Education, an organization that works in collaboration with National Academy of Sciences, the National Association of Biology Teachers, and the National Science Teachers Association that support the teaching of evolution in public schools, contacted the authors of the papers listed and twenty-six scientists, representing thirty-four of the papers, responded. None of the authors considered his or her research to provide evidence against evolution.
- The Discovery Institute, following the policies outlined by Phillip E. Johnson, obfuscates its agenda. Opposed to the public statements to the contrary made by the Discovery Institute, Johnson has admitted that the goal of intelligent design movement is to cast creationism as a scientific concept:

- Our strategy has been to change the subject a bit so that we can get the issue of intelligent design, which really means the reality of God, before the academic world and into the schools.
- This isn't really, and never has been a debate about science. It's about religion and philosophy.
- If we understand our own times, we will know that we should affirm the reality of God by challenging the domination of materialism and naturalism in the world of the mind. With the assistance of many friends I have developed a strategy for doing this....We call our strategy the 'wedge.'
- So the question is: "How to win?" That’s when I began to develop what you now see full-fledged in the "wedge" strategy: "Stick with the most important thing" —the mechanism and the building up of information. Get the Bible and the Book of Genesis out of the debate because you do not want to raise the so-called Bible-science dichotomy. Phrase the argument in such a way that you can get it heard in the secular academy and in a way that tends to unify the religious dissenters. That means concentrating on, "Do you need a Creator to do the creating, or can nature do it on its own?" and refusing to get sidetracked onto other issues, which people are always trying to do.

— Phillip E. Johnson

- Rob Boston of the Americans United for Separation of Church and State described Johnson's vision of the Wedge as: "The objective [of the Wedge Strategy] is to convince people that Darwinism is inherently atheistic, thus shifting the debate from creationism vs. evolution to the existence of God vs. the non-existence of God. From there people are introduced to 'the truth' of the Bible and then 'the question of sin' and finally 'introduced to Jesus.'"
- Instead of producing original scientific data to support ID's claims, the Discovery Institute has promoted ID politically to the public, education officials and public policymakers through its Teach the Controversy campaign.

Johnson's statements validate the criticisms leveled by those who allege that the Discovery Institute and its allied organizations are merely stripping the obvious religious content from their anti-evolution assertions as a means of avoiding the legal restriction on establishment. They argue that ID is simply an attempt to put a patina of secularity on top of what is a fundamentally religious belief and agenda.

Given the history of the Discovery Institute as an organization committed to opposing any scientific theory inconsistent with "the theistic understanding that nature and human beings are created by God", many scientists regard the movement purely as a ploy to insert creationism into the science curriculum rather than as a serious attempt to discuss scientific evidence. In the words of Eugenie Scott of the National Center for Education:

Teach the controversy is a deliberately ambiguous phrase. It means 'pretend to students that scientists are arguing over whether evolution took place.' This is not happening. I mean you go to the scientific journals, you go to universities... and you ask the professors, is there an argument going on about whether living things had common ancestors? They'll look at you blankly. This is not a controversy.

Though Teach the Controversy proponents cite the current public policy statements of the Discovery Institute as belying the criticisms that their strategy is a creationist ploy and decry critics as biased in failing to recognize that the intelligent design movement's Teach the Controversy strategy as really just a question of science with no religion involved, is itself belied by Discovery Institute's former published policy statements, its "Wedge Document", and statements made to its constituency by its leadership, and in particular Phillip E. Johnson.

Writes Johnson in the foreword to Creation, Evolution, & Modern Science (2000):

The Intelligent Design movement starts with the recognition that "In the beginning was the Word," and "In the beginning God created." Establishing that point isn't enough, but it is absolutely essential to the rest of the gospel message. ... The first thing that has to be done is to get the Bible out of the discussion. ...This is not to say that the biblical issues are unimportant; the point is rather that the time to address them will be after we have separated materialist prejudice from scientific fact.

Johnson's words bolster the claims of those critics who cite Johnson's admission that the ultimate goal of the campaign is getting "the issue of intelligent design, which really means the reality of God, before the academic world and into the schools".

Amid this political and religious controversy the clear, categorical and oft-repeated view of established national and international scientific organizations remains that there is no scientific controversy over teaching evolution in public schools.

=== University course ===
George Mason University Biology Department introduced a 1-credit course on the creation/evolution controversy, and Emmett Holman, an associate professor of philosophy from the university, found that as students learn more about biology, they find objections to evolution less convincing. He concluded that "teaching the controversy" would undermine creationists’ criticisms, and that the scientific community's resistance to this approach was bad public relations. Rather than being taught in a mainstream science course, it would be a separate elective course, probably taught by a scientist but called a course on "philosophy of science", "history of science", or "politics of science and religion".

Biologist Tom A. Langen argues in a journal letter entitled "What is right with 'teaching the controversy'?" that offering a specific course about this controversy will help students understand the demarcation between science and other ways of obtaining knowledge about nature. Similar positions have been expressed by atheists Julian Baggini and Aaron Sloman.

== See also ==
- Howard Ahmanson, Jr
- Argument to moderation
- Creation and evolution in public education
- Darwin on Trial
- False balance
- Flying Spaghetti Monster
- Inherit the Wind
- Santorum Amendment
