= Signature in the Cell =

2009 book by Stephen C. Meyer

Signature in the Cell: DNA and the Evidence for Intelligent Design
- Cover of the first edition
- Author: Stephen C. Meyer
- Language: English
- Subject: Intelligent design
- Publisher: HarperOne
- Publication date: June 23, 2009
- Publication place: United States
- Media type: Print (Hardcover and Paperback)
- Pages: 624
- ISBN: 0061472786
- Preceded by: Darwinism, Design and Public Education

Signature in the Cell: DNA and the Evidence for Intelligent Design is a 2009 book about intelligent design by philosopher and intelligent design advocate Stephen C. Meyer. The book was well received by some within the conservative, intelligent design and evangelical communities, but several other reviewers were critical and wrote that Meyer's claims are incorrect.

== Summary ==
According to Meyer, historical sciences seek to establish past causes of events using three criteria: (1) that a proposed cause was present, (2) that independent evidence establishes that the proposed cause can indeed produce that event, and (3) that there is an absence of evidence of other possible causes. In his view, the first form of life would have been a functioning, self-replicating, and protein-synthesizing system of DNA and proteins, and as such an information-rich system. Meyer believes that chemical evolution, chance, and chemical necessity have not been proven capable of producing information-rich systems, and that intelligent design is therefore the best explanation for the emergence of life on this planet. He argues that definitions of science that would preclude intelligent design from being a science also preclude many other fields, already established as science, from being science. Meyer believes the designing mind is the God described by the Christian religion. He acknowledges that this may affect the motivations behind his theory.

== Reception ==
The book has been well received by some within the conservative, intelligent design and evangelical communities. It was not reviewed by scientific journals or popular science magazines.

Philosopher Thomas Nagel submitted the book to the "2009 Books of the Year" supplement for The Times. Stephen Fletcher, chemist at Loughborough University, responded in The Times Literary Supplement that Nagel was "promot[ing] the book to the rest of us using statements that are factually incorrect." Fletcher explained that, "Natural selection is in fact a chemical process as well as a biological process, and it was operating for about half a billion years before the earliest cellular life forms appear in the fossil record." In another publication, Fletcher wrote that "I am afraid that reality has overtaken Meyer’s book and its flawed reasoning" in pointing out scientific problems with Meyer's work by citing how RNA "survived and evolved into our own human protein-making factory, and continues to make our fingers and toes."

Darrel Falk, co-president of the BioLogos Foundation and a biology professor at Point Loma Nazarene University, reviewed the book and used it as an example of why he does not support the intelligent design movement. In 2010 the BioLogos Foundation published Meyer's response to Falk. The response criticizes Falk's characterization of Meyer's credentials as well as the lack of any evidence from Falk that the premise of his book is faulty.

The American Scientific Affiliation, a Christian organization of scientists and others, published a detailed analysis of the book's assertions by their executive director, physicist Randall Isaac.

Steve Matheson, a developmental biologist at Calvin College (an institution of the Christian Reformed Church), wrote an analysis critical of the book. In a post on The Panda's Thumb, Richard Hoppe concluded that the book failed to make a strong case for ID.

The Discovery Institute published a collection of responses to critics edited by David Klinghoffer.
