= John G. West =

Senior fellow at the Seattle-based Discovery Institute and intelligent design proponent

John G. West is vice president and a senior fellow at the Seattle-based Discovery Institute (DI), and managing director of its Center for Science and Culture (CSC), which serves as the main hub of the intelligent design movement.

== Biography ==
West graduated from the University of Washington with a bachelor's degree in communication studies specializing in journalism in 1986. From 1986 to 1989, he was the managing editor of the organization "Public Research, Syndicated," which distributed essays on public affairs to more than 700 daily and weekly newspapers. He then earned his Ph.D. in government from Claremont Graduate University in 1992.

West has taught political science and history courses at California State University, San Bernardino and Azusa Pacific University, and was an associate professor of political science at Seattle Pacific University (a private Christian university) where he chaired the Political Science and Geography department.

West has been co-director of the CSC since its formation in 1996, out of discussions between himself and Stephen C. Meyer, which led to an invitation from DI president Bruce Chapman to create it as a unit within the DI. At the 1995 DI-sponsored 'Death of Materialism' conference out of which it was born, he delivered an address entitled 'The Death of Materialism and the Renewal of Culture', which was an early articulation of the Wedge Strategy (later leaked in 1998 as what became known as the Wedge Document, with an introduction identical to West's opening paragraphs).

== Darwin Day in America ==
In both his 2007 book Darwin Day in America and in lectures, West presents his case for linking Darwin to the eugenics movement. Historian of Science Mark Borrello criticized West's argument in writing, "West means blaming biologists in general and Darwinian theory in particular for the coerced sterilization laws that passed many state legislatures in the first half of the 20th century. This will not do. Historians of science know that the passage of the first sterilization laws at the beginning of the 20th century occurred during the 'eclipse of Darwinism'." Borrello further states that this popular support for eugenics was matched with popular opposition to teaching evolution. Moreover, modern scientists, such as Stephen Jay Gould spoke out against eugenics.

== Bibliography ==
- The Politics of Revelation and Reason: Religion and Civic Life in the New Nation (American Political Thought) (1996)
- Public life in the shadowlands: What C.S. Lewis can teach us about politics (1998)
- The C.S. Lewis Readers' Encyclopedia, (ed., with Jeffry D. West) (1998)
- Encyclopedia of Religion in American Politics (American Political Landscape Series), with Iain Maclean, and Jeffrey D. Schultz (1998)
- The Theology of Welfare: Protestants, Catholics, & Jews in Conversation About Welfare, with Sonja E. West (2000)
- Celebrating Middle-Earth: The Lord of the Rings As a Defense of Western Civilization (2002)
- Traipsing into Evolution: Intelligent Design and the Kitzmiller v. Dover Decision, with David K. Dewolf, Casey Luskin, and Jonathan Witt (2006)
- Darwin's Conservatives: The Misguided Quest (2006)
- Darwin Day In America: How Our Politics and Culture Have Been Dehumanized in the Name of Science (2007)
- The Magician's Twin: C. S. Lewis on Science, Scientism, and Society (2012)
- Walt Disney and Live Action: The Disney Studio's Live-Action Features of the 1950s and 60s (2016)

== See also ==
- Center for Science and Culture (Part of the Discovery Institute)
- Discovery Institute intelligent design campaigns
