= Jeff Simmons =

Jeff Simmons is the name of:

- Jeff Simmons (musician) (born 1949), former member of Frank Zappa's Mothers of Invention
- Jeff Simmons (racing driver) (born 1976), American race car driver
- Jeff Simmons (American football) (born 1960), NFL player
- Jeffery Simmons (born 1997), professional American football player

== See also ==
- Geoff Simmons (born 1974), New Zealand economist and politician
- Geoffrey Simmons (born 1943), American medical doctor, author, and intelligent design advocate
