= Stephen C. Meyer =

American advocate of intelligent design creationism

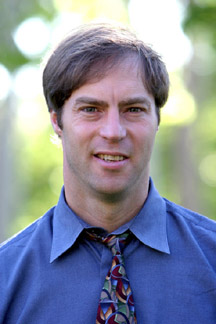
- Born: 1958 (age 67–68); United States
- Occupations: Professor; historian; author

Education
- Education: Whitworth College (BS, BA); University of Cambridge (MPhil, PhD)
- Thesis: Of clues and causes: A methodological interpretation of origin of life studies (1991)
- Doctoral advisor: Michael Hoskin

Philosophical work
- School: Philosophy of science
- Institutions: Whitworth College; Palm Beach Atlantic University; Center for Science and Culture
- Main interests: Intelligent design
- Notable works: Signature in the Cell (2009)
- Website: stephencmeyer.org

Stephen Charles Meyer (/ˈmaɪ.ər/; born 1958) is an American philosopher of science and historian. He is an advocate of intelligent design, a pseudoscientific creationist argument for the existence of God. Meyer was a founder of the Center for Science and Culture (CSC) of the Discovery Institute (DI), which is the main organization behind the intelligent design movement. Before joining the institute, Meyer was a professor at Whitworth College. He is a senior fellow of the DI and the director of the CSC.

== Early life and education ==
Meyer was born in 1958, and grew up near Seattle, Washington. He was raised as a Catholic. He graduated with honors, cum laude, from Whitworth College in 1981 with two bachelor's degrees: a Bachelor of Science in earth science and a Bachelor of Arts in physics. He then was employed as a geophysicist at the Atlantic Richfield Company (ARCO) in Dallas from November 1981 to December 1985. While working for ARCO, Meyer specialized in digital signal processing and seismic survey interpretation.

In 1986, Meyer was awarded a scholarship by Rotary International to pursue graduate studies in England. He earned a Master of Philosophy (M.Phil.) in 1987 and his Doctor of Philosophy (Ph.D.) in the history of science and philosophy of science in 1991 from the University of Cambridge. His doctoral dissertation at Cambridge was titled, "Of Clues and Causes: A Methodological Interpretation of Origin-of-Life Research".

== Academic career ==
Meyer is an expert on the history of science. After receiving his doctorate, he became an assistant professor of philosophy at Whitworth College in the fall of 1990. He was promoted to an associate professorship there in 1995, and was awarded tenure in 1996. In fall 2002, he moved to the position of professor, Conceptual Foundations of Science, at the Christian Palm Beach Atlantic University. He continued there up until spring 2005, then ceased teaching to devote his time to the intelligent design movement.

== Work ==
=== Creation science ===
As an undergraduate, Meyer had been "quite comfortable accepting the standard evolutionary story, although I put a bit of a theistic spin on it – that (evolution) is how God operated", but during his work with ARCO in Dallas, he was influenced by a conference: "I remember being especially fascinated with the origins debate at this conference. It impressed me to see that scientists who had always accepted the standard evolutionary story were now defending a theistic belief, not on the basis that it makes them feel good or provides some form of subjective contentment, but because the scientific evidence suggests an activity of mind that is beyond nature. I was really taken with this." Charles Thaxton organised the conference held in Dallas on 9–10 February 1985, featuring Antony Flew, and Dean H. Kenyon who spoke on "Going Beyond the Naturalistic Mindset: Origin of Life Studies".

Meyer became part of Thaxton's circle, and joined the debate with two articles published in March 1986: in one, he discussed The Mystery of Life's Origin which Thaxton had recently co-authored, commenting that the book had "done well to intimate that 'we are not alone.' Only revelation can now identify the Who that is with us." The other article discussed the 1981 McLean v. Arkansas and 1985 Aguillard v. Treen district court case rulings that teaching creation science in public schools was unconstitutional as creationism originated in religious conviction, and its reliance on "tenets of faith" implied it was not scientific. Meyer argued that modern scientific method equally relied on "foundational assumptions" based on faith in naturalism, which "assumed all events to be exclusively the result of physical or natural causes", so on the definition used in the court cases "science itself does not qualify as legitimate science". He proposed that "scientists and philosophers" could turn to Biblical presupposition to explain "the ultimate source of human reason, the existence of a real and uniformly ordered universe, and the ability present in a creative and ordered human intellect to know that universe. Both the Old and New Testaments define these relationships such that the presuppositional base necessary to modern science is not only explicable but also meaningful." Meyer's argument on epistemological presuppositions and accusation that evolution is based on an assumption of naturalism became central to the design movement.

At the University of Cambridge in England, he met theology student Mark Labberton. In the Fall of 1987 Labberton introduced Meyer to Phillip E. Johnson who was on a sabbatical at University College London, and having become "obsessed with evolution" had begun writing a book on what he saw as its problems. Meyer says "We walked around Cambridge kicking the pea gravel and talking over all the issues."

An article co-authored by Meyer and Thaxton published on 27 December 1987 asserted that "human rights depend upon the Creator who made man with dignity, not upon the state." They contrasted this with "purely material, scientific" ideas which equated humans to animals, and restated their central thesis that "Only if man is (in fact) a product of special Divine purposes can his claim to distinctive or intrinsic dignity be sustained." The terminology and concepts later featured in the Wedge strategy and theistic realism.

=== Intelligent design ===
After the 1987 Edwards v. Aguillard Supreme Court ruling affirmed the Aguillard v. Treen decision against teaching creation science, Thaxton as academic editor of Of Pandas and People adopted intelligent design wording. Meyer recalls the term coming up at a June 1988 conference in Tacoma organised by Thaxton, who "referred to a theory that the presence of DNA in a living cell is evidence of a designing intelligence." Phillip E. Johnson was drafting a book arguing against naturalism as the basis for evolutionary science, and Meyer brought a copy of the manuscript to the conference. He met Paul A. Nelson who found it exciting to read, and the two collaborated on a joint project. Needing a mathematician, they contacted Dembski in 1991. Thaxton has described Meyer as "kind of like" a Johnny Appleseed, bringing others into the movement.

Meyer became one of a group of prominent young intelligent design (ID) advocates with academic degrees: Mayer, Nelson, Dembski and Jonathan Wells. Meyer participated in the "Ad Hoc Origins Committee" defending Johnson's Darwin on Trial in 1992 or 1993 (in response to Stephen Jay Gould's review of it in the July 1992 issue of Scientific American), while with the Philosophy department at Whitworth College. He was later a participant in the first formal meeting devoted to ID, hosted at Southern Methodist University in 1992.

In December 1993, Bruce Chapman, president and founder of the Discovery Institute, noticed an essay in the Wall Street Journal by Meyer about a dispute when biology lecturer Dean H. Kenyon taught intelligent design in introductory classes. Kenyon had co-authored Of Pandas and People, and in 1993 Meyer had contributed to the teacher's notes for the second edition of Pandas. Meyer was an old friend of Discovery Institute co-founder George Gilder, and over dinner about a year later they formed the idea of a think tank opposed to materialism. In the summer of 1995 Chapman and Meyer met a representative of Howard Ahmanson, Jr. Meyer, who had previously tutored Ahmanson's son in science, recalls being asked "What could you do if you had some financial backing?" He was a co-author of the "Wedge strategy", which put forth the Discovery Institute's manifesto for the intelligent design movement.

In 1999, Meyer with David DeWolf and Mark DeForrest laid out a legal strategy for introducing intelligent design into public schools in their book Intelligent Design in Public School Science Curriculum. Meyer has co-edited Darwinism, Design, and Public Education (Michigan State University Press, 2000) with John Angus Campbell and co-edited Science and Evidence of Design in the Universe (Ignatius Press, 2000) with Michael J. Behe and William A. Dembski. In 2009, his book Signature in the Cell was released and in December of that year.

Meyer has been described as "the person who brought ID (intelligent design) to DI (Discovery Institute)" by historian Edward Larson, who was a fellow at the Discovery Institute prior to it becoming the center of the intelligent design movement. In 2004, the DI helped introduce ID to the Dover Area School District, which resulted in the Kitzmiller v. Dover Area School District case where ID was ruled to be based on religious beliefs rather than scientific evidence. Discussing ID in relation to Dover, on May 6, 2005, Meyer debated Eugenie Scott, on The Big Story with John Gibson. During the debate, Meyer argued that intelligent design is critical of more than just evolutionary mechanisms like natural selection that lead to diversification, but of common descent itself.

=== Films and debates ===
He has appeared on television and in public forums advocating intelligent design. Notably he wrote and appeared in the Discovery Institute's 2002 film Unlocking the Mystery of Life and was interviewed in the 2008 Expelled: No Intelligence Allowed movie. He has also been an active debater; in April 2006, he attended a debate with Peter Ward, a paleontologist from the University of Washington who held an open online discussion on the topic of intelligent design in the Talk of the Times forum in Seattle, WA. Meyer has also debated atheists Peter Atkins, Eugenie Scott and Michael Shermer.

=== "Teach the controversy" campaign ===
In March 2002, Meyer announced a "teach the controversy" strategy, advocating that evolution is primarily politically driven, rather than scientifically driven. The presentation included submission of an annotated bibliography of 44 peer-reviewed scientific articles that he claimed raise significant challenges to key tenets of "Darwinian evolution". In response to this claim, the National Center for Science Education (an organisation that works in collaboration with the National Academy of Sciences, the National Association of Biology Teachers, and the National Science Teachers Association to support the teaching of evolution in public schools) contacted the authors of the 44 papers listed, and 26 of them, representing 34 of the papers, responded. None of the authors considered that their research challenged any of the tenets of the theory of evolution. On March 11, 2002, during a panel discussion on evolution, Meyer falsely told the Ohio Board of Education that the Santorum Amendment was part of the No Child Left Behind Act and that the State of Ohio was therefore required to require the teaching of alternative theories of evolution as part of the biology curriculum. The professor of biology Kenneth R. Miller replied that comments and not approved amendments in conference committee reports do not carry the weight of law and that Meyer had misled the board of education in implying that they do.

=== Article in the Proceedings of the Biological Society of Washington ===
On 4 August 2004, an article by Meyer appeared in the peer-reviewed scientific journal Proceedings of the Biological Society of Washington. On September 7, the publisher of the journal, the Council of the Biological Society of Washington, released a statement retracting the article as not having met its scientific standards and saying that the article had been published at the discretion of former editor Richard Sternberg "without review by any associate editor". Critics believed that Sternberg's personal and ideological connections to Meyer suggest at least the appearance of a conflict of interest in his approval of Meyer's article.

The journal's reasons for disavowing the article were rebutted by Sternberg, who says the paper underwent the standard peer-review process and that he was encouraged to publish it by a member of the Council of the BSW.

A critical review of the article is available on the Panda's Thumb website. In January 2005, the Discovery Institute posted its response to the critique on their website.

The National Center for Science Education also called "the Meyer paper" pseudoscientific.

=== Claims of persecution ===
Meyer claims that those who oppose the essentially unanimous international scientific consensus on evolution are persecuted by the scientific community and prevented from publishing their views. In 2001, he signed the statement A Scientific Dissent from Darwinism, coinciding with the launch of the PBS TV series Evolution, saying in part:

The numbers of scientists who question Darwinism is a minority, but it is growing fast. This is happening in the face of fierce attempts to intimidate and suppress legitimate dissent. Young scientists are threatened with deprivation of tenure. Others have seen a consistent pattern of answering scientific arguments with ad hominem attacks. In particular, the series' attempt to stigmatize all critics – including scientists – as religious "creationists" is an excellent example of viewpoint discrimination.

== Selected publications ==
- DeForrest, ME; DeWolf, DK; Meyer S, C (1999). Intelligent Design in Public School Science Curriculum: A Legal Guidebook. Richardson, Tex: Foundation for Thought and Ethics. ISBN 978-0-9642104-1-7.
- Meyer, SC; Behe, MJ.; Lamantia, P; Dembski, WA (2000). Science and evidence for design in the universe: papers presented at a conference sponsored by the Wethersfield Institute, New York City, September 25, 1999. San Francisco: Ignatius Press. ISBN 978-0-89870-809-7.
- Meyer, SC; Campbell, JC (2003). Darwinism, design, and public education. East Lansing: Michigan State University Press. ISBN 978-0-87013-675-7.
- Meyer, SC (2009). Signature in the cell: DNA and the evidence for intelligent design. HarperOne. ISBN 978-0-06-147278-7.
- Meyer, SC (2013). Darwin's Doubt: The Explosive Origin of Animal Life and the Case for Intelligent Design. HarperOne. ISBN 978-0062071477.
- Meyer, SC (2021). Return of the God Hypothesis: Three Scientific Discoveries That Reveal the Mind Behind the Universe. HarperOne. ISBN 978-0062071507.

=== Signature in the Cell ===
On June 23, 2009, HarperOne released Meyer's Signature in the Cell: DNA and the Evidence for Intelligent Design.

In November 2009, the philosopher Thomas Nagel named Meyer's book as one of the "2009 Books of the Year" in a supplement for The Times. He wrote that the work "is a detailed account of the problem of how life came into existence from lifeless matter – something that had to happen before the process of biological evolution could begin ... Meyer is a Christian, but atheists, and theists who believe God never intervenes in the natural world, will be instructed by his careful presentation of this fiendishly difficult problem". Stephen Fletcher, a chemist at Loughborough University, responded in The Times Literary Supplement that Nagel was "promot[ing] the book to the rest of us using statements that are factually incorrect". Fletcher explained that "Natural selection is in fact a chemical process as well as a biological process, and it was operating for about half a billion years before the earliest cellular life forms appear in the fossil record". In another publication, Fletcher wrote: "I am afraid that reality has overtaken Meyer's book and its flawed reasoning", pointing out scientific problems with Meyer's work by citing how RNA "survived and evolved into our own human protein-making factory, and continues to make our fingers and toes."

Darrel Falk, former president of the BioLogos Foundation and a biology professor at Point Loma Nazarene University, wrote of the book in a review that, "If the object of the book is to show that the Intelligent Design movement is a scientific movement, it has not succeeded. In fact, what it has succeeded in showing is that it is a popular movement grounded primarily in the hopes and dreams of those in philosophy, in religion, and especially those in the general public."

=== Darwin's Doubt ===
On 18 June 2013, HarperOne released Darwin's Doubt: The Explosive Origin of Animal Life and the Case for Intelligent Design. In this book, Meyer proposed that the Cambrian explosion contradicts Darwin's evolutionary process and is best explained by intelligent design. It became a New York Times best seller.

In a June 2013 review in The Panda's Thumb, science blogger Nick Matzke described the book as having "misunderstandings, superficial treatment of key issues which are devastating to his thesis once understood, and complete or near-complete omission of information that any non-expert reader would need to have to make an accurate assessment of Meyer’s arguments". In a July 2013 article in The New Yorker, journalist Gareth Cook described Darwin's Doubt as "a masterwork of pseudoscience". In a review published in August 2013 by The Skeptics Society titled "Stephen Meyer's Fumbling Bumbling Amateur Cambrian Follies", paleontologist Donald Prothero described Darwin's Doubt as "riddled with errors of fact or interpretation that could result only from someone writing on a subject way over his head, abetted by the creationist tendency to pluck facts out of context and get their meanings completely backwards". In September 2013, paleontologist Charles R. Marshall wrote in Science that "Darwin's Doubt is compromised by Meyer's lack of scientific knowledge, his “god of the gaps” approach, and selective scholarship that appears driven by his deep belief in an explicit role of an intelligent designer in the history of life".

Paleontologist Mark McMenamin wrote in a review that "Meyer describes the dimensions of the problem with clarity and precision. His book is a game changer". Geneticist George Church described the book as "an opportunity for bridge-building rather than dismissive polarization—bridges across cultural divides in great need of professional, respectful dialogue—and bridges to span evolutionary gaps". In Spring 2019, computer scientist David Gelernter wrote in a review in the Claremont Review of Books that "Stephen Meyer’s thoughtful and meticulous Darwin’s Doubt (2013) convinced me that Darwin has failed".

== Sources ==
- Forrest, Barbara; Gross, Paul R. (2004). Creationism's Trojan horse: the wedge of intelligent design. Oxford [Oxfordshire]: Oxford University Press. ISBN 978-0-19-515742-0.
- Numbers, Ronald (November 30, 2006). The Creationists: From Scientific Creationism to Intelligent Design, Expanded Edition. Harvard University Press. ISBN 978-0-674-02339-0.
- Pennock, Robert T (3 August 2015). "DNA by design? Stephen Meyer and the return of the God hypothesis". Debating Design. (also pdf)
- Witham, Larry (2005). Where Darwin Meets the Bible: Creationists and Evolutionists in America. Oxford University Press. ISBN 9780195182811.
