= Unlocking the Mystery of Life =

Unlocking the Mystery of Life is a 2003 intelligent design documentary film promoted and produced by Illustra Media (linked to Discovery Media, successor to the Moody Bible Institute's "Moody Institute of Science") and Focus on the Family. The film's script was written by Stephen C. Meyer, who is director of the Center for Science and Culture at the Discovery Institute, and it includes fellows of the institute such as Jonathan Wells and Michael Behe arguing for intelligent design and against evolution.

It is promoted by Focus on the Family and Campus Crusade for Christ is providing a free copy to every school in Australia. In 2005, Albuquerque PBS member station KNME originally declined to air the film because "The funders of this program have a clear and specific agenda that they openly promote" and the station did not want to take sides. However, on May 22, 2005, the film aired on a commercial Albuquerque station, KOB-Channel 4. Illustra Media states that after the film's release in September 2003, more than 40 PBS affiliates had aired the documentary.

== See also ==
- Flock of Dodos. New Video, (2007) ISBN 0-7670-9819-6
