= David Klinghoffer =

American writer

David Klinghoffer (born 1965) is an Orthodox Jewish author and essayist, and a proponent of the pseudoscientific idea of intelligent design. He is a Senior Fellow of the Discovery Institute, the organization that is the driving force behind the intelligent design movement. He was a frequent contributor to National Review, and a former columnist for the Jewish weekly newspaper The Forward, to which he still contributes occasional essays.

== Education ==
Klinghoffer graduated magna cum laude from Brown University in 1987 with a Bachelor of Arts.

== Intelligent design ==
Klinghoffer has published a series of articles, editorial columns, and letters to the editor in both Jewish and non-Jewish conservative publications seeking to promote the pseudoscience of intelligent design and to discredit Darwinian views of evolution.

== Religion ==
Klinghoffer is an Orthodox Jew who has written a spiritual memoir about his religious background. He was raised in Reform Judaism by his adoptive parents, and formally converted to Orthodox Judaism, In his book, Why the Jews Rejected Jesus, Klinghoffer theorizes that Jewish rejection of Jesus allowed Christianity to separate from Judaism and become a multi-ethnic religion. Christianity was thus able to achieve a dominance in Gentile Europe that would have been impossible for Judaism to attain. To Klinghoffer, this changed world history, because Christianity was able to serve as a bulwark against the spread of Islam into Europe.

In May 2010, the Discovery Institute released a free 105-page eBook titled Signature of Controversy: Responses to Critics of Signature in the Cell, edited by Klinghoffer, with chapters by Discovery Institute fellows David Berlinski, Casey Luskin, Stephen C. Meyer, Paul Nelson, Jay Richards, and Richard Sternberg.

== Bibliography ==
- Klinghoffer, David (1998). The Lord Will Gather Me In: My Journey to Jewish Orthodoxy. Free Press. ISBN 0-7432-4267-X.
- Klinghoffer, David (2004). The Discovery of God: Abraham and the Birth of Monotheism. Random House. ISBN 978-0-385-49973-6.
- Klinghoffer, David (2006). Why the Jews Rejected Jesus: The Turning Point in Western History. Three Leaves. ISBN 978-0-385-51021-9.
- Klinghoffer, David (2007). Shattered Tablets: Why America Ignores the Ten Commandments at Its Peril. Doubleday. ISBN 978-0-385-51567-2.
- Klinghoffer, David (2008). How Would God Vote?: Why the Bible Commands You to Be a Conservative. Doubleday. ISBN 978-0-385-51542-9.
- Thaxton, Charles; Bradley, Walter; Olsen, Roger; Tour, James; Meyer, Stephen; Wells, Jonathan; Gonzalez, Guillermo; Miller, Brian; Klinghoffer, David (2020). The Mystery of Life's Origin. Discovery Institute. ISBN 978-193659975-2.
- Klinghoffer, David (2025). Plato's Revenge: The New Science of the Immaterial Genome. Discovery Institute. ISBN 978-163712074-3.

=== As editor ===
- Klinghoffer, David (2010). Signature of Controversy: Responses to Critics of Signature in the Cell. Discovery Institute Press. ISBN 978-0-7432-4267-7. Internet Archive link.
- Klinghoffer, David, ed. (2018). Debating Darwin's Doubt: A Scientific Controversy That Can No Longer Be Denied. Discovery Institute Press. ISBN 978-1936599288. [
