= Geoffrey Simmons =

American physician

Geoffrey Simmons (born 28 July 1943) is a medical doctor, science fiction author and proponent of intelligent design from Eugene, Oregon. He was a doctor of internal medicine for the PeaceHealth Medical Group in Eugene, boarded in internal medicine and disaster medicine. Wen Hsing Simmons retired at the end of 2015.

== Biography ==
Simmons was born in Fort Gordon, Georgia, in 1943. He has a B.S. in biology from the University of Illinois and earned an M.D. from the University of Illinois Medical School in 1969.

Simmons is a fellow at the Center for Science and Culture, part of the Discovery Institute. He toured with PSSI in Spain with the Spanish version of What Darwin Didn't Know, to five cities: Barcelona, Málaga, Madrid, León and Vigo, nine lectures altogether. He has lectured at college campuses, churches and synagogues. Simmons also teaches disaster preparedness locally, regionally and nationally. He is a Governor on the Board of Governors for the American Academy of Disaster Medicine and an Advisor to FEMA on the Advisory Council for FEMA Region X. He is a CERT trainer and volunteer CERT Coordinator for the City of Eugene. He has lectured at the IAEM and NASA. His newest book Common Sense and Disaster Preparedness will be published by the Journal of Emergency Management (JEM), Fall 2010.

== Intelligent design ==
Simmons has written nine books, four fiction, two medical spoofs, and two books about the creation–evolution controversy, published by a Christian publishing house and promotes the pseudoscience of intelligent design. In 2008, he debated evolutionary biologist PZ Myers, among many professors, on KKMS radio. He has done other radio interviews, such as on Coast to Coast AM in 2007

== Works ==
- The Glue Factory. (Beckett Publishing Company, November 1, 1995) (Illustrated by Ray Broderick) ISBN 1-4392-3053-6
- What Darwin Didn't Know: A Doctor Dissects the Theory of Evolution . (Harvest Publishers, January 1, 2004) (Foreword by William Dembski) ISBN 0-7369-1313-0
- Billions of Missing Links: A Rational Look at the Mysteries Evolution Can't Explain. (Harvest House Publishers, February 15, 2007) ISBN 0-7369-1746-2
- Common Sense and Disaster Preparedness, Journal of Emergency Management, Fall 2010

=== Fiction ===
- The Z Papers, Arbor House and Bantam, 1970s
- The Adam Experiment, Arbor House and Berkley, 1970s
- Pandemic, Arbor House and Berkley, 1980s.
- MURDOCK, Arbor House, 1980s
- The Glue Factory factor, Beckett, 1990s
- To Glue or Not To Glue. Beckett, 1990s
