= Siegfried Scherer =

Siegfried Scherer (born 7 April 1955, Oberndorf am Neckar) is a German biologist, since 1991 Professor of Microbiology at the Technical University of Munich, Weihenstephan since 1991, where he is Managing Director of the Nutrition and Food Research Center ZIEL. Scherer is not a prominent creationist as often purported. He believes that religion and science are two different ways of approaching reality. He is married to anthropologist Sigrid Hartwig-Scherer.

== Biography ==
Scherer studied biology, chemistry and physics at the University of Konstanz. In 1977, he passed the state examination in chemistry and physics, and in 1980, the diploma and state examination in biology. In 1983, he earned his PhD in plant physiology. From 1983 to 1988, he researched plant physiology and biochemistry at the University of Konstanz. In 1984, he received the Byk company's research award, and in 1986, he April assumed a research position for field studies at China and Mongolia with the Chinese Academy of Science. From 1988 to 1989, he was on a research scholarship from German Academic Exchange Service at the Virginia Tech Department of Biochemistry.

After this, Scherer had a post-doctoral position at the University of Konstanz from 1989 to 1991. That year, he was on habilitation at University of Konstanz in plant physiology and microbial ecology, then became Professor extraordinarius at the Technical University of Munich, a Director of the Microbiology Department at the Research Center for Milk and Food, Weihenstephan. In 1997, he became Managing Director of the Research Center for Milk and Food. In 2002, he accepted an invitation for a chair at the University of Veterinary Medicine Vienna, and next year, he became to the chair of microbial ecology at the Nutrition and Food Research Center ZIEL. 2003 ordained Managing Director of the ZIEL.

Scherer is researching on pathogens in food by use of genetic engineering. His team developed a method for early detection of microorganisms causing food deterioration and therefore received the 2005 Award of the German Federation of Industrial Research Associations "Otto von Guericke". Other research interests are taxonomy and evolution. Scherer authored numerous publications on plant physiology and microbiology.

Scherer is one of the most prominent German critics of evolutionary theory. Until 2006, he presided at the Studiengemeinschaft Wort und Wissen, an evangelical association of German creationists and critics of evolutionary theory. Together with Reinhard Junker he authored the textbook Evolution – ein kritisches Lehrbuch, which presents evolution theory from a creationist perspective. Until 2003, Scherer was Fellow of the Discovery Institute. He criticizes the institute's current activities towards implementing intelligent design in school science curricula by legal means.
