= Santorum Amendment =

Failed amendment to US 2001 education bill

The Santorum Amendment was a failed proposed amendment to the 2001 education funding bill (which became known as the No Child Left Behind Act) that promoted the teaching of intelligent design while questioning the academic standing of evolution in US public schools. The amendment was proposed by Republican Rick Santorum, then a United States senator for Pennsylvania. In response, a coalition of 96 scientific and educational organizations wrote a letter to the conference committee, urging that the amendment be stricken from the final bill and arguing that evolution is regarded as fact in the scientific fields and that the amendment creates the misperception of evolution not being fully accepted in the scientific community and thus weakening science education. The words of the amendment survive in modified form in the bill's conference committee report but do not carry the weight of law. As one of the Discovery Institute intelligent design campaigns it became a cornerstone in the intelligent design movement's "teach the controversy" campaign.

== History ==
The origin of the amendment can be traced back to 2000, when leading intelligent design (ID) proponents through the Discovery Institute, a conservative Christian think tank that is the hub of the intelligent design movement, held a congressional briefing in Washington, D.C., to promote their agenda to lawmakers. Sen. Rick Santorum was one of intelligent design's most vocal supporters on Capitol Hill.

One result of this briefing was that in 2001 Senator Santorum proposed incorporating pro-intelligent design language, crafted in part by the Discovery Institute's Center for Science and Culture, into the No Child Left Behind bill. It portrayed evolution as generating "much continuing controversy" and not widely accepted, using the Discovery Institute's Teach the Controversy method.

In proposing the amendment, Santorum addressed the Congress:

This is an amendment that is a sense of the Senate. It is a sense of the Senate that deals with the subject of intellectual freedom with respect to the teaching of science in the classroom, in primary and secondary education. It is a sense of the Senate that does not try to dictate curriculum to anybody; quite the contrary, it says there should be freedom to discuss and air good scientific debate within the classroom. In fact, students will do better and will learn more if there is this intellectual freedom to discuss. I will read this sense of the Senate. It is simply two sentences—frankly, two rather innocuous sentences—that hopefully this Senate will embrace: "It is the sense of the Senate that—

(1) good science education should prepare students to distinguish the data or testable theories of science from philosophical or religious claims that are made in the name of science; and
(2) where biological evolution is taught, the curriculum should help students to understand why this subject generates so much continuing controversy, and should prepare the students to be informed participants in public discussions regarding the subject.

It simply says there are disagreements in scientific theories out there that are continually tested. Our knowledge of science is not absolute, obviously. We continue to test theories. Over the centuries there were theories that were once presumed to be true and have been proven, through further revelation of scientific investigation and testing, to be not true.

Santorum then went on to quote David DeWolf, a senior fellow of the Discovery Institute's Center for Science and Culture, as how the Institute's agenda was justified and would benefit students.

Phillip E. Johnson, retired UC Berkeley law professor, leading proponent of intelligent design, founding advisor of the Discovery Institute's Center for Science and Culture, and "father" of the intelligent design movement, assisted Santorum in phrasing the amendment. Johnson says that he is the author of the original amendment.

On June 14, 2001, the amendment was passed as part of the education funding bill by the Senate on a vote of 91-8. This was hailed as a major victory by proponents of intelligent design and other creationists; for instance an email newsletter by the Discovery Institute contained the sentence "Undoubtedly this will change the face of the debate over the theories of evolution and intelligent design in America ... It also seems that the Darwinian monopoly on public science education, and perhaps the biological sciences in general, is ending." Senator Sam Brownback of Kansas cited the amendment as vindicating the 1999 Kansas school board decision (since overturned) to eliminate evolution questions from state tests.

The House version of the bill H.R. 1 did not contain the amendment, which meant that a conference committee had to decide its ultimate fate.

Scientists and educators feared that by singling out biological evolution as very controversial, the amendment could create the impression that a substantial scientific controversy about evolution exists, leading to a lessening of academic rigor in science curricula. A coalition of 96 scientific and educational organizations signed a letter to this effect to the conference committee, urging that the amendment be stricken from the final bill, which it was, but intelligent design supporters on the conference committee preserved it in the bill's legislative history.

While the amendment did not become law, a version of it appears in the Conference Report as an explanatory text about the legislative history and purposes of the bill. However, it has no legal force per se. The final text of the Santorum Amendment as included in the Conference Report reads:

"The Conferees recognize that a quality science education should prepare students to distinguish the data and testable theories of science from religious or philosophical claims that are made in the name of science. Where topics are taught that may generate controversy (such as biological evolution), the curriculum should help students to understand the full range of scientific views that exist, why such topics may generate controversy, and how scientific discoveries can profoundly affect society."

Despite the amendment lacking the weight of law, the conference report is constantly cited by the Discovery Institute and other ID supporters as providing federal sanction for intelligent design. In response to criticisms of the Institute stating that the amendment was a federal education policy requiring inclusion of alternatives to evolution be taught, which it was not, in 2003 intelligent design's three most prominent legislators, John Boehner, Judd Gregg and Santorum provided a letter to the Discovery Institute giving it the go ahead to invoke the amendment as evidence of "Congress's rejection of the idea that students only need to learn about the dominant scientific view of controversial topics". This letter was also sent to executives on the Ohio Board of Education and the Texas Board of Education, both of which were subject to Discovery Institute intelligent design campaigns at the time.

== Scientific community's response ==
The position of scientists and science educators has been that although evolution has generated a great deal of political and philosophical debate it is, in the scientific fields, regarded as fact. They said that the amendment creates a misperception that evolution is not fully accepted in the scientific community, and thus weakens science curricula. As a response, a coalition of 96 scientific and educational organizations wrote a letter to the conference committee, urging that the amendment be stricken from the final bill.

In addition, opponents of the amendment cite the stated agenda of the Discovery Institute's Phillip Johnson use of the "Wedge strategy" to "affirm the reality of God by challenging the domination of materialism and naturalism in the world of the mind" and thereby return Christian creationism in the guise of intelligent design to public school classrooms. Along with the Academic Bill of Rights, the Santorum Amendment and its "Teach the Controversy" approach is viewed by some academics as a threat to academic freedom.

== See also ==
- Intelligent design in politics
- Natural science
