= Theistic science =

Theistic science, also referred to as theistic realism, is the proposal that the central scientific method of requiring testability, known as methodological naturalism, should be replaced by a philosophy of science that allows occasional supernatural explanations which are inherently untestable. Proponents propose supernatural explanations for topics raised by their theology, in particular evolution. Supporters of theistic realism or theistic science include intelligent design creationism proponents J. P. Moreland, Stephen C. Meyer and Phillip E. Johnson.

Instead of the relationship between religion and science being a dialogue, theistic science seeks to allow exceptions to the basic methods of science, and present miraculous interventions as a scientific explanation when a natural explanation has not been found. As Notre Dame theologian Alvin Plantinga acknowledges, this is a "science stopper", and these concepts lack any mainstream credence.

== Johnson ==
In 1987 the United States Supreme Court ruled in Edwards v. Aguillard that a Louisiana law requiring that creation science be taught in public school science classes, along with evolution, was unconstitutional because the law was specifically intended to advance a particular religion. Academic UC Berkeley law professor Phillip E. Johnson, a prominent supporter of the law, became convinced that creationists had lost the case because the methodological naturalism used by the scientific community in defining science does not include supernatural processes, and therefore (unfairly, in his opinion) excluded creationism. He concluded that creationists must therefore redefine science to restore the supernatural, and developed the wedge strategy. The intelligent design movement began with the publication of Of Pandas and People in 1989, and Johnson later became its de facto leader.

In his 1995 book Reason in the Balance: The Case Against Naturalism in Science, Law and Education, Johnson labelled his position theistic realism which, in contrast to methodological naturalism, assumed "that the universe and all its creatures were brought into existence for a purpose by God. Theistic realists expect this 'fact' of creation to have empirical, observable consequences that are different from the consequences one would observe if the universe were the product of non rational causes". While "God always has the option of working through regular secondary mechanisms" which were often to be seen, "many important questions—including the origin of genetic information and human consciousness—may not be explicable in terms of unintelligent causes".

In an essay written in 1996, Johnson wrote of the intelligent design movement that "My colleagues and I speak of 'theistic realism' — or sometimes, 'mere creation' — as the defining concept of our movement. This means that we affirm that God is objectively real as Creator, and that the reality of God is tangibly recorded in evidence accessible to science, particularly in biology." Johnson presents theistic realism as a philosophical justification for intelligent design in his book, Reason in the Balance. According to Johnson, true knowledge begins with the acknowledgment of God as creator of the universe, the unifying characteristic of which is that it was created by God. Theistic realism relies on a concept of God which involves the notions that He is real, personal, and acting in the world through mechanistic creationism.

The Wedge Document of 1999 states "Design theory promises to reverse the stifling dominance of the materialist world view, and to replace it with a science consonant with Christian and theistic convictions."

== Moreland ==
Moreland describes theistic science as a research program that is "rooted in the idea that Christians ought to consult all they know or have reason to believe in forming and testing hypotheses, explaining things in science and evaluating the plausibility of various hypotheses, and among the things they should consult are propositions of theology (and philosophy)", and defines its two central propositions as:

1. "God, conceived of as a personal, transcendent agent of great power and intelligence, has through direct, primary agent causation and indirect, Secondary Causation created and designed the world for a purpose and has directly intervened in the course of its development at various times (including prehistory, history prior to the arrival of human beings)," and
2. "The commitment expressed in proposition 1 can appropriately enter into the very fabric of the practice of science and the utilization of scientific methodology"

He recommends that the way science is practised should be fundamentally altered to make God's intervention an acceptable scientific explanation, but would not apply this in all areas, as "theologians have little interest in whether a methane molecule has three or four hydrogen atoms". He would see miraculous intervention being needed as God "designed the world for a purpose", and "has directly intervened in the course of its development at various points" which would include "directly creating the universe, first life, the basic kinds of life, and humans".

== Plantinga ==
In a 1991 paper, Plantinga identifies theistic science with creation science:

'Unnatural Science', 'Creation Science,' 'Theistic Science' — call it what you will: what we need when we want to know how to think about the origin and development of contemporary life is what is most plausible from a Christian point of view. What we need is a scientific account of life that isn't restricted by that methodological naturalism.

He suggests that generally God uses secondary causes, but miracles may be needed when theistic scientists are unable to find a materialistic explanation. In 1997 he wrote "Why couldn't a scientist think as follows? God has created the world, and of course He created everything in it directly or indirectly. After a great deal of study, we can't see how he created some phenomenon P (life, for example) indirectly; thus probably he has created it directly."

Plantinga also refers to this concept as Augustinian science, and states that "in doing Augustinian science, you start by assuming the deliverances of the faith, employing them along with anything else you know in dealing with a given scientific problem or project." Plantinga argues for the acceptance of differing worldview-partisan sciences in place of a single common science.

Plantinga employs a conflict thesis in assessing the relationship between religion and science. These views have been criticised by Christian physicist Howard J. Van Till, who rejects the conflict thesis, for relying on "folk exegesis" in his assessment of the bible's teachings on creation. Van Till argues that the problem is not evolution, but its misuse for "naturalistic apologetics".

Philosopher and Roman Catholic priest Ernan McMullin also disagrees with Plantinga's call for a theistic science, stating that it should not be considered to be science at all, and suggesting that Plantinga seriously understates the evidential support for evolution. Plantinga only disagrees with naturalism, not with evolution.

Some contemporary philosophers, such as Roy Clouser, argue that neutrality in science is impossible and that all sciences rest on specific religious or naturalistic assumptions.

== Others ==
Similar ideas have been expressed by George M. Marsden and Mehdi Golshani (the latter referring to it as 'Islamic science').
