= Rob Boston =

American activist (born 1962)

Robert Boston
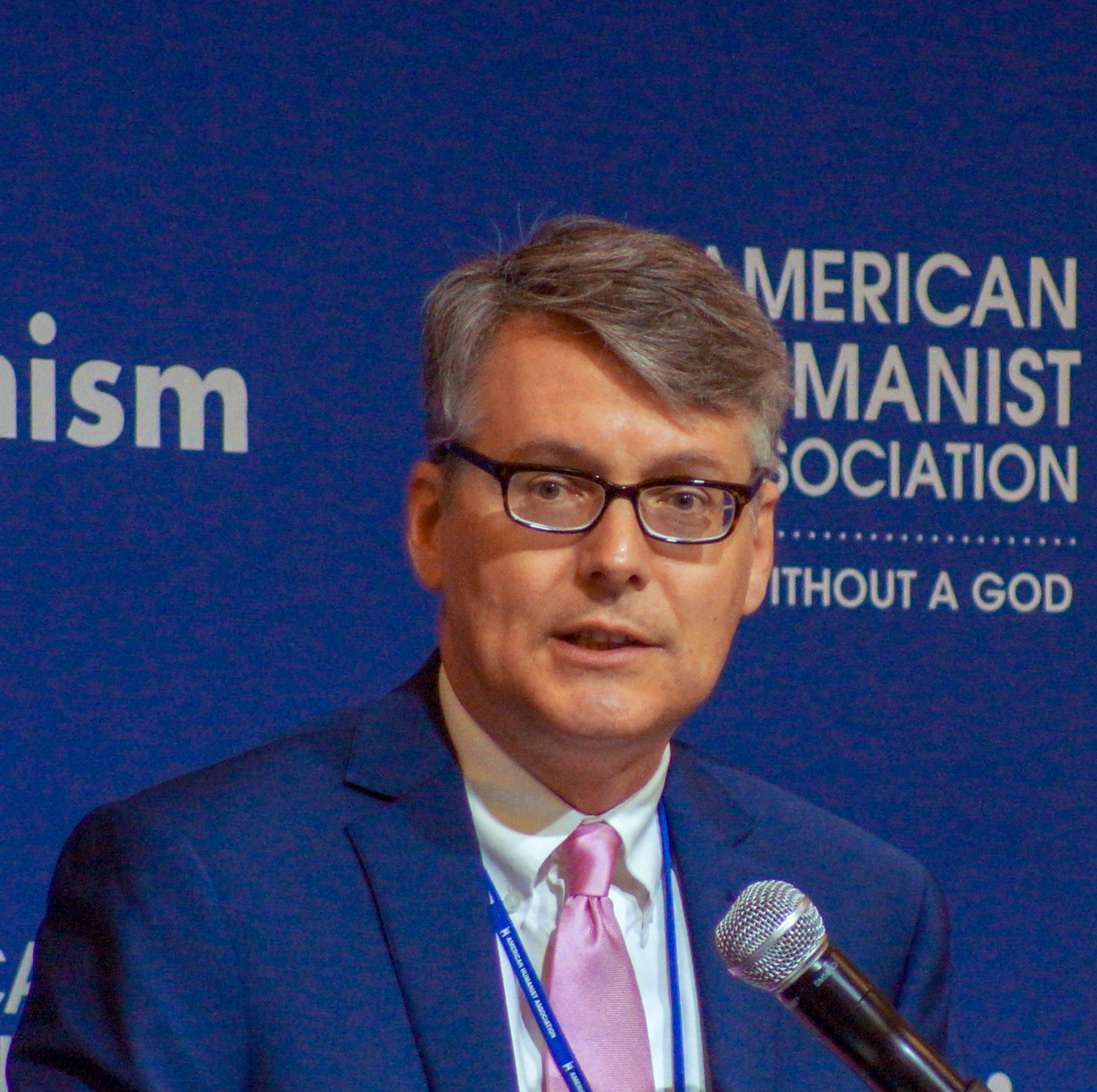
- Rob Boston in 2018
- Born: December 7, 1962 (age 62); Altoona, Pennsylvania, U.S.

Robert Boston (born December 7, 1962) is Senior Adviser for Americans United for Separation of Church and State and Editor of Church & State magazine. He has worked at Americans United since 1987, and formerly served as Assistant Director of Communications and Assistant Editor of Church & State as well as Director of Communications. Boston is an advocate of separation of church and state and has authored four books on the subject. He frequently appears on television and radio. Prominent media appearances include CNN, NBC Nightly News, Fox News Channel's The O'Reilly Factor and MSNBC's Countdown with Keith Olbermann.

In addition to his monthly contributions to Church & State magazine, Boston has written articles for Free Inquiry, The Humanist, Public Eye, Liberty, Jewish Monthly and other publications. He is frequently quoted in the print media on church-state topics, and often delivers public lectures before various audiences. Boston serves on the Advisory Board of Secular Coalition for America and offers advice to the coalition on the acceptance and inclusion of nontheism in American life. He also serves on the Board of Directors of the American Humanist Association.

== Bibliography ==
- Why the Religious Right Is Wrong About Separation of Church & State (Prometheus Books, 1993), revised second edition (Prometheus Books, 2003) ISBN 1-59102-114-6
- The Most Dangerous Man in America? Pat Robertson and the Rise of the Christian Coalition (Prometheus Books, 1996) ISBN 1-57392-053-3
- Close Encounters with the Religious Right: Journeys Into the Twilight Zone of Religion and Politics (Prometheus Books, 2000) ISBN 1-57392-797-X
- Taking Liberties: Why Religious Freedom Doesn't Give You The Right To Tell Other People What To Do (Prometheus Books, 2014) ISBN 978-1-61614-911-6
