= Phillip E. Johnson =

American legal scholar (1940–2019)

- Born: June 18, 1940; Aurora, Illinois, U.S.
- Died: November 2, 2019 (aged 79); Berkeley, California, U.S.
- Education: Harvard University (BA); University of Chicago (JD)
- Occupations: Law professor; author
- Known for: Advocacy of intelligent design
- Notable work: Darwin on Trial (1991)
- Title: Jefferson E. Peyser Professor of Law

Phillip E. Johnson (June 18, 1940 – November 2, 2019) was an American legal scholar and authority on criminal law who was the Jefferson E. Peyser Professor of Law at the University of California, Berkeley. He co-founded the Center for Science and Culture (CSC) at the Discovery Institute and was one of the leaders of the intelligent design movement, along with William Dembski and Michael Behe. Johnson described himself as "in a sense the father of the intelligent design movement".

Johnson was an opponent of "fully naturalistic evolution, involving chance mechanisms and natural selection". Johnson argued that scientists accepted the theory of evolution "before it was rigorously tested, and thereafter used all their authority to convince the public that naturalistic processes are sufficient to produce a human from a bacterium, and a bacterium from a mix of chemicals."

== Early life and education ==
Johnson was born in Aurora, Illinois, on June 18, 1940. He graduated from West Aurora High School in 1958. During high school, he was accepted to attend Harvard University while still a junior, and enrolled at Harvard at age 16. He graduated from Harvard College with a Bachelor of Arts in English literature in 1961 and became a teacher in rural Kenya afterwards. Johnson then studied law at the University of Chicago and graduated first in his class from the University of Chicago Law School with a Juris Doctor (J.D.) in 1965. As a law student, Johnson was an editor of the University of Chicago Law Review. Throughout college, he was agnostic.

After law school, Johnson served as a law clerk for Chief Justice Roger J. Traynor at the California Supreme Court from 1965 to 1966, then clerked for Chief Justice Earl Warren at the Supreme Court of the United States from 1966 to 1967. He was admitted to the State Bar of California on January 11, 1966.

== Academic career ==
Upon finishing his clerkship at the U.S. Supreme Court, Johnson was offered a professorship at Yale Law School, but declined. Instead, he joined the faculty at the University of California, Berkeley, School of Law, as he recalled the professors there as "more like me—public school types". From 1967 to 2000, Johnson was an active professor of law at the UC Berkeley School of Law and retained the title of professor emeritus at the time of his death. Johnson served as deputy district attorney and held visiting professorships at Emory University and at University College London.

== Views ==
At the age of 38, Johnson became a born again Christian following a divorce, and later became an elder in the Presbyterian Church (USA). Johnson recounted that while on a sabbatical in England he sought, through prayer, inspiration for what he should do with the rest of his life, and then received an epiphany after he read Richard Dawkins' The Blind Watchmaker (1986) and Michael Denton's Evolution: A Theory in Crisis (1985). Johnson later said, "Something about the Darwinists' rhetorical style made me think they had something to hide." Despite having no formal background in biology, he felt that he could add insight into the premises and arguments. Johnson stated that he approached the creation evolution dispute not as a scientist but as an academic lawyer by profession, with a specialty in analyzing the logic of arguments and identifying the assumptions that lie behind those arguments. He noted that what people think about evolutionism depends very heavily on the kind of logic they employ and the kind of assumptions they make. Further, he pointed out that four of the eleven members of the special committee appointed by the National Academy of Sciences to prepare its official booklet titled Science and Creationism were lawyers. (That first edition of the publication, which was finished in 1984, was prepared as an amicus brief in the Edwards v. Aguillard case that went before the U.S. Supreme Court.) In 1989, Of Pandas and People by Percival Davis and Dean H. Kenyon was published as the first book to promote intelligent design.

The first edition of Darwin on Trial was published in 1991. In notes listing his sources, Johnson said about Of Pandas and People that "This book is 'creationist' only in the sense that it juxtaposes a paradigm of 'intelligent design' with the dominant paradigm of (naturalistic) evolution, and makes the case for the former. It does not rely on the authority of the Bible." Following that, Johnson sought supporters for his "Wedge Strategy". In the ID blog Evolution News, Casey Luskin described him as the godfather of the intelligent design movement, and PBS said he was "known as the father of intelligent design".

Johnson was a critic of methodological naturalism, the basic principle that science can only investigate natural causes for observable phenomena, and espoused a philosophy he called "theistic realism." He was the author of several books on intelligent design, science, philosophy, and religion, as well as textbooks on criminal law. He has appeared on various programs such as PBS's Firing Line and a Nova episode, "Judgment Day: Intelligent Design on Trial."

== Intelligent design ==
Johnson was known as one of the founders of the intelligent design movement, principal architect of the wedge strategy, and the author of the Santorum Amendment.

Johnson rejects common descent and does not take a position on the age of the Earth. These concepts are a common theme in his books, including Darwin on Trial, Reason in the Balance: The Case Against Naturalism in Science, Law & Education (1995), Defeating Darwinism by Opening Minds (1997), and The Wedge of Truth: Splitting the Foundations of Naturalism (2000). Eugenie Scott wrote that Darwin on Trial "teaches little that is accurate about either the nature of science, or the topic of evolution. It is recommended neither by scientists nor educators." Working through the Center for Science and Culture, Johnson wrote the early draft language of the Santorum Amendment, which encouraged a "Teach the Controversy" approach to evolution in public school education.

Nancy Pearcey, a Center for Science and Culture fellow and Johnson associate, credits Johnson's leadership of the intelligent design movement in two of her most recent publications. In an interview with Johnson for World magazine, Pearcey says, "It is not only in politics that leaders forge movements. Phillip Johnson has developed what is called the 'Intelligent Design' movement ..." In Christianity Today, she reveals Johnson's religious beliefs and his criticism of evolution and affirms Johnson as "The unofficial spokesman for ID" The scientific community views intelligent design as pseudoscience and junk science.

=== Darwin on Trial ===
In the book Darwin on Trial, 1991, Johnson disputed the tenets of evolution and promoted intelligent design. He wrote the book with the thesis that evolution could be "tried" like a defendant in court. Darwin on Trial became a central text of the intelligent design movement.

=== Wedge strategy ===
In its earliest days the intelligent design movement was called the 'wedge movement'. The wedge metaphor, attributed to Johnson, is that of a metal wedge splitting a log and represents using an aggressive public relations program to create an opening for the supernatural in the public's understanding of science. Johnson acknowledges that the goal of the intelligent design movement is to promote a theistic agenda as a scientific concept.

According to Johnson, the wedge movement, if not the term, began in 1992:

The movement we now call the wedge made its public debut at a conference of scientists and philosophers held at Southern Methodist University in March 1992, following the publication of my book Darwin on Trial. The conference brought together as speakers some key Wedge figures, particularly Michael Behe, Stephen Meyer, William Dembski, and myself.

Rob Boston of Americans United for Separation of Church and State described the wedge strategy:

The objective [of the wedge strategy] is to convince people that Darwinism is inherently atheistic, thus shifting the debate from creationism vs. evolution to the existence of God vs. the non-existence of God. From there people are introduced to 'the truth' of the Bible and then 'the question of sin' and finally 'introduced to Jesus.'

Johnson is one of the authors of the Discovery Institute's Wedge Document and its "Teach the Controversy" campaign, which attempts to cast doubt on the validity of the theory of evolution, its acceptance within the scientific community, and reduce its role in public school science curricula while promoting intelligent design. The "Teach the Controversy" campaign portrays evolution as "a theory in crisis."

In his 1997 book Defeating Darwinism by Opening Minds Johnson summed up the underlying philosophy of his advocacy for intelligent design and against methodological and philosophical naturalism:

If we understand our own times, we will know that we should affirm the reality of God by challenging the domination of materialism and naturalism in the world of the mind. With the assistance of many friends I have developed a strategy for doing this, ... We call our strategy the "wedge".

Johnson has described the wedge strategy as:

- "We are taking an intuition most people have [the belief in God] and making it a scientific and academic enterprise. We are removing the most important cultural roadblock to accepting the role of God as creator."
- "Our strategy has been to change the subject a bit, so that we can get the issue of intelligent design, which really means the reality of God, before the academic world and into the schools."
- "This isn't really, and never has been, a debate about science. It's about religion and philosophy."
- "So the question is: 'How to win?' That's when I began to develop what you now see full-fledged in the 'wedge' strategy: 'Stick with the most important thing' —the mechanism and the building up of information. Get the Bible and the Book of Genesis out of the debate because you do not want to raise the so-called Bible-science dichotomy. Phrase the argument in such a way that you can get it heard in the secular academy and in a way that tends to unify the religious dissenters. That means concentrating on, 'Do you need a Creator to do the creating, or can nature do it on its own?' and refusing to get sidetracked onto other issues, which people are always trying to do."

When asked how best to raise doubts and question evolution with non-believers, Johnson responded:

What I am not doing is bringing the Bible into the university and saying, "We should believe this." Bringing the Bible into question works very well when you are talking to a Bible-believing audience. But it is a disastrous thing to do when you are talking, as I am constantly, to a world of people for whom the fact that something is in the Bible is a reason for not believing it. You see, if they thought they had good evidence for something, and then they saw it in the Bible, they would begin to doubt. That is what has to be kept out of the argument if you are going to do what I to do, which is to focus on the defects in their [the evolutionist's] case—the bad logic, the bad science, the bad reasoning, and the bad evidence.

=== Wedge of Truth ===
The book Wedge of Truth, published by Johnson in 2000, is an expansion of the Wedge Document. He states that truth has the ability to speak for itself.

=== Criticism ===
Johnson has been accused of being intellectually dishonest in his arguments advancing intelligent design and attacking the scientific community. Johnson has employed numerous equivocations regarding the term "naturalism," failing to distinguish between methodological naturalism (in which science is used to study the natural world and says nothing about the supernatural) versus philosophical naturalism (the philosophical belief that nothing exists but the natural world, and adopts as a premise the idea that there is no supernatural world or deities). In fact-checking Johnson's books Darwin on Trial and Defeating Darwinism by Opening Minds, Brian Spitzer, an associate professor of biology at the University of Redlands, argued that almost every scientific source Johnson cited had been misused or distorted, from simple misinterpretations and innuendos to outright fabrications. Spitzer described Darwin on Trial as the most deceptive book he had ever read.

In 1993 the ASA's Perspectives on Science and Christian Faith published a review of Darwin on Trial by Nancey Murphy, an associate professor of Christian philosophy at Fuller Theological Seminary, who described Johnson's arguments as "dogmatic and unconvincing", primarily because "he does not adequately understand scientific reasoning." In a later interview she said she faced a campaign to get her fired after she expressed her view that intelligent design was not only poor theology, but "so stupid, I don't want to give them my time." Murphy, who accepts the validity of evolution, said that Johnson called a trustee in an attempt to get her fired and stated "His tactic has always been to fight dirty when anyone attacks his ideas." Johnson admits he had spoken with a former trustee of the seminary who was himself upset with Murphy, but denies any responsibility for action taken against her. He said: "It's the Darwinists who hold the power in academia and who threaten the professional status and livelihoods of anyone who disagrees ... They feel to teach anything but their orthodoxy is an act of professional treason."

Since Johnson is considered by those both inside and outside the movement to be the father and architect of the intelligent design movement and its strategies, his statements are often used to validate the criticisms leveled by those who allege that the Discovery Institute and its allied organizations are merely stripping the obvious religious content from their anti-evolution assertions as a means of avoiding the legal restrictions of the Establishment Clause, a view reinforced by the December 2005 ruling in the Kitzmiller v. Dover Area School District trial which found that intelligent design is not science and is essentially religious in nature. They argue that ID is an attempt to put a patina of secularity on top of what is a fundamentally religious belief and thus that the "Teach the Controversy" exhortation is disingenuous, particularly when contrasted to his statements in The Wall Street Journal and other secular media. Critics point out that contrary to the Discovery Institute's and Johnson's claims, the theory of evolution is well-supported and accepted within the scientific community, with debates regarding how evolution occurred, not if it occurred. Popular disagreement with evolutionary theory should not be considered as a reason for challenging it as a scientifically valid subject to be taught, they contend.

Critics of Johnson point to his central role in the Discovery Institute's carefully orchestrated campaign known as the wedge strategy. The wedge strategy, as envisioned by the Discovery Institute, is designed to leave the science establishment looking close-minded in the short term with a long-term goal being a redefinition of science that centers on the removal of methodological naturalism from the philosophy of science and the scientific method, thereby allowing for supernatural explanations to be introduced as science. Critics note that Johnson, as a principal officer of the Discovery Institute, often cites an overall plan to put the United States on a course toward the theocracy envisioned in the wedge strategy, and that the Discovery Institute as a matter of policy intentionally obfuscates its agenda. According to Johnson, "The movement we now call the wedge made its public debut at a conference of scientists and philosophers held at Southern Methodist University in March 1992."

During the 1990s, Johnson and several others challenged the scientific consensus by claiming that HIV tests do not detect HIV, AIDS statistics are grossly exaggerated, and that HIV is not the cause of AIDS. As a member of The Group for the Scientific Reappraisal of the HIV/AIDS Hypothesis, a prominent AIDS denialist group, Johnson questioned if HIV caused AIDS. He wrote several articles about the subject, including a piece in Reason magazine. He was one of the 12 founding members of The Group for the Scientific Reappraisal of the HIV/AIDS Hypothesis and signatory to the group's letter to the editor of Science asserting that HIV is only tautologically associated with AIDS and that HIV tests are inaccurate. Johnson, along with others, have been criticized for their questioning of the scientific and medical consensus that HIV causes AIDS. In the Washington University Law Review, Matthew J. Brauer, Barbara Forrest, and Steven G. Gey faulted Johnson, Wells and others for denying the HIV/AIDS connection and promoting denialism via a petition designed to garner publicity but which did not have any scientific support.

== Personal life and death ==
Johnson had two children and lived with his wife in Berkeley, California. In 2004, he was awarded the inaugural "Phillip E. Johnson Award for Liberty and Truth" by Biola University, a private evangelical Christian college noted for its promotion of intelligent design.

Johnson died on November 2, 2019, at his home.

== Selected works ==
=== Criminal law ===
- Johnson, Phillip E. (1975). The Elements of Criminal Due Process: Cases, Materials, and Text. Criminal Justice Series. St. Paul, MN: West Pub Co. LCCN 75026046. OCLC 1914558.
- ——— (1975). Criminal Law: Cases, Materials, and Text on the Substantive Criminal Law in its Procedural Context. American Casebook Series. St. Paul, MN: West Pub Co. LCCN 75005083. OCLC 1529179.
- —— (1976). 1976 Supplement to Criminal Law: Cases, Materials, and Text on the Substantive Criminal Law in its Procedural Context. American Casebook Series. St. Paul, MN: West Pub. LCCN 77354635. OCLC 2607013.
- ——— (1977). 1977 Supplement to Criminal Law: Cases, Materials, and Text on the Substantive Criminal Law in its Procedural Context. American Casebook Series. St. Paul, MN: West Pub Co. LCCN 77354398. OCLC 3670876.
- ——— (1980). Criminal Law: Cases, Materials, and Text on the Substantive Criminal Law in its Procedural Context. American Casebook Series. Problems by the author and Myron Moskovitz (2nd ed.). St. Paul, MN: West Pub Co. LCCN 80014283. OCLC 22560980.
- ——— (1985). Criminal Law: Cases, Materials, and Text. American Casebook Series. Problems by the author and Myron Moskovitz (3rd ed.). St. Paul, MN: West Pub Co. ISBN 9780314896827. LCCN 85005079. OCLC 12120243.
- ——— (1988). Goldenberg, Norman S. (ed.). Casenote Legal Briefs. Criminal Law: Adaptable to Courses Utilizing Johnson's Casebook on Criminal Law. Staff writers, Richard A. Lovich, Kemp Richardson. Beverly Hills, CA: Casenotes Pub. Co. ISBN 978-0-87457-093-9. LCCN 89117347. OCLC 20391227.
- ——— (1988). Cases and Materials on Criminal Procedure. American Casebook Series. St. Paul, MN: West Pub Co. ISBN 978-0-314-60025-7. LCCN 87025297. OCLC 16684338.
- —— (1990). Criminal Law: Cases, Materials, and Text. American Casebook Series (4th ed.). St. Paul, MN: West Pu Co. ISBN 978-0-314-72635-3. LCCN 90035247. OCLC 21375540.
- ——— (1991). Goldenberg, Norman S.; Tenen, Peter; Switzer, Robert J. (eds.). Casenote Legal Briefs. Criminal Law: Adaptable to Courses Utilizing Johnson's Casebook on Criminal Law. Staff writers, Richard A. Lovich, Kemp Richardson. Santa Monica, CA: Casenotes Pub. Co. ISBN 978-0-87457-156-1. LCCN 92124154. OCLC 26128520.
- ——— (1994). Cases and Materials on Criminal Procedure. American Casebook Series (2nd ed.). St. Paul, MN: West Pub Co. ISBN 978-0-314-03584-4. LCCN 94013551. OCLC 30156868.
- —— (1995). Criminal Law: Cases, Materials, and Text. American Casebook Series (5th ed.). St. Paul, MN: West Pub Co. ISBN 978-0-314-06410-3. LCCN 95022555. OCLC 32664822.
- ——— (2000). Cases and Materials on Criminal Procedure. American Casebook Series (3rd ed.). St. Paul, MN: West Group. ISBN 978-0-314-24119-1. LCCN 00702489. OCLC 44547056.
- ——— (2000). Criminal Law: Cases, Materials, and Text. American Casebook Series (6th ed.). St. Paul, MN: West Group. ISBN 978-0-314-24091-0. LCCN 00697867. OCLC 45223793.
- ———; Cloud, Morgan (2002). Criminal Law: Cases, Materials, and Text. American Casebook Series (7th ed.). St. Paul, MN: West Group. ISBN 978-0-314-25649-2. LCCN 2003267475. OCLC 50390778.
- Arnold, Brian G.; Caves, Amy Melissa; Rose, Paul; Johnson, Phillip E. (2002). Blatt, Dana L. (ed.). West Group High Court Case Summaries. Criminal Law: Keyed to Johnson's Casebook on Criminal Law (7th ed.). Eagan, MN: West Group. ISBN 978-0-314-14529-1. LCCN 2003265465. OCLC 56517350.
- Johnson, Phillip E.; Cloud, Morgan (2005). Constitutional Criminal Procedure: From Investigation to Trial. American Casebook Series (4th ed.). St. Paul, MN: Thomson/West. ISBN 978-0-314-25660-7. LCCN 2005282241. OCLC 61330436.

=== Darwinism ===
- ——— (1990). Evolution as Dogma: The Establishment of Naturalism. Dallas, TX: Haughton Pub. Co. LCCN 00268240. OCLC 27190651.
- ——— (1991). Darwin on Trial. Washington, DC: Regnery Gateway. ISBN 978-0-89526-535-7. LCCN 90026218. OCLC 22906277.
- ——— (1993). Darwin on Trial (2nd ed.). Downers Grove, IL: InterVarsity Press. ISBN 978-0-8308-1324-7. LCCN 93029217. OCLC 28889094.
- ——— (1995). Reason in the Balance: The Case Against Naturalism in Science, Law & Education. Downers Grove, IL: InterVarsity Press. ISBN 978-0-8308-1610-1. LCCN 95012620. OCLC 32384818.
- ——— (1997). Defeating Darwinism by Opening Minds. Downers Grove, IL: InterVarsity Press. ISBN 978-0-8308-1360-5. LCCN 97012916. OCLC 36621960.
- ——— (1998). Objections Sustained: Subversive Essays on Evolution, Law & Culture. Downers Grove, IL: InterVarsity Press. ISBN 978-0-8308-1941-6. LCCN 98006866. OCLC 38898010.
- —— (2000). The Wedge of Truth: Splitting the Foundations of Naturalism. Downers Grove, IL: InterVarsity Press. ISBN 978-0-8308-2267-6. LCCN 00039586. OCLC 43903750.
- ——— (2002). The Right Questions: Truth, Meaning & Public Debate. Foreword by Nancy Pearcey. Downers Grove, IL: InterVarsity Press. ISBN 978-0-8308-2294-2. LCCN 2002006756. OCLC 49773676.
- ———; Reynolds, John Mark (2010). Against All Gods: What's Right and Wrong About the New Atheism. Downers Grove, IL: InterVarsity Press. ISBN 978-0-8308-3738-0. LCCN 2010000182. OCLC 460060927.
- ——— (2010) [1991; Washington, DC: Regnery Gateway]. Darwin on Trial. New introduction by Michael Behe (20th anniversary, 3rd ed.). Downers Grove, IL: IVP Books. ISBN 978-0-8308-3831-8. LCCN 2010019862. OCLC 615339705.

== See also ==
- List of law clerks for the chief justice of the United States
