= Wedge strategy =

Creationist political and social agenda

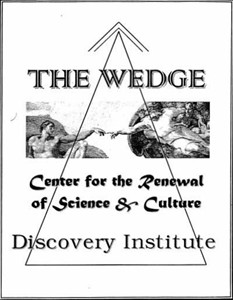
Cover of the Wedge Document.

The wedge strategy is a creationist political and social agenda authored by the Discovery Institute, the hub of the intelligent design movement. The strategy was presented in a Discovery Institute internal memorandum known as the Wedge Document. Its goal is to change American culture by shaping public policy to reflect politically conservative fundamentalist, evangelical, Protestant values. The wedge metaphor is attributed to Phillip E. Johnson and depicts a metal wedge splitting a log.

Intelligent design (ID) is a pseudoscientific presentation of religious belief, asserting that certain features of the universe and of living things are best explained by an intelligent cause, not a naturalistic process such as evolution by natural selection. Implicit in the intelligent design doctrine is a redefining of science and how it is conducted (see theistic science). Wedge strategy proponents are opposed to materialism, naturalism, and evolution, and have made the removal of each from how science is conducted and taught an explicit goal. The strategy was originally brought to the public's attention when the Wedge Document was leaked on the Web. The wedge strategy forms the governing basis of a wide range of Discovery Institute intelligent design campaigns.

== Overview ==
The Wedge Document outlines a public relations campaign meant to sway the opinion of the public, popular media, charitable funding agencies, and public policy makers.

The document sets forth the short-term and long-term goals with milestones for the intelligent design movement, with its governing goals stated in the opening paragraph:

- "To defeat scientific materialism and its destructive moral, cultural and political legacies"
- "To replace materialistic explanations with the theistic understanding that nature and human beings are created by God"

There are three Wedge Projects, referred to in the strategy as three phases designed to reach a governing goal:

- Scientific Research, Writing, and Publicity
- Publicity and Opinion-making
- Cultural Confrontation & Renewal

Recognizing the need for support, the institute affirms the strategy's Christian, evangelistic orientation:

Alongside a focus on the influential opinion-makers, we also seek to build up a popular base of support among our natural constituency, namely, Christians. We will do this primarily through apologetics seminars. We intend these to encourage and equip believers with new scientific evidences that support the faith, as well as to popularize our ideas in the broader culture.

The wedge strategy was designed with both five-year and twenty-year goals in mind in order to achieve the conversion of the mainstream. One notable component of the work was its desire to address perceived social consequences and to promote a social conservative agenda on a wide range of issues including abortion, euthanasia, sexuality, and other social reform movements. It criticized "materialist reformers [who] advocated coercive government programs" which it referred to as "a virulent strain of utopianism".

Beyond promotion of the Phase I goals of proposing Intelligent Design-related research, publications, and attempted integration into academia, the wedge strategy places an emphasis on Phases II and III advocacy aimed at increasing popular support of the Discovery Institute's ideas. Support for the creation of popular-level books, newspaper and magazine articles, op-ed pieces, video productions, and apologetics seminars was hoped to embolden believers and sway the broader culture towards acceptance of intelligent design. This, in turn, would lead the ultimate goal of the wedge strategy; a social and political reformation of American culture.

In 20 years, the group hopes that they will have achieved their goal of making intelligent design the main perspective in science as well as to branch out to ethics, politics, philosophy, theology, and the fine arts. A goal of the wedge strategy is to see intelligent design "permeate religious, cultural, moral and political life." By accomplishing this goal the ultimate goal as stated by the Center for Science and Culture (CSC) of the "overthrow of materialism and its damning cultural legacies" and reinstating the idea that humans are made in the image of God, thereby reforming American culture to reflect conservative Christian values, will be achieved.

The preamble of the Wedge Document is mirrored largely word-for-word in the early mission statement of the CSC, then called the Center for the Renewal of Science and Culture. The theme is again picked up in the controversial book From Darwin to Hitler authored by Center for Science and Culture Fellow Richard Weikart and published with the center's assistance. The wedge strategy was largely authored by Phillip E. Johnson, and features in his book The Wedge of Truth: Splitting the Foundations of Naturalism.

== Origins ==
=== Wedge Document ===
Drafted in 1998 by Discovery Institute staff, the Wedge Document first appeared publicly after it was posted to the World Wide Web on February 5, 1999, by Tim Rhodes, having been shared with him in late January 1999 by Matt Duss, then a part-time employee of a Seattle-based international human-resources firm and now executive vice president at the Center for International Policy. There Duss had been given a document to copy titled The Wedge and marked "Top Secret" and "Not For Distribution."

Discovery Institute co-founder and CSC Vice President Stephen C. Meyer eventually acknowledged the Institute as the source of the document. The Institute still seeks to downplay its significance, saying "Conspiracy theorists in the media continue to recycle the urban legend of the 'Wedge' document". The Institute also portrays the scientific community's reaction to the Wedge document as driven by "Darwinist Paranoia." Despite insisting that intelligent design is not a form of creationism, the Discovery Institute chose to use an image of Michelangelo's The Creation of Adam, depicting God reaching out to impart life from his finger into Adam.

=== Movement and strategy ===
According to Phillip E. Johnson, the wedge movement, if not the term, began in 1992:

The movement we now call the wedge made its public debut at a conference of scientists and philosophers held at Southern Methodist University in March 1992, following the publication of my book Darwin on Trial. The conference brought together key wedge and intelligent design figures, particularly Michael Behe, Stephen Meyer, William Dembski, and myself.

—

In 1993, a year after the SMU conference, "the Johnson-Behe cadre of scholars met at Pajaro Dunes. Here, Behe presented for the first time the seed thoughts that had been brewing in his mind for a year--the idea of 'irreducibly complex' molecular machinery."

Nancy Pearcey, a CSC fellow, and Johnson associate acknowledges Johnson's leadership of the intelligent design movement in two of her most recent publications. In an interview with Johnson for World magazine, Pearcey says, "It is not only in politics that leaders forge movements. Phillip Johnson has developed what is called the 'Intelligent Design' movement." In Christianity Today, she reveals Johnson's religious beliefs and his animosity toward evolution and affirms Johnson as "The unofficial spokesman for ID."

In his 1997 book Defeating Darwinism by Opening Minds Johnson summed up the underlying philosophy of the strategy:

If we understand our own times, we will know that we should affirm the reality of God by challenging the domination of materialism and naturalism in the world of the mind. With the assistance of many friends, I have developed a strategy for doing this... We call our strategy the "wedge.

— pg. 91-92, Defeating Darwinism by Opening Minds

At the 1999 "Reclaiming America for Christ Conference" called by Reverend D. James Kennedy of Coral Ridge Ministries, Johnson gave a speech called "How the Evolution Debate Can Be Won". In it he summed up the theological and epistemological underpinnings of intelligent design and its strategy for winning the battle:

To talk of a purposeful or guided evolution is not to talk about evolution at all. That is slow creation. When you understand it that way, you realize that the Darwinian theory of evolution contradicts not just the Book of Genesis, but every word in the Bible from beginning to end. It contradicts the idea that we are here because a creator brought about our existence for a purpose. That is the first thing I realized, and it carries tremendous meaning." He goes on to state: "I have built an intellectual movement in the universities and churches that we call The Wedge, which is devoted to scholarship and writing that furthers this program of questioning the materialistic basis of science. One very famous book that's come out of The Wedge is biochemist Michael Behe's book, Darwin's Black Box, which has had an enormous impact on the scientific world." ..."Now the way that I see the logic of our movement going is like this. The first thing you understand is that the Darwinian theory isn't true. It's falsified by all of the evidence and the logic is terrible. When did you realize that the next question that occurs to you is, well, where might you get the truth? When I preach from the Bible, as I often do at churches and on Sundays, I don't start with Genesis. I start with John 1:1. In the beginning was the word. In the beginning were intelligence, purpose, and wisdom. The Bible had that right. And the materialist scientists are deluding themselves.

Johnson cites the foundation of intelligent design as The Gospel According to Saint John, in the New Testament, specifically, Chapter 1:1: "In the beginning was the Word, and the Word was with God, and the Word was God" (King James Version).

The 1999 establishment of the Michael Polanyi Center at Baylor University by Baylor president Robert B. Sloan was a major step forward in the wedge strategy. The center was directed by William Dembski and Bruce L. Gordon, with funding from the John Templeton Foundation via the Discovery Institute. The center was disbanded the next year in the face of protests from Baylor's faculty and the recommendation of an outside advisory council. By 2005 Baylor had also hired two other wedge proponents, Walter Bradley and Francis J. Beckwith.

Elaborating on the goals and methods of wedge strategy, Johnson stated in an interview conducted in 2002 for Touchstone Magazine that "The mechanism of the wedge strategy is to make it attractive to Catholics, Orthodox, non-fundamentalist Protestants, observant Jews, and so on." He went on to elaborate:

So the question is: "How to win?" That's when I began to develop what you now see full-fledged in the "wedge" strategy: "Stick with the most important thing" —the mechanism and the building up of information. Get the Bible and the Book of Genesis out of the debate because you do not want to raise the so-called Bible-science dichotomy. Phrase the argument in such a way that you can get it heard in the secular academy and in a way that tends to unify the religious dissenters. That means concentrating on, "Do you need a Creator to do the creating, or can nature do it on its own?" and refusing to get sidetracked onto other issues, which people are always trying to do.

—

Other statements of Johnson's acknowledge that the goal of the intelligent design movement is to promote a theistic and creationist agenda cast as a scientific concept.

Our strategy has been to change the subject a bit so that we can get the issue of intelligent design, which really means the reality of God, before the academic world and into the schools.

—

This isn't really, and never has been a debate about science. It's about religion and philosophy.

—

Critics claim that Johnson's statements validate claims leveled by those who allege that the Discovery Institute and its allied organizations are merely stripping religious content from their anti-evolution, creationist assertions as a means of avoiding the separation of church and state mandated by the Establishment Clause of the First Amendment. The statements, when viewed in the light of the Wedge document and the US District Court's Kitzmiller decision, show ID and the ID movement is an attempt to put a gloss of secularity on top of what is a fundamentally religious belief.

The wedge strategy details a simultaneous assault on state boards of education, state and federal legislatures and on the print and broadcast media. The Discovery Institute has carried out the strategy through its role in the intelligent design movement, where it aggressively promoted ID and its Teach the Controversy campaign to the public, education officials and public policymakers. Intelligent design proponents, through the Discovery Institute, have employed a number of specific political strategies and tactics in their furtherance of their goals. These range from attempts at the state level to undermine or remove altogether the presence of evolutionary theory from the public school classroom, to having the federal government mandate the teaching of intelligent design, to 'stacking' municipal, county and state school boards with ID proponents.

The Discovery Institute has provided material support and assisted federal, state and local elected representatives in drafting legislation that would deemphasize or refute evolution in science curricula. The DI has also supported and advised individual parents and local groups who raise the subject with school boards. During school board meetings in Kansas, Ohio, and Texas, the political and social agenda of the Discovery Institute were used to call into question both the motives of the intelligent design proponents and the validity of their position.

The Discovery Institute fellows have significant advantages in money, political sophistication, and experience over their opponents in the scientific and educational communities, who do not have the benefit of funding from wealthy benefactors, clerical and technical support staff, and expensive advertising campaigns and extensive political networking.

The Discovery Institute's "Teach the Controversy" campaign is designed to leave the scientific establishment looking close-minded, appearing as if it is attempting to stifle and suppress new scientific discoveries that challenge the status quo. This is made with the knowledge that it's unlikely many in the public understand advanced biology or can consult the current scientific literature or contact major scientific organizations to verify Discovery Institute claims. This part of the strategy also plays on undercurrents of anti-intellectualism and distrust of science and scientists that can be found in particular segments of American society.

There is a noticeable conflict between what intelligent design backers tell the public through the media and what they say before conservative Christian audiences. This is studied and deliberate as advocated by wedge strategy author Phillip E. Johnson. When speaking to a mainstream audience and to the media, ID proponents cast ID as a secular, scientific theory. But when speaking to what the Wedge Document calls their "natural constituency, namely (conservative) Christians," ID proponents express themselves in unambiguously religious language. This in the belief that they cannot afford to alienate their constituency and major funding sources, virtually all of which are conservative religious organizations and individuals such as Howard Ahmanson.

Having written extensively about ID, philosopher of science Robert T. Pennock says: "When lobbying for ID in the public schools, wedge members sometimes deny that ID makes any claims about the identity of the designer. It is ironic that their political strategy leads them to deny God in the public square more often than Peter did."

The term "intelligent design" has become a liability for wedge advocates since the ruling in Kitzmiller v. Dover Area School District. Because of the success of the Discovery Institute's public relations campaign to make "intelligent design" a household phrase, and the ruling in Kitzmiller v. Dover Area School District that ID is essentially religious in nature, more people recognize it as the religious concept of creationism. Having come closest to accomplishing getting ID into public school science classes in Kansas and Ohio where they succeeded in getting the State Board of Education to adopt ID lesson plans, intelligent design proponents advocated "teach the controversy" as a legally defensible alternative to teaching intelligent design. The Kitzmiller ruling also characterized "teaching the controversy" as part of the same religious ploy as presenting intelligent design as an alternative to evolution. This prompted a move to a fallback position, teaching "critical analysis" of evolutionary theory. Teaching "critical analysis" is viewed as a means of teaching all the ID arguments without using that label. It also picks up the themes of the teach the controversy strategy, emphasizing what they say are the "strengths and weaknesses" of evolutionary theory and "arguments against evolution," which they falsely portray as "a theory in crisis."

Critics state about the wedge strategy that its "ultimate goal is to create a theocratic state".

== See also ==
- Intelligent design movement
- Kansas evolution hearings
- Santorum Amendment
- Naturalism (philosophy)
