= Darwin on Trial =

1991 book by Phillip E. Johnson

- Author: Phillip E. Johnson
- Published: June 3, 1991 Regnery Gateway (later also published by InterVarsity Press)
- Media type: Print (hardcover and paperback)
- ISBN: 978-0-89526-535-7
- OCLC: 22906277
- Dewey Decimal: 575 20
- LC Class: QH367.3 .J65 1993

Darwin on Trial is a 1991 book by law professor Phillip E. Johnson disputing certain tenets of Neo-Darwinism and promoting other possible solutions which rejecting pure creation science. Johnson wrote the book with the thesis that evolution could be "tried" like a defendant in court. Darwin on Trial became a central text of the intelligent design movement, and Johnson has been described as the "father of ID".

== Contents ==
The book begins by recounting Edwards v. Aguillard, a US Supreme Court case regarding a Louisiana law requiring that if "evolution-science" is taught in the public schools, the schools must also provide balanced treatment for something called "creation science"; the court deemed the law an "establishment of religion". Johnson states that an associated amicus curiae brief by the National Academy of Sciences improperly "defined 'science' in such a way that [it was impossible to] dispute the claims of the scientific establishment" and a rule it proposed against "negative argumentation [eliminated] the possibility that science has not discovered how complex organisms could have developed". The book then goes on to give various arguments against evolution.

== Reception ==
Darwin on Trial brought significant media attention to the creationist movement. Johnson said in an interview in California Monthly that he fully expected to be labeled a "kook" by the academy, but he was "pleasantly surprised" by its reception at Berkeley.

Anthropologist Eugenie Scott wrote that the book "teaches little that is accurate about either the nature of science, or the topic of evolution. It is recommended neither by scientists nor educators." Scott also points out that Johnson criticizes the theory of evolution for changing to accommodate new data, indicating a profound misunderstanding of this strength of science which must adjust theories in order to explain contradictory or new information. In a second review, Scott further states that Johnson lacks familiarity with the specifics and nuances of the field necessary to match the critiques of Darwinism offered by evolutionary biologists, and instead parrots the criticisms made by suspect sources, most of his arguments being recycled from scientific creationists.

The book initially received more attention from popular media than from the scientific community, although soon after the book was released, Eugenie Scott of the National Center for Science Education responded to it, saying "scientific creationists" like Johnson "confuse the general public, by mixing up the controversy among scientists about how evolution took place, with a more general question of whether it took place at all".

Stephen Jay Gould gave a harsh review in Scientific American, writing that the book contains "no weighing of evidence, no careful reading of literature on all sides, no full citation of sources (the book does not even contain a bibliography) and occasional use of scientific literature only to score rhetorical points." and the book caught the attention of Nobel Laureate Steven Weinberg.

Johnson's claim to impartiality has been contradicted by reviewers who state that "the driving force behind Johnson's book was neither fairness nor accuracy", and that the claim of impartiality is contradicted by Johnson's stated aim "to legitimate the assertion of a theistic worldview in the secular universities".

Robert T. Pennock rebutted Johnson's belief that science was improperly defined within Edwards v. Aguillard, stating that the dual model of science established by Johnson (either creationism or evolution is correct and true, and by disproving any part of evolution creationism 'wins' by default) is a false dilemma, a type of informal fallacy, writing "It always comes as a shock to someone who has been taught by Creationists to believe that Christianity is incompatible with evolution and that it is not only false but of the devil, to learn that most Christians see no conflict between evolution and their faith, and that the Catholic church and many Protestant denominations have made explicit policy statements to that effect."

Henry Bauer, professor of Chemistry and Science Studies at Virginia Polytechnic Institute and State University, reviewed the book, saying Johnson "misleads about science and about what science says about evolution." Bauer explained, "Johnson lumps evolutionists together as Darwinists...but Johnson doesn't understand that even Darwin's original 'theory' contains at least five separate concepts that can be held independently." In his case studies, for example, "with the Velikovsky affair, there is much more rhetoric than substance." Bauer noted that when "archaeopteryx cannot be explained away...Johnson calls it 'a point for the Darwinists, but how important ...?' - as though science were suggesting something else."

== Reviews ==
- Elsberry, Wesley R. "An extended review of Phillip E. Johnson's 'Darwin On Trial'". Anti Evolution. Archived from the original on September 6, 2003.
- Gould, Stephen Jay (1992). "Impeaching a Self-Appointed Judge". Scientific American. 267 (1).
- Murphy, Nancey (1993). "Phillip Johnson on Trial: A Critique of His Critique of Darwin". American Scientific Affiliation.
- Scott, Eugenie C.; Sager, Thomas C. (1992). "Review Article: Darwin on Trial, by Phillip Johnson". Creation Evolution Journal. 12 (2).
- Gray, Terry M. (13 April 1992). "The Mistrial of Evolution: A review of Phillip E. Johnson's Darwin on Trial". American Scientific Affiliation.
- Bauer, Henry H. "Book Review: Darwin on Trial by Phillip E. Johnson" (PDF). Journal of Scientific Exploration. 6 (2): 181. Archived from the original (PDF) on 2010-07-06.

Creationist

- Bohlin, Raymond (1992). "Darwin on Trial". Leadership U. Probe Ministries International. (press release?)
- Duffy, Cathy (1 March 2016). "Darwin on Trial". Cathy Duffy Reviews.
- Johnson, Phillip E. (1997). "Response to Gould". ARN. (not a review)
