= Intelligent design and science =

Relationship between intelligent design and science

The relationship between intelligent design and science has been a contentious one. Intelligent design (ID) is presented by its proponents as science and claims to offer an alternative to evolution. The Discovery Institute, a politically conservative think tank and the leading proponent of intelligent design, launched a campaign entitled "Teach the Controversy", which claims that a controversy exists within the scientific community over evolution. The scientific community rejects intelligent design as a form of creationism, and the basic facts of evolution are not a matter of controversy in science.

== "Teach the Controversy" ==
The intelligent design movement states that there is a debate among scientists about whether life evolved. The movement stresses the importance of recognizing the existence of this supposed debate, seeking to convince the public, politicians, and cultural leaders that schools should "Teach the Controversy". In fact, there is no such controversy in the scientific community; the scientific consensus is that life evolved. Intelligent design is widely viewed as a stalking horse for its proponents' campaign against what they say is the materialist foundation of science, which they argue leaves no room for the possibility of God.

== Neo-creationism ==
Advocates of intelligent design from a Christian standpoint seek to keep God and the Bible out of the discussion, and present intelligent design in the language of science as though it were a scientific hypothesis. (Note: "...intelligent design does not address metaphysical and religious questions such as the nature or identity of the designer," and "...the nature, moral character and purposes of this intelligence lie beyond the competence of science and must be left to religion and philosophy". In: "Truth Sheet # 09-05 Does intelligent design postulate a "supernatural creator?". Discovery Institute.) However, among a significant proportion of the general public in the United States the major concern is whether conventional evolutionary biology is compatible with belief in God and in the Bible, and how this issue is taught in schools. The public controversy was given widespread media coverage in the United States, particularly during the Kitzmiller v. Dover trial in late 2005 and after President George W. Bush expressed support for the idea of teaching intelligent design alongside evolution in August 2005. In response to Bush's statement and the pending federal trial, Time magazine ran an eight-page cover story on the Evolution Wars in which they examined the issue of teaching intelligent design in the classroom. The cover of the magazine featured a parody of The Creation of Adam from the Sistine Chapel. Rather than pointing at Adam, Michelangelo's God points at the image of a chimpanzee contemplating the caption reading "The push to teach 'intelligent design' raises a question: Does God have a place in science class?". In the Kitzmiller v. Dover case, the court ruled that intelligent design was a religious and creationist position, finding that God and intelligent design were both distinct from the material that should be covered in a science class. (Note: "ID is not a new scientific argument, but is rather an old religious argument for the existence of God. He traced this argument back to at least Thomas Aquinas in the 13th century, who framed the argument as a syllogism: Wherever complex design exists, there must have been a designer; nature is complex; therefore nature must have had an intelligent designer." "This argument for the existence of God was advanced early in the 19th century by Reverend Paley" (the teleological argument) "The only apparent difference between the argument made by Paley and the argument for ID, as expressed by defense expert witnesses Behe and Minnich, is that ID's 'official position' does not acknowledge that the designer is God." Kitzmiller v. Dover Area School District, 04 cv 2688 (December 20, 2005)., Ruling, p. 24.)

== Theistic science ==
Empirical science uses the scientific method to create a posteriori knowledge based on observation and repeated testing of hypotheses and theories. Intelligent design proponents seek to change this fundamental basis of science by eliminating "methodological naturalism" from science and replacing it with what the leader of the intelligent design movement, Phillip E. Johnson, calls "theistic realism". Some have called this approach "methodological supernaturalism", which means belief in a transcendent, nonnatural dimension of reality inhabited by a transcendent, nonnatural deity. Intelligent design proponents argue that naturalistic explanations fail to explain certain phenomena and that supernatural explanations provide a very simple and intuitive explanation for the origins of life and the universe. Proponents say evidence exists in the forms of irreducible complexity and specified complexity that cannot be explained by natural processes. They also hold that religious neutrality requires the teaching of both evolution and intelligent design in schools, saying that teaching only evolution unfairly discriminates against those holding creationist beliefs. Teaching both, they argue, allows for the possibility of religious belief, without causing the state to actually promote such beliefs. Many intelligent design followers believe that "Scientism" is itself a religion that promotes secularism and materialism in an attempt to erase theism from public life, and they view their work in the promotion of intelligent design as a way to return religion to a central role in education and other public spheres. Some allege that this larger debate is often the subtext for arguments made over intelligent design, though others note that intelligent design serves as an effective proxy for the religious beliefs of prominent intelligent design proponents in their efforts to advance their religious point of view within society.

It has been argued that methodological naturalism is not an assumption of science, but a result of science well done: the God explanation is the least parsimonious, so according to Occam's razor, it cannot be a scientific explanation.

Intelligent design has not presented a credible scientific case, substituting public support for scientific research. If the argument to give "equal time for all theories" were actually practiced, there would be no logical limit to the number of mutually incompatible supernatural "theories" regarding the origins and diversity of life to be taught in the public school system, including intelligent design parodies such as the Flying Spaghetti Monster "theory"; intelligent design does not provide a mechanism for discriminating among them. Philosopher of biology Elliott Sober, for example, states that intelligent design is not falsifiable because "[d]efenders of ID always have a way out". Intelligent design proponent Michael Behe concedes "You can't prove intelligent design by experiment".

The inference that an intelligent designer created life on Earth, which advocate William Dembski has said could alternately be an "alien" life force, has been compared to the a priori claim that aliens helped the ancient Egyptians build the pyramids. In both cases, the effect of this outside intelligence is not repeatable, observable or falsifiable, and it violates the principle of parsimony. From a strictly empirical standpoint, one may list what is known about Egyptian construction techniques, but one must admit ignorance about exactly how the Egyptians built the pyramids.

== Inter-faith outreach ==
Supporters of intelligent design have also reached out to other faith groups with similar accounts of creation with the hope that the broader coalition will have greater influence in supporting science education that does not contradict their religious views. Many religious bodies have responded by expressing support for evolution. The Roman Catholic Church has stated that religious faith is fully compatible with science, which is limited to dealing only with the natural world—a position described by the term theistic evolution. While some in the Roman Catholic Church reject Intelligent design for various philosophical and theological reasons, others, such as Christoph Schönborn, Archbishop of Vienna, have shown support for it. The arguments of intelligent design have been directly challenged by the over 10,000 clergy who signed the Clergy Letter Project. Prominent scientists who strongly express religious faith, such as the astronomer George Coyne and the biologist Ken Miller, have been at the forefront of opposition to intelligent design. While creationist organizations have welcomed intelligent design's support against naturalism, they have also been critical of its refusal to identify the designer, and have pointed to previous failures of the same argument.

Rabbi Natan Slifkin directly criticized the advocates of intelligent design as presenting a perspective of God that is dangerous to religion. Those who promote it as parallel to religion, he asserts, do not truly understand it. Slifkin criticizes intelligent design's advocacy of teaching their perspective in biology classes, wondering why no one claims that God's hand should be taught in other secular classes, such as history, physics or geology. Slifkin also asserts that the intelligent design movement is inordinately concerned with portraying God as "in control" when it comes to things that cannot be easily explained by science, but not in control in respect to things which can be explained by scientific theory. Kenneth Miller expressed a view similar to Slifkin's: "[T]he struggles of the Intelligent Design movement are best understood as clamorous and disappointing double failures—rejected by science because they do not fit the facts, and having failed religion because they think too little of God.

Intelligent design also has advocates from an Islamic standpoint who believe that, while life may have developed in stages over time, human beings are uniquely created by Allah and not evolved from our common ancestor with apes. It is from Adam and Hawwa (Eve) that humanity is said to have originated from.

== Defining science ==
Science is a systematic enterprise that builds and organizes knowledge in the form of testable explanations and predictions about the world. The boundaries between what is and what is not to be considered science, known as the demarcation problem, continues to be debated among philosophers of science and scientists in various fields.

The U.S. National Academy of Sciences has stated that "creationism, intelligent design, and other claims of supernatural intervention in the origin of life or of species are not science because they are not testable by the methods of science." The U.S. National Science Teachers Association and the American Association for the Advancement of Science have termed it pseudoscience. (Note: National Science Teachers Association, a professional association of 55,000 science teachers and administrators "National Science Teachers Association Disappointed About Intelligent Design Comments Made by President Bush" (Press release). National Science Teachers Association. August 3, 2005. Archived from the original on September 8, 2021. "We stand with the nation's leading scientific organizations and scientists, including Dr. John Marburger, the president's top science advisor, in stating that intelligent design is not science....It is simply not fair to present pseudoscience to students in the science classroom.") Others in the scientific community have concurred, and some have called it junk science. (Note: Attie, A. D.; Sober, E; Numbers, RL; Amasino, RM; Cox, B; Berceau, T; Powell, T; Cox, MM (2006). "Defending science education against intelligent design: a call to action". Journal of Clinical Investigation. 116 (5). American Society for Clinical Investigation: 1134–1138. doi:10.1172/JCI28449. PMC 1451210. PMID 16670753.: Orr, H. Allen (May 2005). "Devolution—Why intelligent design isn't". The New Yorker. "Biologists aren't alarmed by intelligent design's arrival in Dover and elsewhere because they have all sworn allegiance to atheistic materialism; they're alarmed because intelligent design is junk science."; Robert T. Pennock Tower of Babel: The Evidence Against the New Creationism.; Bergin, Mark (February 25, 2006). "Junk science". World. Archived from the original on January 7, 2012.) For a theory to qualify as scientific, (Note: Gauch, Jr., Hugh G. (2003). "Chapters 5–8". Scientific Method in Practice. Cambridge UP. ISBN 0-521-01708-4. Discusses principles of induction, deduction and probability related to the expectation of consistency, testability, and multiple observations. Chapter 8 discusses parsimony (Occam's razor)) (Note: Kitzmiller v. Dover Area School District, 04 cv 2688 (December 20, 2005)., 4: whether ID is science. The ruling discusses central aspects of expectations in the scientific community that a scientific theory be testable, dynamic, correctible, progressive, based upon multiple observations, and provisional,) it is expected to be:

- Consistent
- Parsimonious (sparing in its proposed entities or explanations, see Occam's Razor)
- Useful (describes and explains observed phenomena, and can be used predictively)
- Empirically testable and falsifiable (see Falsifiability)
- Based on multiple observations, often in the form of controlled, repeated experiments
- Correctable and dynamic (modified in the light of observations that do not support it)
- Progressive (refines previous theories)
- Provisional or tentative (is open to experimental checking, and does not assert certainty)

For any theory, hypothesis or conjecture to be considered scientific, it must meet most, and ideally all, of these criteria. The fewer criteria are met, the less scientific it is; and if it meets only a few or none at all, then it cannot be treated as scientific in any meaningful sense of the word. Typical objections to defining intelligent design as science are that it lacks consistency, violates the principle of parsimony, (Note: Intelligent design fails to pass Occam's razor. Adding entities (an intelligent agent, a designer) to the equation is not strictly necessary to explain events. See, e.g., Fitelson, Branden; et al. (2001). "How Not to Detect Design–Critical Notice: William A. Dembski The Design Inference". In Robert T. Pennock (ed.). Intelligent Design Creationism and Its Critics: Philosophical, Theological, and Scientific Perspectives. MIT Press. pp. 597–616.) is not scientifically useful, (Note: See, e.g., Schneider, Jill E. (2005). "Thoughts on Evolution and Intelligent Design". Department of Biological Sciences, Lehigh University. Archived from the original on 2006-09-02. "Q: Why couldn't intelligent design also be a scientific theory? A: The idea of intelligent design might or might not be true, but when presented as a scientific hypothesis, it is not useful because it is based on weak assumptions, lacks supporting data and terminates further thought.") is not falsifiable, (Note: The designer is not falsifiable, since its existence is typically asserted without sufficient conditions to allow a falsifying observation. The designer being beyond the realm of the observable, claims about its existence can be neither supported nor undermined by observation, making intelligent design and the argument from design analytic a posteriori arguments. See, e.g., Kitzmiller v. Dover Area School District, 04 cv 2688 (December 20, 2005). Ruling, p. 22 and p. 77.) is not empirically testable, (Note: That intelligent design is not empirically testable stems from the fact that it violates a basic premise of science, naturalism. See, e.g., Kitzmiller v. Dover Area School District, 04 cv 2688 (December 20, 2005). Ruling, p. 22 and p. 66.) and is not correctable, dynamic, provisional or progressive. (Note: Intelligent design professes to offer an answer that does not need to be defined or explained, the intelligent agent, designer. By asserting a conclusion that cannot be accounted for scientifically, the designer, intelligent design cannot be sustained by any further explanation, and objections raised to those who accept intelligent design make little headway. Thus intelligent design is not a provisional assessment of data, which can change when new information is discovered. Once it is claimed that a conclusion that need not be accounted for has been established, there is simply no possibility of future correction. The idea of the progressive growth of scientific ideas is required to explain previous data and any previously unexplainable data. See, e.g., the brief explanation in Kitzmiller v. Dover Area School District, 04 cv 2688 (December 20, 2005). p. 66.) (Note: "Nobel Laureates Initiative" (PDF). The Elie Wiesel Foundation for Humanity. September 9, 2005. Archived from the original (PDF) on October 7, 2005. The September 2005 statement by 38 Nobel laureates stated that: "Intelligent design is fundamentally unscientific; it cannot be tested as scientific theory because its central conclusion is based on belief in the intervention of a supernatural agent".) (Note: "Intelligent Design is not Science: Scientists and teachers speak out". University of New South Wales. October 2005. Archived from the original on 2006-06-14. The October 2005 statement, by a coalition representing more than 70,000 Australian scientists and science teachers said: "intelligent design is not science" and called on "all schools not to teach Intelligent Design (ID) as science, because it fails to qualify on every count as a scientific theory".)

Critics also say that the intelligent design doctrine does not meet the Daubert Standard, the criteria for scientific evidence mandated by the US Supreme Court. The Daubert Standard governs which evidence can be considered scientific in United States federal courts and most state courts. Its four criteria are:

- The theoretical underpinnings of the methods must yield testable predictions by means of which the theory could be falsified.
- The methods should preferably be published in a peer-reviewed journal.
- There should be a known rate of error that can be used in evaluating the results.
- The methods should be generally accepted within the relevant scientific community.

In Kitzmiller v. Dover Area School District, using these criteria and others mentioned above, Judge Jones ruled that "... we have addressed the seminal question of whether ID is science. We have concluded that it is not, and moreover that ID cannot uncouple itself from its creationist, and thus religious, antecedents".

At the Kitzmiller trial, philosopher Robert T. Pennock described a common approach to distinguishing science from non-science as examining a theory's compliance with methodological naturalism, the basic method in science of seeking natural explanations without assuming the existence or nonexistence of the supernatural. Intelligent design proponents criticize this method and argue that science, if its goal is to discover truth, must be able to accept evidentially supported, supernatural explanations. Additionally, philosopher of science Larry Laudan and cosmologist Sean Carroll argue against any a priori criteria for distinguishing science from pseudoscience. Laudan, as well as philosopher Barbara Forrest, state that the content of the hypothesis must first be examined to determine its ability to solve empirical problems. Methodological naturalism is therefore an a posteriori criterion due to its ability to yield consistent results.

== Peer review ==
The failure to follow the procedures of scientific discourse and the failure to submit work to the scientific community that withstands scrutiny have weighed against intelligent design being accepted as valid science. The intelligent design movement has not published a properly peer-reviewed article supporting ID in a scientific journal, and has failed to publish peer-reviewed research or data supporting ID.

Intelligent design, by appealing to a supernatural agent, directly conflicts with the principles of science, which limit its inquiries to empirical, observable and ultimately testable data and which require explanations to be based on empirical evidence. Dembski, Behe and other intelligent design proponents say bias by the scientific community is to blame for the failure of their research to be published. Intelligent design proponents believe that their writings are rejected for not conforming to purely naturalistic, non-supernatural mechanisms rather than because their research is not up to "journal standards", and that the merit of their articles is overlooked. Some scientists describe this claim as a conspiracy theory. Michael Shermer has rebutted the claim, noting "Anyone who thinks that scientists do not question Darwinism has never been to an evolutionary conference." He noted that scientists such as Joan Roughgarden and Lynn Margulis have challenged certain Darwinist theories and offered explanations of their own and despite this they "have not been persecuted, shunned, fired or even expelled. Why? Because they are doing science, not religion." The issue that supernatural explanations do not conform to the scientific method became a sticking point for intelligent design proponents in the 1990s, and is addressed in the wedge strategy as an aspect of science that must be challenged before intelligent design can be accepted by the broader scientific community.

Critics and advocates debate over whether intelligent design produces new research and has legitimately attempted to publish this research. For instance, the Templeton Foundation, a former funder of the Discovery Institute and a major supporter of projects seeking to reconcile science and religion, says that it asked intelligent design proponents to submit proposals for actual research, but none were ever submitted. Charles L. Harper Jr., foundation vice-president, said: "From the point of view of rigor and intellectual seriousness, the intelligent design people don't come out very well in our world of scientific review".

The only article published in a peer-reviewed scientific journal that made a case for intelligent design was quickly withdrawn by the publisher for having circumvented the journal's peer-review standards. Written by the Discovery Institute's Center for Science & Culture Director Stephen C. Meyer, it appeared in the peer-reviewed journal Proceedings of the Biological Society of Washington in August 2004. The article was a literature review, which means that it did not present any new research, but rather culled quotations and claims from other papers to argue that the Cambrian explosion could not have happened by natural processes. The choice of venue for this article was also considered problematic, because it was so outside the normal subject matter (see Sternberg peer review controversy (Note: The Sternberg peer review controversy and several similar academic disputes are the subject of the 2008 documentary "Expelled: No Intelligence Allowed".)). Dembski has written that "perhaps the best reason [to be skeptical of his ideas] is that intelligent design has yet to establish itself as a thriving scientific research program." In a 2001 interview, Dembski said that he stopped submitting to peer-reviewed journals because of their slow time-to-print and that he makes more money from publishing books.

In the Dover trial, the judge found that intelligent design features no scientific research or testing. There, intelligent design proponents cited just one paper, on simulation modeling of evolution by Behe and David Snoke, which mentioned neither irreducible complexity nor intelligent design and which Behe admitted did not rule out known evolutionary mechanisms. Michael Lynch called the conclusions of the article "an artifact of unwarranted biological assumptions, inappropriate mathematical modeling, and faulty logic". In sworn testimony, however, Behe said: "There are no peer reviewed articles by anyone advocating for intelligent design supported by pertinent experiments or calculations which provide detailed rigorous accounts of how intelligent design of any biological system occurred". As summarized by the judge, Behe conceded that there are no peer-reviewed articles supporting his claims of intelligent design or irreducible complexity. In his ruling, the judge wrote: "A final indicator of how ID has failed to demonstrate scientific warrant is the complete absence of peer-reviewed publications supporting the theory".

The Discovery Institute has published lists of articles and books which they say support intelligent design and have been peer-reviewed, including the two articles mentioned above. Critics, largely members of the scientific community, reject this claim, stating that no established scientific journal has yet published an intelligent design article. Rather, intelligent design proponents have set up their own journals with peer review that lacks impartiality and rigor, consisting entirely of intelligent design supporters. Critics also state that even if these papers could be accepted as cases of support for intelligent design passing peer review, the output from the ID community is still fairly minuscule, especially when compared to the number of peer reviewed articles supporting evolution. Critics state that publishing material is not enough; that scientific ideas must withstand scrutiny and be built upon and that any papers supporting ID have not led to any productive work.

== Intelligence as an observable quality ==
The phrase intelligent design makes use of an assumption of the quality of an observable intelligence, a concept that has no scientific consensus definition. William Dembski, for example, has written that "Intelligence leaves behind a characteristic signature". The characteristics of intelligence are assumed by intelligent design proponents to be observable without specifying what the criteria for the measurement of intelligence should be. Dembski, instead, asserts that "in special sciences ranging from forensics to archaeology to SETI (the Search for Extraterrestrial Intelligence), appeal to a designing intelligence is indispensable". How this appeal is made and what this implies as to the definition of intelligence are topics left largely unaddressed. Seth Shostak, a researcher with the SETI Institute, disputed Dembski's comparison of SETI and intelligent design, saying that intelligent design advocates base their inference of design on complexity—the argument being that some biological systems are too complex to have been made by natural processes—while SETI researchers are looking primarily for artificiality.

Critics say that the design detection methods proposed by intelligent design proponents are radically different from conventional design detection, undermining the key elements that make it possible as legitimate science. Intelligent design proponents, they say, are proposing both searching for a designer without knowing anything about that designer's abilities, parameters, or intentions (which scientists do know when searching for the results of human intelligence), as well as denying the very distinction between natural/artificial design that allows scientists to compare complex designed artifacts against the background of the sorts of complexity found in nature. (Note: "For human artifacts, we know the designer's identity, human, and the mechanism of design, as we have experience based upon empirical evidence that humans can make such things, as well as many other attributes including the designer's abilities, needs, and desires. With ID, proponents assert that they refuse to propose hypotheses on the designer's identity, do not propose a mechanism, and the designer, he/she/it/they, has never been seen. In that vein, defense expert Professor Minnich agreed that in the case of human artifacts and objects, we know the identity and capacities of the human designer, but we do not know any of those attributes for the designer of biological life. In addition, Professor Behe agreed that for the design of human artifacts, we know the designer and its attributes and we have a baseline for human design that does not exist for design of biological systems. Professor Behe's only response to these seemingly insurmountable points of disanalogy was that the inference still works in science fiction movies".—Kitzmiller v. Dover Area School District, 04 cv 2688 (December 20, 2005)., p. 81)

As a means of criticism, certain skeptics have pointed to a challenge of intelligent design derived from the study of artificial intelligence. The criticism is a counter to intelligent design claims about what makes a design intelligent, specifically that "no preprogrammed device can be truly intelligent, that intelligence is irreducible to natural processes". This claim is similar in type to an assumption of Cartesian dualism that posits a strict separation between "mind" and the material Universe. However, in studies of artificial intelligence, while there is an implicit assumption that supposed "intelligence" or creativity of a computer program is determined by the capabilities given to it by the computer programmer, artificial intelligence need not be bound to an inflexible system of rules. Rather, if a computer program can access randomness as a function, this effectively allows for a flexible, creative, and adaptive intelligence. Evolutionary algorithms, a subfield of machine learning (itself a subfield of artificial intelligence), have been used to mathematically demonstrate that randomness and selection can be used to "evolve" complex, highly adapted structures that are not explicitly designed by a programmer. Evolutionary algorithms use the Darwinian metaphor of random mutation, selection and the survival of the fittest to solve diverse mathematical and scientific problems that are usually not solvable using conventional methods. Intelligence derived from randomness is essentially indistinguishable from the "innate" intelligence associated with biological organisms, and poses a challenge to the intelligent design conception that intelligence itself necessarily requires a designer. Cognitive science continues to investigate the nature of intelligence along these lines of inquiry. The intelligent design community, for the most part, relies on the assumption that intelligence is readily apparent as a fundamental and basic property of complex systems.
