= Barrick =

Barrick may refer to:

- Barrick Gaming Corporation, a Las Vegas-based gambling company
- Barrick Mining, a Canadian mining company
- Barrick Nealy (born 1983), football quarterback in the CFL
- David Barrick (born 1984), English cricketer
- Dean Barrick (born 1969), English footballer
- Des Barrick (1926–2007), English cricketer
- Jeffrey Barrick, American biologist
- Jesse T. Barrick (1841–1923)[2], American soldier and Medal of Honor recipient
- Murray Barrick, professor of business

== See also ==
- Barack (disambiguation)
- Barrique
