= Nanopond =

Nanopond may refer to:

- a billionth of a pond
- a digital organism simulator; see Artificial life#Program-based
