= Claus O. Wilke =

German computational and evolutionary biologist

Claus Wilke
- Born: 1972 (age 53–54); Germany
- Education: Ruhr University Bochum
- Scientific career
- Fields: Evolutionary Biology and Computational Biology
- Workplaces: University of Texas at Austin
- Thesis: Evolutionary Dynamics in Time-Dependent Environments (1999)
- Doctoral advisor: Thomas Martinetz

Claus O. Wilke is a computational and evolutionary biologist and chair of the Department of Integrative Biology at University of Texas at Austin, where he is the Dwight W. and Blanche Faye Reeder Centennial Fellow in Systematic and Evolutionary Biology, and currently holds the Joseph J. & Jeanne M. Lagowski Regents Professorship in Molecular Bioscience.

== Education and career ==
Wilke obtained a Ph.D. in theoretical physics at the Ruhr University Bochum in 1999, and subsequently worked as a postdoctoral research fellow at the California Institute of Technology in the lab of Chris Adami. He moved to UT Austin as an assistant professor in 2006, where he is now professor, department chair, and director of the Wilke Lab. Wilke studies the evolution of molecules and viruses using theoretical and computational methods. He is also active in the field of data visualisation and is the author of the Cowplot and ggridges R packages.
