= Evolution@Home =

2001 volunteer computing project

evolution@home
- evolution@home screensaver
- Platform: BOINC

evolution@home was a volunteer computing project for evolutionary biology, launched in 2001. The aim of evolution@home is to improve understanding of evolutionary processes. This is achieved by simulating individual-based models. The Simulator005 module of evolution@home was designed to better predict the behaviour of Muller's ratchet.

The project was operated semi-automatically; participants had to manually download tasks from the webpage and submit results by email using this method of operation. yoyo@home used a BOINC wrapper to completely automate this project by automatically distributing tasks and collecting their results. Therefore, the BOINC version was a complete volunteer computing project. yoyo@home has declared its involvement in this project finished.

== See also ==
- Artificial life
- Digital organism
- Evolutionary computation
- Folding@home
- List of volunteer computing projects
