= Tierra (computer simulation) =

Computer simulation of life by the ecologist Thomas S. Ray

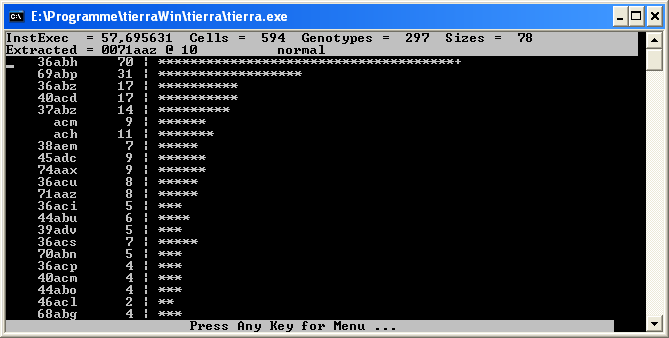
A running Tierra simulation

Tierra is a computer simulation developed by ecologist Thomas S. Ray in the early 1990s in which computer programs compete for time (central processing unit (CPU) time) and space (access to main memory). In this context, the computer programs in Tierra are considered to be evolvable and can mutate, self-replicate and recombine. Tierra's virtual machine is written in C. It operates on a custom instruction set designed to facilitate code changes and reordering, including features such as jump to template (as opposed to the relative or absolute jumps common to most instruction sets).

== Simulations ==
The basic Tierra model has been used to experimentally explore in silico the basic processes of evolutionary and ecological dynamics. Processes such as the dynamics of punctuated equilibrium, host-parasite co-evolution and density-dependent natural selection are amenable to investigation within the Tierra framework. A notable difference between Tierra and more conventional models of evolutionary computation, such as genetic algorithms, is that there is no explicit, or exogenous fitness function built into the model. Often in such models there is the notion of a function being "optimized"; in the case of Tierra, the fitness function is endogenous: there is simply survival and death.

According to Thomas S. Ray and others, this may allow for more "open-ended" evolution, in which the dynamics of the feedback between evolutionary and ecological processes can itself change over time (see evolvability), although this claim has not been realized – like other digital evolution systems, it eventually reaches a point where novelty ceases to be created, and the system at large begins either looping or ceases to 'evolve'. The issue of how true open-ended evolution can be implemented in an artificial system is still an open question in the field of artificial life.

Mark Bedau and Norman Packard developed a statistical method of classifying evolutionary systems and in 1997, Bedau et al. applied these statistics to Evita, an Artificial life model similar to Tierra and Avida, but with limited organism interaction and no parasitism, and concluded that Tierra-like systems do not exhibit the open-ended evolutionary signatures of naturally evolving systems.

Russell K. Standish has measured the informational complexity of Tierran 'organisms', and has similarly not observed complexity growth in Tierran evolution.

Tierra is an abstract model, but any quantitative model is still subject to the same validation and verification techniques applied to more traditional mathematical models, and as such, has no special status. The creation of more detailed models in which more realistic dynamics of biological systems and organisms are incorporated is now an active research field (see systems biology).

== See also ==
- Avida
- Digital organism
- Digital organism simulator
- Evolutionary computation
- Fitness landscape
