= Zachary Blount =

American evolutionary biologist

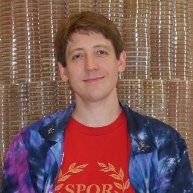
- Zachary Blount in front of a tower of petri dishes used in his experiment.
- Education: PhD, Master's Degree
- Alma mater: Michigan State University; University of Cincinnati; Georgia Institute of Technology
- Known for: E. coli long-term evolution experiment
- Scientific career
- Fields: Evolutionary Biology; Microbiology; Molecular Genetics
- Institutions: Michigan State University; The Beacon Center for the Study of Evolution in Action; Kenyon College
- Thesis: The Evolution of a Key Innovation in an Experimental Population of Escherichia coli: A Tale of Opportunity, Contingency, and Co-Option. (2011)
- Doctoral advisor: Richard Lenski

Zachary D. Blount is an American evolutionary biologist best known for his work on the evolution of a key innovation, aerobic growth on citrate, in one of the twelve populations of the E. coli long-term evolution experiment. Blount is an assistant professor and Director of Graduate Education Innovation in the Department of Microbiology, Genetics, and Immunology at Michigan State University. He was previously a postdoctoral research assistant for Richard Lenski and a visiting assistant professor of biology at Kenyon College from 2018 to 2019.

== Early life and education ==
Zachary D. Blount was born and raised in Georgia where he developed an early interest in science. He earned high honors in Biology at Georgia Institute of Technology, where he was introduced to microbiology by professor emeritus Thomas Tornabene. He obtained his master's from the University of Cincinnati, where he worked on insertion sequence elements of hyperthermoacidophilic Archaea of the genus Sulfolobus under the guidance of Dennis Grogan. He moved to Michigan State University in 2003 for his doctoral work with Richard Lenski.

== Research ==
In 2003, 15 years and 33,000 generations after Richard Lenski had set up the long term evolution experiment, one lineage of E.coli began to show very high turbidity. Work done by postdoctoral researcher Christina Borland showed that this elevated turbidity was due not to contamination, and confirmed that aerobic growth on citrate had spontaneously evolved in the population. Blount went on to conduct a series of "evolutionary replay experiments" in which he replayed the evolution of the population in which aerobic citrate usage evolved from different clonal genotypes isolated from different time points to examine how the propensity to mutate to Cit^{+} changed. This analysis involved examination of several trillion bacterial cells, and showed that clones from later generations had significantly increased rates of mutation to Cit^{+}, indicating that evolution of the trait in the population was contingent upon a history in which "potentiating" mutations accumulated that made it mutationally accessible. Later genomic analysis of clones from the population established the immediate genetic and biochemical basis of the Cit^{+} trait to be a tandem duplication mutation that placed a silent citrate transporter gene under the control of a new promoter that caused its expression when oxygen is present, an example of promoter capture and gene exaptation. Based on these findings, Blount proposed a model for the evolution of complex traits: 1. potentiation, in which mutations that make the trait evolutionarily accessible accumulate, 2. actualization, in which a mutation produces a phenotypic switch in which the new trait is manifested, and 3. refinement, in which natural selection accumulates subsequent mutations that make the new trait more effective.

Currently, Blount is further investigating how complex traits evolve, how novel traits impact ecology, and how speciation occurs in asexual populations based on models proposed by Fredrick Cohan of Wesleyan University.
