= Hugo Bedau =

American philosopher

Hugo Adam Bedau
- Born: September 23, 1926
- Died: August 13, 2012 (aged 85)

Academic background
- Education: University of Redlands; Boston University (MS); Harvard University (PhD)

Academic work
- Discipline: Philosophy
- Institutions: Tufts University
- Main interests: Capital punishment

Hugo Adam Bedau (September 23, 1926 – August 13, 2012) was the Austin B. Fletcher professor of philosophy at Tufts University. He is best known for his work on capital punishment.

A leading critic of the death penalty, Bedau has been quoted by Stuart Taylor Jr. as saying "I'll let the criminal justice system execute all the McVeighs they can capture, provided they'd sentence to prison all the people who are not like McVeigh."

== Career ==
Bedau received his undergraduate education at the naval training program at USC and at the University of Redlands, where he graduated in 1949. He completed his masters at Boston University in 1951 and his PhD from Harvard University in 1961. Bedau subsequently taught at Dartmouth College, Princeton University and Reed College before joining Tufts in 1966. He retired in 1999. Bedau was a founding member of the National Coalition to Abolish the Death Penalty, and served many years on its board of directors, including several as chairman. He was a member of the American Civil Liberties Union, for whom he wrote on the death penalty.

Bedau was the author of The Death Penalty in America (1st edition, 1964; 4th edition, 1997), The Courts, the Constitution, and Capital Punishment (1977), Death is Different (1987), and Killing as Punishment (2004), and co-author of In Spite of Innocence (1992). On the occasion of Bedau's retirement, Norman Daniels said of The Death Penalty in America: "It is the premier example in this century of the systematic application of academic philosophical skills to a practical issue, and the flood of work in practical ethics that has followed can rightfully cite Hugo's work as its starting point."

Bedau also published Civil Disobedience: Theory and Practice (Pegasus, 1969) and a later volume on the theory of civil disobedience.

== Personal life ==
Bedau married twice. His first marriage to Jan Mastin, by whom he had four children, including the philosopher Mark Bedau, ended in divorce. His second marriage, in 1990, was to Constance E. Putnam, a medical historian.

== See also ==
- American philosophy
- List of American philosophers

== General Reference ==
- Hugo A. Bedau Papers, 1954-2005. M.E. Grenander Department of Special Collections and Archives, University Libraries, University at Albany, State University of New York (hereafter referred to as the Bedau Papers).
