= Jeffrey Barrick =

21st-century American microbiologist

Jeffrey E. Barrick is a Hannah Distinguished Professor with a joint appointment in the Departments of Microbiology, Genetics & Immunology (MGI), and Entomology at Michigan State University (MSU). His research uses the tools of genomics, synthetic biology, and molecular biology to study the evolution of microorganisms, including symbionts of insects. Since 2022, Barrick has directed the E. coli Long-Term Evolution Experiment (LTEE), which has been underway since 1988.

== Education and research ==
Barrick received his undergraduate degree in Chemistry from Caltech in 2001, and he did a Ph.D. in Biochemistry and Biophysics at Yale, working with Ronald Breaker on riboswitches and other regulatory RNA motifs in bacteria. Barrick then did postdoctoral research at Michigan State University, where he worked with Richard Lenski on the LTEE and led the first whole-genome sequencing and analysis of the evolved bacterial samples. An accompanying commentary notes that "The complexity of the relationship between tempo and mode of evolution at the genomic and organismal levels is the cause of some unease, and suggests that caution needs to be exercised in inferring mode of organismal evolution from rates of evolution evident in DNA."

== Academic career ==
Barrick joined the faculty at UT Austin in 2011, becoming full professor in 2024.. In 2025, he moved his lab and the LTEE back to MSU were he was appointed as a Hannah Distinguished Professor at MGI, and the Entomology Departments. As of August 2024, Barrick has published over 100 scientific papers and has an h-index of 54.

In discussing the LTEE's future in 2015, Lenski, the founding director, proposed that "each successive scientist responsible for the LTEE would, ideally, be young enough that he or she could direct the project for 25 years or so, but senior enough to have been promoted and tenured based on his or her independent achievements in a relevant field (evolutionary biology, genomics, microbiology, etc.)". In 2022, Barrick was named the second director of the LTEE. In February 2025, he was elected as a Fellow of the American Academy of Microbiology.

== Research findings ==
Barrick has been a major contributor to the LTEE, including developing the breseq computational pipeline used to analyze whole-genome sequences from that project and other evolution experiments.

Barrick, Lenski, and colleagues identified mutations that allowed a seemingly inferior competitor to eventually prevail over a more-fit lineage in one LTEE population, demonstrating genetic differences in evolvability. Science writer Carl Zimmer compared the findings to a case of "Tortoise and Hare, in a Laboratory Flask". Barrick's team later identified mutations involved in the unexpected evolution of citrate utilization in another population. Zimmer explained that "[Barrick] and his colleagues developed a new method of engineering bacteria in order to identify the mutations that were absolutely essential for full-blown citrate feeding." He went on to say, however, that the relevant mutations "were weirdly few". Barrick's team subsequently discovered that this approach had missed another important mutation involved in citrate use because a later mutation—one involved in refining the new function—overrode the earlier mutation's effect.

In 2015, Barrick was co-recipient of an outstanding-paper award from the Genetics Society of America for a paper on clonal interference and frequency-dependent selection in the LTEE. In 2024, Barrick and collaborators discovered possible instances of de novo gene birth, involving the generation of novel mRNA transcripts and proteins associated with nearby mutations.

For several years, Barrick has also worked with bacterial endosymbionts of honey bees and other arthropods, with the aim of modifying the symbionts for beneficial applications. In 2020, Barrick, Nancy Moran, and colleagues genetically modified Snodgrassella alvi, a bacterial species that lives in the gut of honey bees, so that it induces an RNAi-mediated defense against a parasitic mite that carries a virus that is a major threat to the bees. A commentator noted that this "approach may not only provide a solution to many of the honey bee's woes, it also offers a new functional genomic toolkit with which to dissect the molecular intricacies of honey bees and their societies".
