= E. coli long-term evolution experiment =

Scientific study about E. coli

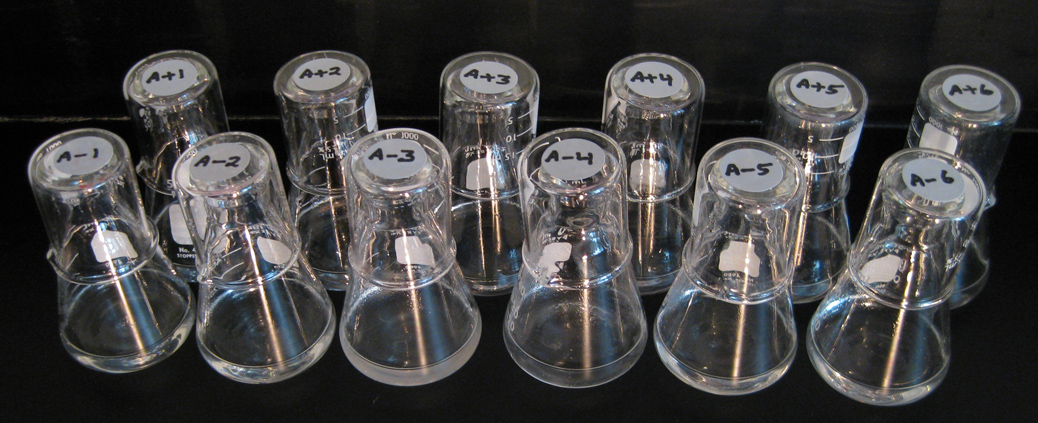
The 12 E. coli LTEE populations on June 25, 2008.

The E. coli long-term evolution experiment (LTEE) is an ongoing study in experimental evolution begun by Richard Lenski at the University of California, Irvine, carried on by Lenski and colleagues at Michigan State University, and currently overseen by Jeffrey Barrick at Michigan State University. It has been tracking genetic changes in 12 initially identical populations of asexual Escherichia coli bacteria since 24 February 1988. Lenski performed the 10,000th transfer of the experiment on March 13, 2017. The populations reached over 73,000 generations in early 2020, shortly before being frozen because of the COVID-19 pandemic. In September 2020, the LTEE experiment was resumed using the frozen stocks. When the populations reached 75,000 generations, the LTEE was transferred from the Lenski lab. In August 2024, the LTEE populations passed 80,000 generations in the Barrick lab.

Over the course of the experiment, Lenski and his colleagues have reported a wide array of phenotypic and genotypic changes in the evolving populations. These have included changes that have occurred in all 12 populations and others that have only appeared in one or a few populations. For example, all 12 populations showed a similar pattern of rapid improvement in fitness that decelerated over time, faster growth rates, and increased cell size. Half of the populations have evolved defects in DNA repair that have caused phenotypes marked by elevated mutation rates. The most notable adaptation reported so far is the evolution of aerobic growth on citrate, which is unusual in E. coli, in one population at some point between generations 31,000 and 31,500. However, E. coli usually does grow on citrate in anaerobic conditions and has an active citric acid cycle which can metabolize citrate even under aerobic conditions. The aerobic event is mainly an issue of citrate being able to enter the cell.

On May 4, 2020, Lenski announced a five-year renewal of the grant through the National Science Foundation's Long-Term Research in Environmental Biology (LTREB) Program that supports the LTEE. He also announced that Jeffrey Barrick, an associate professor of Molecular Biosciences at The University of Texas at Austin, would take over supervision of the experiment within the five-year funding period. The experiment's time at Michigan State University ended in May 2022, when the populations reached 75,000 generations but the experiment was revived and restarted in Barrick's lab on June 21, 2022.

In 2025, Barrick was hired by the Michigan State University Department of Microbiology, Genetics, and Immunology as a Hannah Distinguished Professor. In August of that year, his lab moved to MSU, bringing the LTEE back to Michigan.

== Experimental approach ==
The long-term evolution experiment was designed as an open-ended means of empirical examination of central features of evolution. The experiment was begun with three principal goals:

1. To examine the dynamics of evolution, including the rate of evolutionary change;
2. To examine the repeatability of evolution;
3. To better understand the relationship between change on the phenotypic and genotypic levels.

As the experiment has continued, its scope has grown as new questions in evolutionary biology have arisen that it can be used to address, as the populations' evolution has presented new phenomena to study, and as technology and methodological techniques have advanced.

The use of E. coli as the experimental organism has allowed many generations and large populations to be studied in a relatively short period of time. Moreover, due to the long use of E. coli as a principal model organism in molecular biology, a wide array of tools, protocols, and procedures were available for studying changes at the genetic, phenotypic, and physiological levels. The bacteria can also be frozen and preserved while remaining viable. This has permitted the creation of what Lenski describes as a "frozen fossil record" of samples of evolving populations that can be revived at any time. This frozen fossil record allows populations to be restarted in cases of contamination or other disruption in the experiment, and permits the isolation and comparison of living exemplars of ancestral and evolved clones. Lenski chose an E. coli strain that reproduces only asexually, lacks any plasmids that could permit bacterial conjugation, and has no viable prophage. As a consequence, evolution in the experiment occurs only by the core evolutionary processes of mutation, genetic drift, and natural selection. This strict asexuality also means that genetic markers persist in lineages and clades by common descent, but cannot otherwise spread in the populations.

Lenski chose to carry out the experiment with the bacteria grown in a glucose-limited medium called DM25, which is based on a minimal medium developed by Bernard Davis for use in isolating auxotrophic mutants of E. coli using penicillin as a selective agent. To make DM25, the minimal medium is supplemented with a low concentration (25 mg/L) of glucose. Lenski chose this concentration to simplify analysis of the populations' evolution by reducing clonal interference, in which multiple versions of alleles are competing in an evolving population, while also reducing the possibility of the evolution of ecological interactions. This concentration of glucose used supports a maximum population of 500 million cells of the ancestor in a 10 mL culture, though the maximum now varies among the evolved populations. DM25 also contains a large amount of citrate (about 11 times the concentration of glucose), which was originally included by Davis because it improved the killing efficiency of penicillin during his experiments, though it is now known to aid in E. coli's acquisition of iron from the medium.

=== Methods ===
The 12 populations are maintained in a 37 °C (99 °F) incubator in the Barrick laboratory at University of Texas at Austin. Each day, 1% of each population is transferred to a flask of fresh DM25 growth medium. The dilution means that each population experiences 6.64 generations, or doublings, each day. Large, representative samples of each population are frozen with glycerol as a cryoprotectant at 500-generation (75-day) intervals. The bacteria in these samples remain viable, and can be revived at any time. This collection of samples is referred to as the "frozen fossil record", and provides a history of the evolution of each population through the entire experiment. The populations are also regularly screened for changes in mean fitness, and supplemental experiments are regularly performed to study interesting developments in the populations. As of April 2016, the E. coli populations have been under study for over 64,500 generations, and are thought to have undergone enough spontaneous mutations that every possible single point mutation in the E. coli genome has occurred multiple times.

=== Founding strain ===
The strain of E. coli Lenski chose to use in the long-term evolution experiment was derived from "strain B", as described in a 1966 paper by Seymour Lederberg (which incorrectly identified the strain as "Bc251", although later genetic analysis found it to be "B" instead), via Bruce Levin, who had used it in a bacterial ecology experiment in 1972. The defining genetic traits of this strain were: T6^{r}, Str^{r}, r^{−}m^{−}, Ara^{−} (unable to grow on arabinose). Lenski designated the original founding strain as REL606. Before the beginning of the experiment, Lenski isolated an Ara^{+} variant of the strain in which a point mutation in the ara operon had restored growth on arabinose, which he designated as strain REL607. When beginning the long-term evolution experiment, Lenski founded six populations with six individual Ara^{−} colonies of REL606. These populations are referred to as Ara-1 through Ara-6. Lenski also founded six more populations from six individual Ara^{+} colonies of REL607. These are referred to as populations Ara+1 through Ara+6. The marker differences permit strains to be differentiated on Tetrazolium Arabinose plates, on which Ara^{−} colonies appear red, while Ara^{+} colonies appear white to pink. Over the course of the experiment, each population has accumulated a large number of distinct mutations, which permit further means of identifying strains by their population of origin.

== Results ==
=== Changes in fitness ===
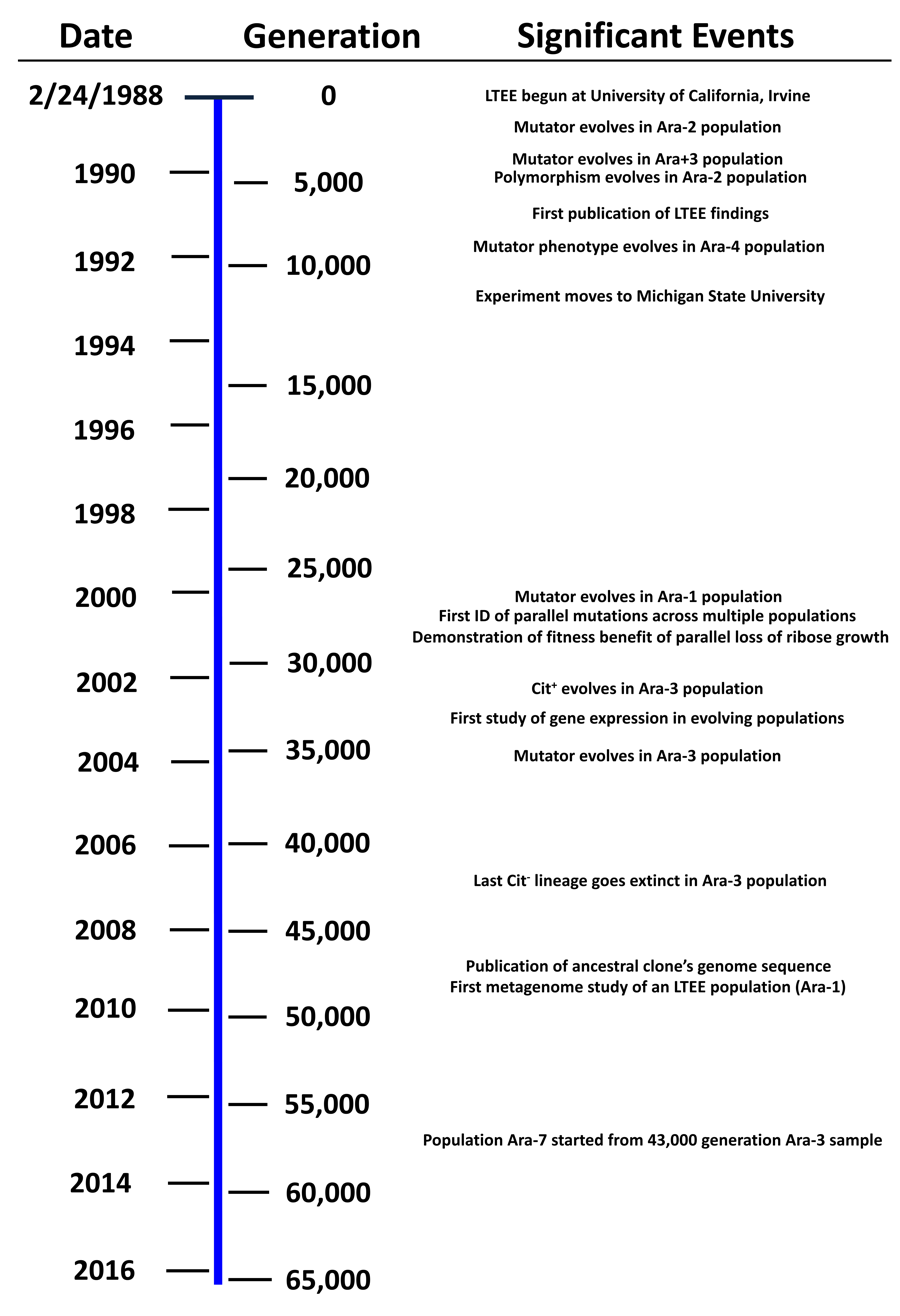
Timeline of the E. coli long-term evolution experiment, showing relationship between years and generations of evolution, as well as significant events and findings.

Much analysis of the experiment has dealt with how the fitness of the populations relative to their ancestral strain has changed. All populations showed a pattern of rapid increase in relative fitness during early generations, with this increase decelerating over time. By 20,000 generations the populations grew approximately 70% faster than the ancestral strain. This increase and deceleration in increase has continued in subsequent generations. A 2013 study by Wiser et al. reported ongoing improvement at 50,000 generations relative to samples isolated at 40,000 generations. They found that the fitness increase fit to a power law model much better than the hyperbolic models that had been used earlier. As a power law model describes an ever-slowing increase that has no upper limit, while a hyperbolic model implies a hard limit, the work suggested that the increase would continue without bound as progressively lower benefit mutations were fixed in the populations. Further work published in 2015 reported the results of over 1100 new fitness assays that examined fitness changes through 60,000 generations. The data once again fit the proposed power law model, and, indeed, fit within predictions of the model from earlier data. These results suggest that, contrary to previous thinking, adaptation and adaptive divergence can potentially increase indefinitely, even in a constant environment.

=== Genome evolution ===
Of the 12 populations, six have so far been reported to have developed defects in their ability to repair DNA, greatly increasing the rate of mutation in those strains. Although the bacteria in each population are thought to have generated hundreds of millions of mutations over the first 20,000 generations, Lenski has estimated that within this time frame, only 10 to 20 beneficial mutations achieved fixation in each population, with fewer than 100 total point mutations (including neutral mutations) reaching fixation in each population. In 2009, Barrick et al. reported the results of genome sequences from multiple time points in population Ara-1. They found that, unlike the declining rate of fitness improvement, mutation accumulation was linear and clock like, even though several lines of evidence suggested that much of the accumulation was beneficial, rather than neutral.

=== Evolution of increased cell size in all twelve populations ===
Growth in cell size of bacteria in the Lenski experiment

All twelve of the experimental populations show an increase in cell size concurrent with a decline in maximum population density, and in many of the populations, a more rounded cell shape. This change was partly the result of a mutation that changed the expression of a gene for a penicillin-binding protein, which allowed the mutant bacteria to outcompete ancestral bacteria under the conditions in the long-term evolution experiment. However, although this mutation increased fitness under these conditions, it also increased the bacteria's sensitivity to osmotic stress and decreased their ability to survive long periods in stationary phase cultures.

=== Ecological specialization ===
Over the course of the experiment, the populations have evolved to specialize on the glucose resource on which they grow. This was first described in 2000, when Cooper and Lenski demonstrated that all populations had experienced decay of unused metabolic functions after 20,000 generations, restricting the range of substances on which the bacteria could grow. Their analysis suggested that this decay was due to antagonistic pleiotropy, in which mutations that improved ability to grow on glucose had reduced or eliminated the ability to grow on other substances. A later study by Leiby and Marx that used more advanced techniques showed that much of the decay Cooper and Lenski had identified were experimental artifacts, that loss of unused functions was not as extensive as first thought, and that some unused functions had improved. Moreover, they concluded that the metabolic losses were not due to antagonistic pleiotropy, but the neutral accumulation of mutations in unused portions of the genome, suggesting that adaptation to a simple environment might not necessarily lead to specialization.

=== Evolution of balanced polymorphism and simple ecosystems ===
Two distinct variants, S and L, were identified in the population designated Ara-2 at 18,000 generations based on their formation of small and large colonies, respectively. Clones of the S and L types could co-exist stably in co-culture with each other, indicating they occupied distinct niches in the population. This was verified by the finding that the L type had an advantage during growth on glucose, but that S had an advantage during stationary phase, after glucose had run out. The two types were found to have initially evolved prior to 6,000 generations, and then co-existed thereafter. Phylogenetic analysis of clones of the two types isolated from different generations demonstrated that the S and L types belonged to distinct, co-existing lineages in the population, and might be undergoing incipient speciation.

=== Evidence of de novo gene birth ===
De novo gene birth is the process by which new genes arise by mutations that impact stretches of previously non-coding DNA. However, it is generally difficult to observe instances of gene birth. By analyzing the large collection of whole-genome sequences of E. coli clones sampled from the LTEE populations, a 2024 study discovered several possible instances of gene birth that involved the generation of novel mRNA transcripts and proteins associated with nearby mutations. The functional roles, if any, of these new proto-genes remain unknown.

=== Evolution of aerobic citrate usage in one population ===
==== Background ====
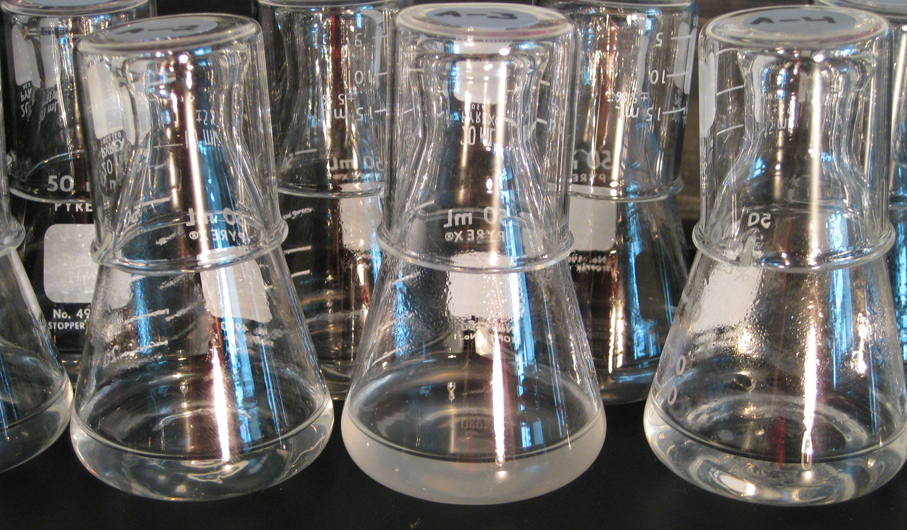
The population designated Ara-3 (center) is more turbid because that population evolved to use the citrate present in the growth medium.

E. coli is normally unable to grow aerobically on citrate due to the inability to express a citrate transporter when oxygen is present. However, E. coli has a complete citric acid cycle, and therefore metabolizes citrate as an intermediate during aerobic growth on other substances, including glucose. Most E. coli can grow anaerobically on citrate via fermentation, if a co-substrate such as glucose is available to provide reducing power. The anaerobic growth is possible due to the expression of a transmembrane citrate-succinate antiporter gene, citT, which was first identified in 1998. This gene is co-regulated with other genes involved in citrate fermentation found on the cit operon, which is turned on only when oxygen is absent.

The inability to grow aerobically on citrate, referred to as a Cit^{−} phenotype, is considered a defining characteristic of E. coli as a species, and one that has been a valuable means of differentiating E. coli from pathogenic Salmonella. Although Cit^{+} strains of E. coli have been isolated from environmental and agricultural samples, in every such case, the trait was found to be due to the presence of a plasmid that carries a foreign citrate transporter. A single, spontaneous Cit^{+} mutant of E. coli was reported by Hall in 1982. This mutant had been isolated during prolonged selection for growth on another novel substance in a growth broth that also contained citrate. Hall's genetic analysis indicated the underlying mutation was complex, but he was ultimately unable to identify the precise changes or genes involved, leading him to hypothesize activation of a cryptic transporter gene. The genome regions to which Hall was able to narrow down the locations of the changes do not correspond to the known location of the citT gene identified 16 years later, nor did the physiological characteristics in transport assays of Hall's Cit^{+} mutants match those to be expected for aerobic expression of the CitT transporter.

==== Cit^{+} evolves in the LTEE ====
In 2008, Lenski's team, led by Zachary D. Blount, reported that the ability to grow aerobically on citrate had evolved in one population. Around generation 33,127, a dramatic increase in turbidity was observed in the population designated Ara-3. They found that the population contained clones that were able to grow aerobically on citrate (Cit^{+}). This metabolic capacity permitted the population to grow several-fold larger than it had previously, due to the large amount of citrate present in the medium. Examination of frozen fossil samples of the populations showed that Cit^{+} clones could be isolated as early as 31,500 generations. The Cit^{+} variants in the population were found to possess a number of genetic markers unique to the Ara-3 population; this observation excluded the possibility that the clones were contaminants, rather than spontaneous mutants. In a series of experiments that "replayed" the tape of Ara-3 evolution from Cit^{−} clones isolated from samples frozen at various time points in the population's history, they demonstrated that the ability to grow aerobically on citrate was more likely to re-evolve in a subset of genetically pure, evolved clones. In these experiments, they observed 19 new, independent instances of Cit^{+} re-evolution, but only when starting from clones isolated from after generation 20,000. Fluctuation tests showed that clones from this generation and later displayed a rate of mutation to the Cit^{+} trait which was significantly higher than the ancestral rate. Even in these later clones, the rate of mutation to Cit^{+} was on the order of one occurrence per trillion cell divisions.

Lenski and his colleagues concluded that the evolution of the Cit^{+} function in this one population arose due to one or more earlier, possibly nonadaptive, "potentiating" mutations that increased the rate of mutation to an accessible level. The data suggested that citrate usage involved at least two mutations subsequent to these "potentiating" mutations. More generally, the authors suggest these results indicate, following the argument of Stephen Jay Gould, "that historical contingency can have a profound and lasting impact" on the course of evolution. These findings have come to be considered a significant instance of the impact of historical contingency on evolution.

==== Genomic analysis of the Cit^{+} trait and implications for evolutionary innovation ====
The Cit^{+} trait was actualized by a duplication mutation that created a new regulatory module by placing a copy of the citT gene that encodes a citrate-succinate antiporter under the control of a promoter that supports expression under aerobic conditions. This mutation results in the CitT transporter being expressed when oxygen is present, permitting growth on citrate.

In 2012, Lenski and his team reported the results of a genomic analysis of the Cit^{+} trait that shed light on the genetic basis and evolutionary history of the trait. The researchers had sequenced the entire genomes of twenty-nine clones isolated from various time points in the Ara-3 population's history. They used these sequences to reconstruct the phylogenetic history of the population; this reconstruction showed that the population had diversified into three clades by 20,000 generations. The Cit^{+} variants had evolved in one of these, which they called Clade 3. Clones that had been found to be potentiated in earlier research were distributed among all three clades, but were over-represented in Clade 3. This led the researchers to conclude that there had been at least two potentiating mutations involved in Cit^{+} evolution.

The researchers also found that all Cit^{+} clones had mutations in which a 2933-base-pair segment of DNA was duplicated or amplified. The duplicated segment contained the gene citT for the citrate transporter protein used in anaerobic growth on citrate. The duplication is tandem, and resulted in copies that were head-to-tail with respect to each other. This new configuration placed a copy of the previously silent, unexpressed citT under the control of the adjacent rnk gene's promoter, which directs expression when oxygen is present. This new rnk-citT module produced a novel regulatory pattern for citT, activating expression of the citrate transporter when oxygen was present, and thereby enabled aerobic growth on citrate.

Movement of this rnk-citT module into the genome of a potentiated Cit^{−} clone was shown to be sufficient to produce a Cit^{+} phenotype. However, the initial Cit^{+} phenotype conferred by the duplication was very weak, and only granted a ~1% fitness benefit. The researchers found that the number of copies of the rnk-citT module had to be increased to strengthen the Cit^{+} trait sufficiently to permit the bacteria to grow well on the citrate. Further mutations after the Cit^{+} bacteria became dominant in the population continued to accumulate improved growth on citrate.

The researchers concluded that the evolution of the Cit^{+} trait occurred in three distinct phases: (1) mutations accumulated that increased the rate of mutation to Cit^{+}, (2) the trait itself appeared in a weak form, and (3) the trait was improved by later mutations. Blount et al. suggested that this pattern might be typical of how novel traits in general evolve, and proposed a three-step model of evolutionary innovation:

1. Potentiation: a genetic background evolves in which a trait is mutationally accessible, making the trait's evolution possible.
2. Actualization: a mutation occurs that produces the trait, making it manifest, albeit likely in a weak form.
3. Refinement: Once the trait exists, if it provides selective benefit, mutations will accumulate that improve the trait, making it effective. This phase is open-ended, and will continue so long as refining mutations arise and the trait remains beneficial.

This model has seen acceptance in evolutionary biology. In 2015 paleontologist Douglas Erwin suggested a modification to a four-step model to better reflect a possible distinction between evolutionary novelty and evolutionary innovation, and to highlight the importance of environmental conditions: potentiation, generation of novel phenotypes (actualization), adaptive refinement, and exploitation (conversion of a novelty to an innovation as it becomes important for the ecological establishment of possessing organisms).

==== Investigation of potentiation ====
In 2014, a research team led by Eric Quandt in the lab of Jeffrey Barrick at the University of Texas at Austin described the application of a new technique called Recursive Genomewide Recombination and Sequencing (REGRES) to identify potentiating mutations among the 70 present in the Ara-3 lineage that evolved Cit^{+}. This method used multiple rounds of a process in which F plasmid based conjugation between a 33,000 generation Cit^{+} clone, CZB154, and the Cit^{−} founding clone of the LTEE to purge mutations not required for either manifestation of a weak or strong form of the Cit^{+} trait, the latter referred to as Cit^{++}. They found that the rnk-citT module responsible for the phenotypic switch to Cit^{+} was sufficient to produce a weak Cit^{+} phenotype in the ancestor. They also identified a mutation that had occurred in the lineage leading to CZB154 after the initial evolution of Cit^{+} that conferred a strong, Cit^{++} phenotype in the ancestor absent any mutation but the rnk-citT module. This mutation, found in the regulatory region of a gene called dctA, caused a massive increase in the expression of the DctA transporter, which functions to import C_{4}-dicarboxylates into the cell. This increased DctA expression, they found, permitted Cit^{+} cells to re-uptake succinate, malate, and fumarate released into the medium by the CitT transporter during import of citrate. They identified a similar mutation in Cit^{++} clones in the Ara-3 population that increased DctA expression by restoring function to a gene that regulates it, dcuS, that had been deactivated in the ancestral clone. Quandt et al. concluded that the dctA mutation was not involved in potentiation, but refinement. This led them to suggest that evolution of Cit^{+} in the Ara-3 population might have been contingent upon a genetic background and population-specific ecology that permitted the early, weak Cit^{+} variants to persist in the population long enough for refining mutations to arise and render growth on citrate strong enough to provide a significant fitness benefit.

Quandt and colleagues later published findings definitively identifying a mutation that did potentiate Cit^{+} evolution. This mutation was in the gltA gene, which encodes citrate synthase, an enzyme involved in the flow of carbon into the citric acid cycle. It had the effect of increasing citrate synthase activity, and they showed that it permitted improved growth on acetate. Moreover, with the gltA mutation, the rnk-citT module that causes the Cit^{+} trait has a neutral-to-slightly beneficial fitness effect, while, without it, the module was strongly detrimental. The gltA mutation therefore seems to have permitted early, weak Cit^{+} variants to persist in the population until later refining mutations could occur, consistent with their earlier conclusions. After a strong Cit^{++} phenotype evolved, the increased citrate synthase activity became detrimental. The researchers found that later mutations in gltA countered the first mutation, reducing citrate synthase activity, and further improving growth on citrate. They concluded that the series of mutations in gltA first potentiated, and then refined growth on citrate. They also suggested that the lineage in which Cit^{+} arose might have occupied a niche in Ara-3 based on growth on acetate, and that the potentiating mutations that led to evolution of Cit^{+} in Ara-3 were originally adaptive for acetate use.

==== Investigation of post-Cit^{+} ecology and persistent diversity ====
A small subpopulation of Cit^{−} cells unable to grow on citrate, and belonging to a separate clade persisted in the population after the Cit^{+} cells became dominant. Early findings showed that this diversity was partly due to the Cit^{−} cells being better at growing on the glucose in the medium. Turner et al. later found that another factor behind the coexistence was that the Cit^{−} cells evolved the ability to cross feed on the Cit^{+} majority. They showed that the Cit^{+} cells release succinate, malate, and fumarate during growth on citrate, as the CitT transporter pumps these substances out of the cell while pumping citrate into the cell. The Cit^{−} cells had rapidly evolved the ability to grow on these substances due to a mutation that restored expression of an appropriate transporter protein that was silent in the ancestor.

The Cit^{−} subpopulation eventually went extinct in the population between 43,500 and 44,000 generations. This extinction was shown to not be due to the Cit^{+} majority evolving to be able to invade the niche occupied by the Cit^{−} minority. Indeed, Cit^{−} clones could invade Cit^{+} populations from after the extinction event. Moreover, in an experiment in which they restarted twenty replicates of the Ara-3 population from the sample frozen 500 generations before the extinction, Turner et al. found that the Cit^{−} subpopulation had not gone extinct in any of the replicates after 500 generations of evolution. One of these replicates was continued for 2,500 generations, over which Cit^{−} continued to coexist. The researchers concluded that the extinction of Cit^{−} had been due to some unknown "rare environmental perturbation", similar to that which can impact natural populations. The final replicate was integrated into the main LTEE experiment, becoming the thirteenth population, Ara-7.

==== Various interpretations of the findings ====
Barry Hall had already isolated a mutant strain of aerobic citrate-utilizing E. coli in 1982 and he attributed it to two mutations in genes citA and citB, which are linked to the gal operon. Some have contrasted Hall's findings as unintended "direct selection" for Cit+ mutants and Lenski's findings as an unintended genetic "screen" for Cit+ mutants. Other researchers have experimented on evolving aerobic citrate-utilizing E. coli. Dustin Van Hofwegen et al. were able to isolate 46 independent citrate-utilizing mutants of E. coli in just 12 to 100 generations using highly prolonged selection under starvation, during which the bacteria would sample more mutations more rapidly. In their research, the genomic DNA sequencing revealed an amplification of the citT and dctA loci, and rearrangement of DNA were the same class of mutations identified in the experiment by Richard Lenski and his team. They concluded that the rarity of the citrate-utilizing mutant in Lenski's research was likely a result of the selective experimental conditions used by his team rather than being a unique evolutionary speciation event.

John Roth and Sophie Maisnier-Patin reviewed the approaches in both the Lenski team's delayed mutations and the Van Hofwegen team's rapid mutations on E. coli. They argue that both teams observed the same sequence of potentiation, actualization, and refinement leading up to similar Cit^{+} variants. According to them, Lenski's period of less than a day during which citrate usage would be under selection, followed by 100-fold dilution, and a period of growth on glucose that would not select for citrate use; ultimately lowered the probability of E. coli being able to accumulate early adaptive mutations from one period of selection to the next. In contrast, Van Hofwegen's team allowed for a continuous selection period of 7 days, which yielded a more rapid development of citrate-using E. coli. Roth and Maisnier-Patin suggest that the serial dilution of E. coli and short period of selection for citrate use under the conditions of the LTEE perpetually impeded each generation of E. coli from reaching the next stages of aerobic citrate utilization.

Lenski argues that the problem is not with the experiments or the data, but with the interpretations made by Van Hofwegen et al. and Maisnier-Patin and Roth. According to him, the rapid evolution of Cit^{+} was not necessarily unexpected since his team was also able to produce multiple Cit^{+} mutants in a few weeks during the replay experiments. He argues that the LTEE was not designed to isolate citrate-using mutants or to deal with speciation, which is a process, not an event. Furthermore, he argued that the evolution of Cit^{+} in the LTEE was contingent upon mutations that had accumulated earlier.

== See also ==
- Experimental evolution
- Long-term experiment
