= Charles Ofria =

American computer scientist

- Born: December 13, 1973 (age 52); New York, NY (United States)
- Education: Stony Brook University (B.S., 1994); California Institute of Technology (Ph.D., 1999)
- Known for: Digital evolution, Avida
- Awards: Withrow Distinguished Scholar Award (2006, 2016); NSF CAREER Award (2007); Withrow Teaching Excellence Award (2010)
- Scientific career
- Fields: Computer Science, Evolutionary Biology
- Workplaces: Michigan State University
- Doctoral advisor: Christoph Adami
- Other academic advisors: Richard Lenski
- Website: www.ofria.com

Charles A. Ofria is a professor in the Department of Computer Science and Engineering at Michigan State University. He is the director of the Digital Evolution (DEvo) Lab and the BEACON Center for the Study of Evolution in Action.

== Early life and education ==
Ofria is the son of the late Charles Ofria, who developed the first fully integrated shop management program for the automotive repair industry. He attended Stuyvesant High School and graduated from Ward Melville High School in 1991. He earned a B.S. in Computer Science, Pure Mathematics, and Applied Mathematics from Stony Brook University in 1994. He completed a Ph.D. in Computation and Neural Systems at the California Institute of Technology in 1999.

== Career ==
His research focuses on the relationship between computer science and Darwinian evolution. He is one of the original designers of Avida, an artificial life software platform used to study the evolutionary biology of self-replicating digital organisms. Avida was initially developed at Caltech in 1993 by Ofria, Chris Adami and C. Titus Brown and remains under active development in his Digital Evolution Lab at Michigan State University.

== Awards and recognition ==
Ofria has received several awards, including:

- NSF CAREER Award (2007)
- Withrow Excellence Award for Teaching (2010) and Research (2006, 2016)
- William J. Beal Outstanding Faculty Award (2017)
- Fellow of the American Association for the Advancement of Science (2022)

== Selected publications ==
=== Journal articles ===
- Clune J, Pennock RT, Ofria C, Lenski RE (2012) Ontogeny tends to recapitulate phylogeny in digital organisms" The American Naturalist 180: E54–E63. (pdf)
- Clune J, Goldsby HJ, Ofria C, and Pennock RT (2011) Selective pressures for accurate altruism targeting: Evidence from digital evolution for difficult-to-test aspects of inclusive fitness theory. Proceedings of the Royal Society. 278: 666–674. (PDF)
- Clune J, Stanley KO, Pennock RT, Ofria C (2011) On the performance of indirect encoding across the continuum of regularity. IEEE Transactions on Evolutionary Computation. 15(3): 346–367. (PDF)
- Clune J, Misevic D, Ofria C, Lenski RE, Elena SF, and Sanjuán R. Natural selection fails to optimize mutation rates for long-term adaptation on rugged fitness landscapes
- Ofria C, Huang W and Torng E. On the gradual evolution of complexity and the sudden emergence of complex features
- Elena SF, Wilke CO, Ofria C, and Lenski RE. Effects of population size and mutation rate on the evolution of mutational robustness
- Ostrowski E, Ofria C, and Lenski RE, Ecological specialization and adaptive decay in digital organisms
- Lenski RE, Barrick JE, Ofria C. Balancing Robustness and Evolvability
- Misevic D, Ofria C, and Lenski RE. Sexual reproduction reshapes the genetic architecture of digital organisms

=== Publications on Avida ===
- R. E. Lenski, C. Ofria, T. C. Collier, C. Adami (1999). Genomic Complexity, Robustness, and Genetic Interactions in Digital Organisms. Nature 400:661-664. Abstract
- C. Adami, C. Ofria, and T.C. Collier (2000). Evolution of biological complexity. "Proceedings of the National Academy of Sciences" 97:4463-4468. Abstract
- C. O. Wilke, J. L. Wang, C. Ofria, R. E. Lenski, and C. Adami (2001). Evolution of Digital Organisms at High Mutation Rate Leads To Survival of the Flattest. Nature 412:331-333 Abstract.
- R. E. Lenski, C. Ofria, R. T. Pennock, and C. Adami (2003). The Evolutionary Origin of Complex Features. Nature 423:139-145. Abstract
- S.S. Chow, C.O. Wilke, C. Ofria, R. E. Lenski, and C. Adami (2004). Adaptive Radiation from Resource Competition in Digital Organisms. Science 305:84-86 Abstract.
