= Artificial creation =

Artificial creation is a field of research that studies the primary synthesis of complex lifelike structures from primordial lifeless origins.

The field bears some similarity to artificial life, but unlike artificial life, artificial creation focuses on the primary emergence of complex structures and processes of abiogenesis. Artificial creation does not rely exclusively on the application of evolutionary computation and genetic algorithms to optimize artificial creatures or grow synthetic life forms. Artificial creation instead studies systems of rules of interaction, initial conditions and primordial building blocks that can generate complex lifelike structures, based exclusively on repeated application of rules of interaction.

An essential difference that distinguishes artificial creation from other related fields is that no explicit fitness function is used to select for fit structures. Structures exist based only on their ability to persist as entities that do not violate the system's rules of interaction. Artificial creation studies the way in which complex emergent properties can arise to form a self-organizing system.

== Origins ==
Although concepts and elements of artificial creation are represented to some degree in many areas, the field itself is less than a decade old. There are models of self-organizing systems that produce emergent properties in biology, computer science, mathematics, engineering and other fields. Artificial creation differs from these in that it focuses on underlying properties of systems that can generate the endless environmentally interactive complexity of living systems.

One of the primary impetuses for the exploration of artificial creation comes from the realization in the artificial life and evolutionary computing fields that some basic assumptions common in these fields represent subtle mischaracterizations of natural evolution. These fall into two general classes: 1) there are fundamental problems with the use of fitness functions for the primary synthesis of complex systems, and 2) the process of self-replication used in almost all artificial life research is not a fundamental property of self-organizing systems.

== Issues ==
The concept of a fitness function (or objective function) is central to artificial life systems. The fitness function is used to drive a given artificial evolution process to create synthetic organisms capable of performing a given task. However, fitness functions, even aggregate high-level ones, drive evolving systems to particular solutions and place a ceiling on innovation and complexity. Natural evolution does not drive organisms toward particular solutions to problems. There is no motive force for evolution in our universe beyond that of adherence to physical law. This is a subtle point: when modern organisms are viewed in a local context it does appear that they are evolving to optimize particular abilities that will help them survive. This is not the case in a global sense. In fact, the pressure to optimize a given ability comes from the current state of a given population. The only fundamental selective pressure is the ability of structures to adhere to physical law. Stochastic events initiated the appearance of features that we might view as adaptive traits, and it is the local evolution of these traits that much of evolutionary theory is based upon.

The universe maintains its own consistency. However, when trying to model the universe, or create artificial organisms by mimicking natural evolution, the application of fitness functions that select for particular abilities force an unnatural bias onto the evolving organisms.

In evolutionary biology, it is well understood that all properties of organisms and ecosystems are emergent properties of fundamental physical law. The conceptual problems related to generations, offspring and populations that occur in artificial life systems stem from the fact that self-replication is itself an innovation of life on Earth. The dynamics observed in modern self-replicating life forms on Earth are extremely complex emergent properties of the organisms themselves, not driving forces imposed by an external controlling entity.

== Conferences ==
- Alife: http://alife.org/conferences
- GECCO: http://www.sigevo.org/gecco-2016/
