= Kay E. Holekamp =

American behavioral biologist

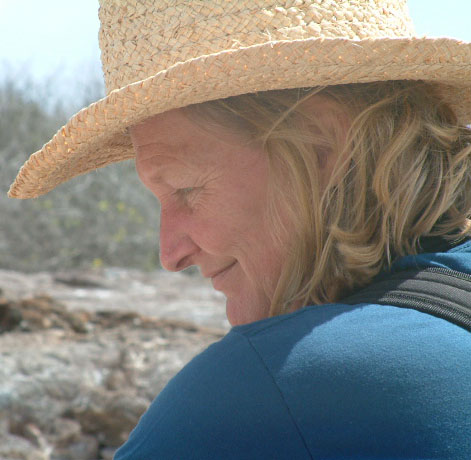
- Kay Holekamp in 2011
- Education: Smith College; University of California, Berkeley
- Known for: Mara Hyena Project
- Awards: David and Lucile Packard Foundation Fellow (1993) Animal Behavior Society Fellow (2001); American Association for the Advancement of Science Fellowship (2013); Guggenheim Fellowship (2006) American Society of Mammalogists C. Hart Merriam Award (2005); Smith College Medal (2013); American Academy of Arts and Sciences Fellow (2015) Animal Behavior Society Lifetime Achievement Award (2019)
- Scientific career
- Fields: Behavioral Biology
- Workplaces: University of California, Santa Cruz; Michigan State University
- Thesis: (1983)
- Doctoral advisor: Steven E. Glickman and Roy L. Caldwell
- Website: www.holekamplab.org

Kay E. Holekamp is a University Distinguished Professor in the Department of Integrative Biology at Michigan State University (MSU). She is also a core member of the interdisciplinary program in Ecology, Evolution, and Behavior (EEB) at MSU, and she served as Director of that program from 2009 to 2020.

== Education ==
Holekamp received her undergraduate degree in 1973 in Biological Psychology from Smith College, where she wrote her honors thesis on the behavior of Linnaeus's mouse opossum (Marmosa Murina). After a stint working as a river guide in Amazonas and hitchhiking around the world, Holekamp earned her PhD in psychobiology in 1983 at the University of California, Berkeley.

Holekamp's doctoral dissertation research, conducted under the supervision of Stephen E. Glickman and Roy L. Caldwell, focused on the sexually dimorphic natal dispersal behavior of Belding's ground squirrel (Urocitellus beldingi, formerly Spermophilus beldingi). In her postdoctoral work in behavioral endocrinology with Frank Talamantes at the University of California, Santa Cruz, Holekamp studied the reproductive endocrinology of California ground squirrels (Otospermophilus beecheyi, formerly Spermophilus beecheyi)

== Early life ==
Holekamp is the eldest of four children born to Carl H. Holekamp Jr. and Barbara Brown Holekamp. Holekamp was raised in St. Louis, Missouri, where she attended the John Burroughs School from 1963 to 1969. During her senior year of high school, she initiated her career in animal behavior by working part-time as a keeper in the Children's Zoo and Small Mammal Division at the St. Louis Zoo.

After graduating from Smith College, Holekamp worked as an Amazon river guide at the Parador Ticuna Hotel (now the Hotel Utuane) in Leticia, Colombia, until starting her doctoral work at U.C. Berkeley.

== Scientific career ==
In 1987, Holekamp joined the Department of Ornithology and Mammalogy as a research associate at San Francisco's California Academy of Sciences. There, in May 1988, she initiated her long-term field study of the behavioral ecology of spotted hyenas (Crocuta crocuta) in the Maasai Mara National Reserve, Kenya. Holekamp joined the faculty of the Department of Zoology (now the Department of Integrative Biology) at Michigan State University in 1992. There, Holekamp and her students continued her field study of spotted hyenas with a particular focus on their behavioral and morphological development.

She was named a University Distinguished Professor in 1999. Her hyena research has received continuous funding from the U.S. National Science Foundation since 1987.

== Awards ==
Holekamp was awarded a fellowship from the David and Lucile Packard Foundation in 1993. She was elected as a Fellow of the Animal Behavior Society in 2001, and received the C. Hart Merriam Award for outstanding research in mammalogy from the American Society of Mammalogists in 2005. In 2006, she received a Guggenheim Fellowship. In 2013, Holekamp was elected as a Fellow of the American Association for the Advancement of Science, and she was also awarded the Smith College Medal. She was inducted as a Fellow of the American Academy of Arts and Sciences in 2015. In 2016, she was elected by the American Society of Mammalogists to Honorary Membership, which is the Society's highest honor. Holekamp was also the recipient of the Distinguished Animal Behaviorist Award from the Animal Behavior Society, a lifetime achievement award and that Society's highest honor, in 2019.

== Research ==
=== Ground squirrels ===
Holekamp studied the proximal factors influencing dispersal from the natal site by Belding's ground squirrels in the Sierra Nevada of California. Holekamp's data supported an "ontogenetic switch" hypothesis, suggesting that natal dispersal behavior by male squirrels is triggered by attainment of a particular body mass or body composition, or some combination of these variables. Holekamp also tested hypotheses about the endocrine mediation of natal dispersal, finding that the behavior was mediated by organizational effects of androgenic hormones.

Later, Holekamp's first PhD student, Scott Nunes, found that perinatal exposure to testosterone determines the probability of dispersal, whereas the amount of energy a ground squirrel has stored as fat strongly influences the timing of its dispersal. Together with P. W. Sherman, Holekamp summarized her work on natal dispersal in a 1989 paper published in American Scientist that addressed the question of why male ground squirrels disperse at all four levels of analysis suggested by Niko Tinbergen.

=== Spotted hyenas ===
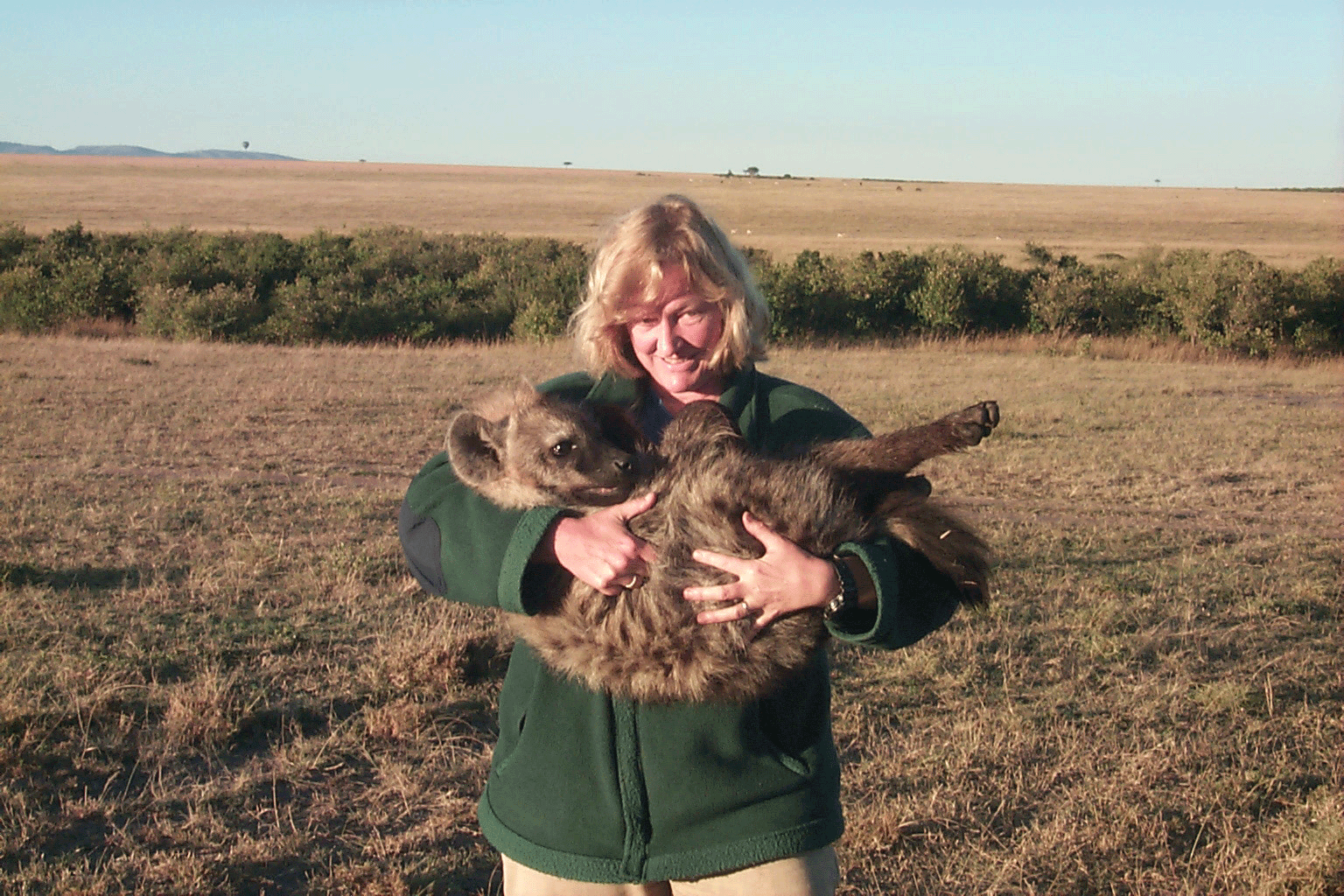
Kay Holekamp in the Masai Mara National Reserve.

From 1988 until 2025, Holekamp served as Director of the Mara Hyena Project, a long-term field study of free-living spotted hyenas in southwestern Kenya. Her early hyena work, conducted in collaboration with Laura Smale, addressed the question of how females come to dominate males during the course of their early social development. Holekamp and Smale found that young hyenas of both sexes assume social ranks immediately below those of their mothers, and that females only come to dominate males when males disperse from their natal social group. Holekamp and her students went on to study social rank and reproductive success, hunting success, behavioral and hormonal changes associated with natal dispersal behavior, and mating strategies in spotted hyenas.

Together with S.M. Dloniak and J. A. French, Holekamp found that both male and female cubs born to mothers with high concentrations of androgens during late pregnancy exhibit higher rates of aggression than cubs born to mothers with lower androgen concentrations. Because spotted hyenas live in social groups of the same size and structure as troops of many old-world primates, Holekamp and her students used spotted hyenas as a model system for testing hypotheses about the evolution of large brains and enhanced intelligence. Holekamp and her students have also made contributions elucidating the immune function of spotted hyenas, their microbiome, their conservation and management, their cooperative defense of resources, and their social dynamics.
