= David Barrick =

English cricketer (born 1984)

Personal information
- Full name: David James Barrick
- Born: 4 April 1984 (age 42); Pontefract, Yorkshire, England
- Batting: Right-handed
- Bowling: Leg break googly

Domestic team information
- Years: Team
- 2005–2006: Durham
- 2004–2006: Northumberland

Career statistics
Competition	List A	Twenty20
Matches	1	2
Runs scored	24	9
Batting average	–	4.50
100s/50s	–/–	–/–
Top score	24*	7
Balls bowled	30	42
Wickets	–	2
Bowling average	–	32.50
5 wickets in innings	–	–
10 wickets in match	–	–
Best bowling	–	2/34
Catches/stumpings	1/–	–/–
- Source: Cricinfo, 9 August 2011

David James Barrick (born 4 January 1984) is an English cricketer. Barrick is a right-handed batsman who bowls leg break googly. He was born in Pontefract, Yorkshire.

Barrick made his debut in county cricket for Northumberland in 2004 against Cambridgeshire in the Minor Counties Championship. He played Minor counties cricket for Northumberland from 2004 to 2006, making 3 Minor Counties Championship appearances and 2 MCCA Knockout Trophy appearances. In 2005, he made his debut for Durham in a List A match against Bangladesh A. In his only List A match for Durham, he bowled 5 wicket-less overs and scored 24 unbeaten runs. The following season, Barrick played 2 Twenty20 matches in the Twenty20 Cup against Derbyshire and Leicestershire. In the match against Derbyshire, he bowled 3 wicket-less overs, while with the bat he was dismissed for 7 runs by Graeme Welch. Against Leicestershire, he took the wickets of Paul Nixon and Paul Harrison for the cost of 34 runs from 4 overs. With the bat, he was dismissed for 2 runs by Stuart Broad. Barrick made no further appearances for Durham and has not appeared in first-class cricket.
