= Mark Bedau =

American philosopher

Mark A. Bedau is an American philosopher who works in the field of artificial life. He is the son of the philosopher Hugo Bedau (1926–2012). Mark Bedau earned his B.A. in philosophy at Reed College in 1977, and his Ph.D. in Philosophy from U.C. Berkeley in 1985.

Bedau currently teaches at Reed College. He is also the co-founder of the European Center for Living Technology (ECLT) and Visiting Professor, Ph.D. Program in Life Sciences: Foundations and Ethics, European School of Molecular Medicine. Bedau is also the editor of the Artificial Life Journal.

He has been the COO of Protolife, a biotechnology start-up based in Venice, Italy.

== Recent books ==
- M. A. Bedau and E. C. Parke, eds. The prospect of protocells: social and ethical implications of the recreation of life. Cambridge: MIT Press. 2009.
- Mark A. Bedau, Carol E. Cleland, eds. The Nature of Life: Classical and Contemporary Perspectives from Philosophy. 2011.
- Mark A. Bedau and Paul Humphreys, eds. Emergence: contemporary readings in philosophy and science. Cambridge: MIT Press, 2008.
- Mark. A Bedau, George Myro, and Tim Monroe, eds. Rudiments of Logic. 1987.
