= Richard Lenski =

American evolutionary biologist

Richard E. Lenski
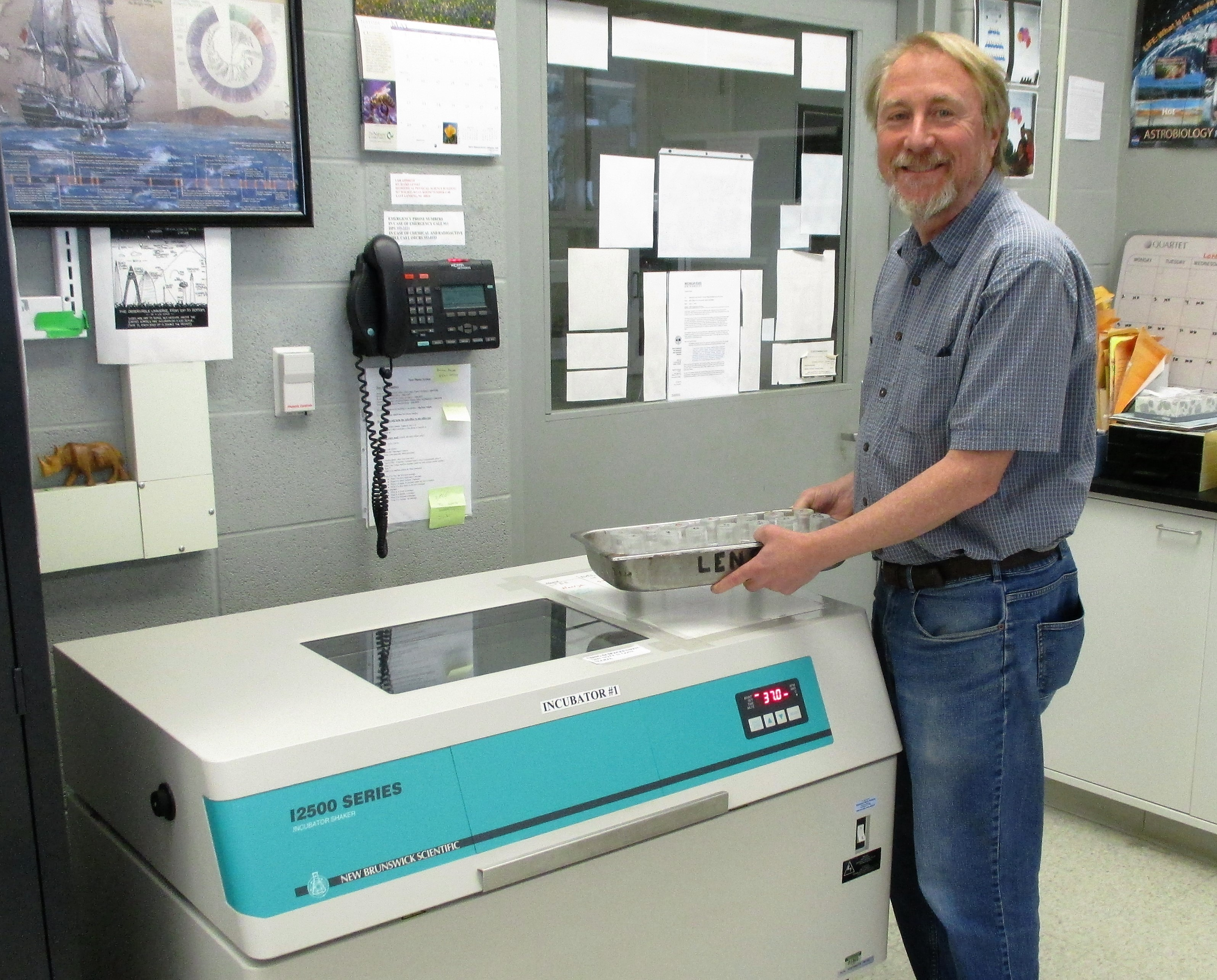
- Richard Lenski with Long-Term Flasks and Incubator on May 26, 2016
- Born: August 13, 1956 (age 70)
- Education: University of North Carolina, Chapel Hill; Oberlin College
- Known for: E. coli long-term evolution experiment
- Parents: Gerhard Lenski (father); Jean Lenski (mother)
- Relatives: Richard C. H. Lenski (great-grandfather), Lois Lenski (great-aunt)
- Awards: NCSE Friend of Darwin Award (2017); Sewall Wright Award (2012); MacArthur Fellowship (1996); Guggenheim Fellowship (1991)
- Scientific career
- Fields: Evolutionary biology Experimental evolution Microbiology
- Institutions: Michigan State University; University of California, Irvine
- Thesis: Effects of competition and disturbance on ground beetle populations (1982)
- Doctoral advisor: Nelson Hairston
- Other academic advisors: Bruce Levin (Postdoctoral Mentor)
- Doctoral students: Paul E. Turner; Zachary Blount; Michael Travisano
- Website: lenski.mmg.msu.edu telliamedrevisited.wordpress.com the-ltee.org

Richard E. Lenski (born 1956) is an American evolutionary biologist who is the John A. Hannah Distinguished Professor of Microbial Ecology at Michigan State University. He is a member of the National Academy of Sciences and a MacArthur Fellow. Lenski is best known for his still ongoing 38-year-old long-term E. coli evolution experiment, which has been instrumental in understanding the core processes of evolution, including mutation rates, clonal interference, antibiotic resistance, the evolution of novel traits, and speciation. He is also well known for his pioneering work in studying evolution digitally using self-replicating organisms called Avida.

== Early life ==
Richard Lenski is the son of the sociologist Gerhard Lenski and the poet Jean Lenski. He is also the great-nephew of children's author Lois Lenski, the great-grandson of Lutheran commentator Richard C. H. Lenski, and the son-in-law of child development psychologist Alice Honig. He earned his AB from Oberlin College in 1976, and his PhD from the University of North Carolina in 1982.

== Scientific career ==
After completing his doctoral degree, Lenski did postdoctoral research in the laboratory of Bruce Levin at the University of Massachusetts, Amherst, where he began his work studying microbiology. In 1985, Lenski joined the faculty in the Department of Ecology and Evolutionary Biology at the University of California, Irvine, and he was promoted to associate professor there in 1988. In 1991, Lenski moved his lab to Michigan State University, joining the NSF Science and Technology Center for Microbial Ecology there. Lenski did sabbaticals at Oxford University, working with Robert May, and the University of Montpellier, hosted by Isabelle Olivieri.

== Research ==
=== E. coli experiment ===
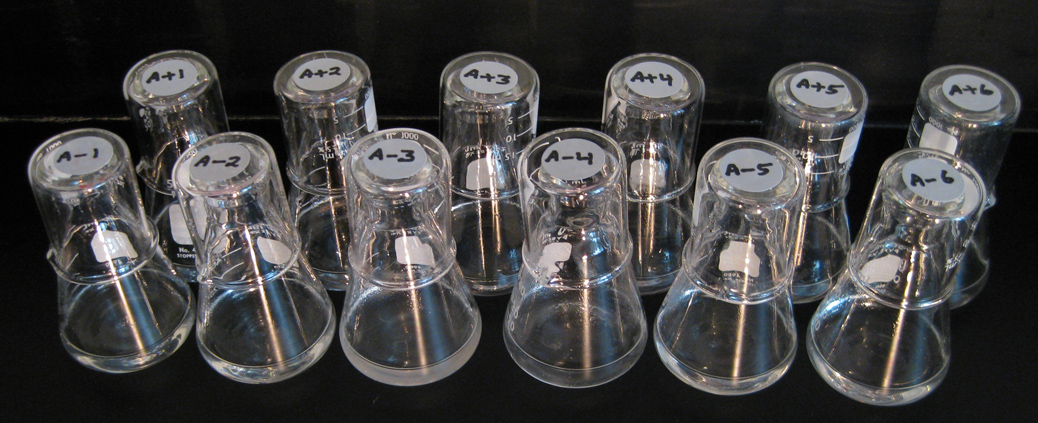
The 12 evolving E. coli populations on June 25, 2008

The E. coli long-term evolution experiment is an ongoing study in experimental evolution led by Richard Lenski that has been tracking genetic changes in 12 initially identical populations of asexual Escherichia coli bacteria since 24 February 1988. The populations reached the milestone of 75,000 generations in 2022.

Since the experiment's inception, Lenski and his colleagues have reported a wide array of genetic changes; some evolutionary adaptations have occurred in all 12 populations, while others have only appeared in one or a few populations. One particularly striking adaptation was the evolution of a strain of E. coli that was able to use citrate as a carbon source in an aerobic environment. A defining characteristic of E. coli is its inability to use citrate as an energy source under oxic conditions.

=== Avida simulation ===
Richard Lenski has collaborated with Charles Ofria, Chris Adami, and others on research using an artificial life computer program that allows detailed analyses on the evolution of complex systems. The system allows the user to set the rate of random mutations, while natural selection acts within a virtual world promotes those mutations that provide beneficial traits (and selects against deleterious mutations). The program was dubbed Avida and starts with an artificial petri dish where organisms reproduce and perform mathematical calculations to acquire rewards in the form of increased computer time for replication. The program randomly adds mutations to copies of the artificial organisms, which are then subject to natural selection. As the artificial life reproduces, different lines adapt and evolve depending on their environments. The program aims to parallel the evolution of biological life in a highly abstracted form and at a much faster speed.

== Media ==
In August 2013, having been inspired by a presentation by Titus Brown on the role of social media in science, Lenski began blogging at Telliamed Revisited and tweeting as @RELenski.

Lenski's research has received considerable attention, including lengthy discussion in Carl Zimmer's book on E. coli, Microcosm, and in Richard Dawkins' book on the evidence for evolution, The Greatest Show on Earth. Included in Dawkins' discussion was a description of the dialog Lenski had in 2008 with Andrew Schlafly, creator of Conservapedia, which Schlafly initiated as a reaction to reports of Lenski's description of the evolution of aerobic citrate usage in one of the long-term evolution experiment populations. These same findings were later cited by the creationist Ken Ham in a debate over evolution with Bill Nye. Lenski strongly criticized Ham's citation of his work and the conclusions Ham drew from it.

In 2021, Lenski was interviewed about the long-term evolution experiment by Derek Muller for a Veritasium video, which has been viewed over 6 million times.

== Honors ==
Lenski was awarded a Guggenheim Fellowship in 1991 and a MacArthur Fellowship in 1996, and in 2006 he was elected to the United States National Academy of Sciences.

Lenski is a fellow at the American Academy of Microbiology and the American Academy of Arts and Sciences, and he holds the title of the John A. Hannah Distinguished Professor of Microbial Ecology at Michigan State University. In 2012 he was an inaugural Fellow of the Ecological Society of America.

On February 17, 2010, he co-founded the NSF Science and Technology Center for the Study of Evolution in Action, known as the BEACON Center.

He was elected to the American Philosophical Society in 2018.

Lenski was the recipient of the 2021 Lifetime Achievement Award from the Society for the Study of Evolution.

== Selected works ==
- Lenski, R. E., and M. Travisano. 1994. Dynamics of adaptation and diversification: a 10,000-generation experiment with bacterial populations. Proceedings of the National Academy of Sciences, USA 91: 6808-6814.
- Lenski, R. E., and R. M. May. 1994. The evolution of virulence in parasites and pathogens: reconciliation between two competing hypotheses. Journal of Theoretical Biology 169: 253-265.
- Bohannan, B. J. M., and R. E. Lenski. 2000. Linking genetic change to community evolution: insights from studies of bacteria and bacteriophage. Ecology Letters 3: 362-377.
- Lenski, R. E., C. Ofria, R. T. Pennock, and C. Adami. 2003. The evolutionary origin of complex features. Nature 423: 139-144.
- Blount, Z. D., J. E. Barrick, C. J. Davidson, and R. E. Lenski. 2012. Genomic analysis of a key innovation in an experimental Escherichia coli population. Nature 489: 513-518.
- Wiser, M. J., N. Ribeck, and R. E. Lenski. 2013. Long-term dynamics of adaptation in asexual populations. Science 342: 1364-1367.
- Tenaillon, O., J. E. Barrick, N. Ribeck, D. E. Deatherage, J. L. Blanchard, A. Dasgupta, G. C. Wu, S. Wielgoss, S. Cruveiller, C. Médigue, D. Schneider, and R. E. Lenski. 2016. Tempo and mode of genome evolution in a 50,000-generation experiment. Nature 536: 165-170. [DOI: 10.1038/nature18959]
- Losos, J. B., and R. E. Lenski, eds. 2016. How Evolution Shapes Our Lives: Essays on Biology and Society. Princeton University Press, Princeton, NJ.
- Blount, Z. D., R. E. Lenski, and J. B. Losos. 2018. Contingency and determinism in evolution: replaying life's tape. Science 362: eaam5979. [DOI: 10.1126/science.aam5979]
