= Citrate synthase family =

Citrate_synt
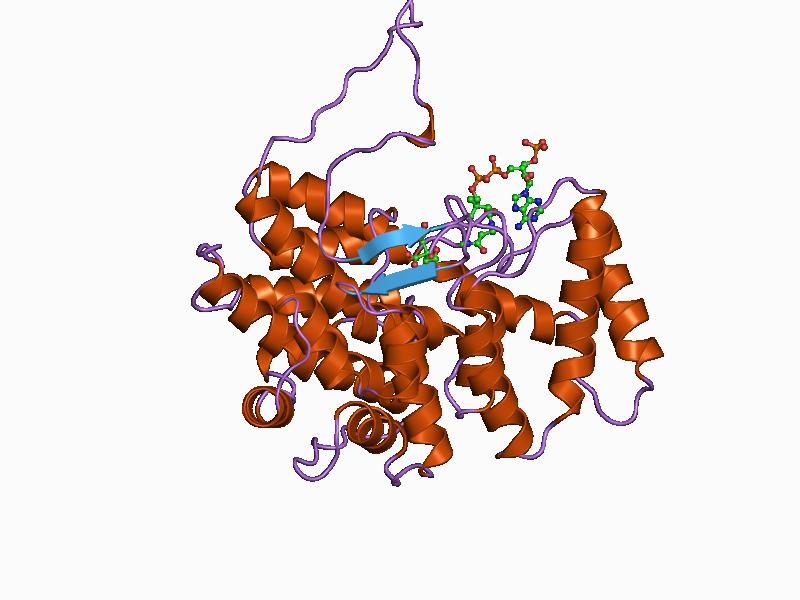
- cold-active citrate synthase

Identifiers
- Symbol: Citrate_synt
- Pfam: PF00285
- InterPro: IPR002020
- PROSITE: PDOC00422
- SCOP2: 1csc / SCOPe / SUPFAM
- CDD: cd06101
Available protein structures:
- PDB: IPR002020 PF00285 (ECOD; PDBsum)
- AlphaFold: IPR002020; PF00285

In molecular biology, the citrate synthase family of proteins includes the enzymes citrate synthase EC 2.3.3.1, and the related enzymes 2-methylcitrate synthase EC 2.3.3.5 and ATP citrate lyase EC 2.3.3.8.

Citrate synthase is a member of a small family of enzymes that can directly form a carbon-carbon bond without the presence of metal ion cofactors. It catalyses the first reaction in the Krebs' cycle, namely the conversion of oxaloacetate and acetyl-coenzyme A into citrate and coenzyme A. This reaction is important for energy generation and for carbon assimilation. The reaction proceeds via a non-covalently bound citryl-coenzyme A intermediate in a 2-step process (aldol-Claisen condensation followed by the hydrolysis of citryl-CoA).

Citrate synthase enzymes are found in two distinct structural types: type I enzymes (found in eukaryotes, Gram-positive bacteria and archaea) form homodimers and have shorter sequences than type II enzymes, which are found in Gram-negative bacteria and are hexameric in structure. In both types, the monomer is composed of two domains: a large alpha-helical domain consisting of two structural repeats, where the second repeat is interrupted by a small alpha-helical domain. The cleft between these domains forms the active site, where both citrate and acetyl-coenzyme A bind. The enzyme undergoes a conformational change upon binding of the oxaloacetate ligand, whereby the active site cleft closes over in order to form the acetyl-CoA binding site. The energy required for domain closure comes from the interaction of the enzyme with the substrate. Type II enzymes possess an extra N-terminal beta-sheet domain, and some type II enzymes are allosterically inhibited by NADH.

2-methylcitrate synthase catalyses the conversion of oxaloacetate and propanoyl-CoA into (2R,3S)-2-hydroxybutane-1,2,3-tricarboxylate and coenzyme A. This enzyme is induced during bacterial growth on propionate, while type II hexameric citrate synthase is constitutive.

ATP citrate lyase catalyses the Mg.ATP-dependent, CoA-dependent cleavage of citrate into oxaloacetate and acetyl-CoA, a key step in the reductive tricarboxylic acid pathway of CO_{2} assimilation used by a variety of autotrophic bacteria and archaea to fix carbon dioxide. ATP citrate lyase is composed of two distinct subunits. In eukaryotes, ATP citrate lyase is a homotetramer of a single large polypeptide, and is used to produce cytosolic acetyl-CoA from mitochondrial produced citrate.
