= Robert T. Pennock =

American philosopher

- Citizenship: American
- Known for: Witness at Kitzmiller v. Dover
- Awards: Outstanding Service Award (American Institute of Biological Sciences): Friend of Darwin Award (National Center for Science Education); Templeton Science & Religion Course Award and Templeton Prize for Exemplary Paper in Theology and the Natural Sciences (John Templeton Foundation); Election to the American Association for the Advancement of Science; Lifetime member of the National Research Council of the United States National Academy of Sciences
- Scientific career
- Fields: Philosophy of science, evolution, criticisms of creationism

Robert T. Pennock is an American philosopher working on the Avida digital organism project at Michigan State University where he has been full professor since 2000. Pennock was a witness in the Kitzmiller v. Dover Area School District trial, testifying on behalf of the plaintiffs, and described how intelligent design is an updated form of creationism and not science, pointing out that the arguments were essentially the same as traditional creationist arguments with adjustments to the message to eliminate explicit mention of God and the Bible as well as adopting a postmodern deconstructionist language. Pennock also laid out the philosophical history of methodological and philosophical naturalism as they underpin to science, and explained that if intelligent design were truly embraced it would return Western civilization to a pre-Enlightenment state.

== Education and career ==
Pennock received his Ph.D. in the history and philosophy of science from the University of Pittsburgh, where he graduated summa cum laude. In 1997, he co-directed a National Science Foundation Chautauqua Workshop on the "Ethical Implications of the Human Genome Project." Pennock has served as president of the University of Texas at Austin Chapter of Sigma Xi and is a member of the American Philosophical Association, the National Center for Science Education and the American Association for the Advancement of Science.

=== Writing and speaking ===
He has written and edited books and articles critical of intelligent design, using the term methodological naturalism to emphasise that the scientific method inherently explains observable events in nature only by natural causes, without assuming the existence or non-existence of the supernatural, and is not based on "dogmatic" metaphysical naturalism as claimed by creationists. He has also been a featured speaker at religious, freethinking, and atheist gatherings.

=== Kitzmiller v. Dover Area School District ===
Pennock's testimony as an expert witness in Kitzmiller v. Dover Area School District (2005) was cited in the concluding memorandum by Judge John E. Jones III as evidence that "Methodological naturalism is a “ground rule” of science today which requires scientists to seek explanations in the world around us based upon what we can observe, test, replicate, and verify" contributing to the conclusion "that [intelligent design] is an interesting theological argument, but that it is not science".

== Awards ==
In 2009 Pennock received the American Institute of Biological Sciences's Outstanding Service Award, given "in recognition of an individual's (or organization's) noteworthy service to the biological sciences". Pennock has also received the "Friend of Darwin Award" from the National Center for Science Education. His book on creationism, Tower of Babel, was nominated for a National Book Award and PEN Award, and was a finalist for the ForeWord Book-of-the-Year. Pennock has also won several awards for his essays and teaching, including the Michael R. Bennett Prize, the Templeton Prize for Exemplary Paper in Theology and the Natural Sciences, Apple for the Teacher Award, and a Templeton Science & Religion Course Award. In 2006 Pennock was elected to the American Association for the Advancement of Science for "voicing the philosophical deficits in the pro-intelligent design argument and defending against its inclusion in science teaching" and in 2008 was designated a lifetime member of the National Research Council of the United States National Academy of Sciences.

== Books ==
- Tower of Babel: The Evidence Against the New Creationism ISBN 0-262-16180-X, ISBN 0-262-66165-9
- Intelligent Design Creationism and Its Critics: Philosophical, Theological, and Scientific Perspectives (editor) ISBN 0-262-16204-0, ISBN 0-262-66124-1
- An Instinct for Truth: Curiosity and the Moral Character of Science ISBN 978-0262042581
