= Thomas S. Ray =

American zoologist (born 1954)

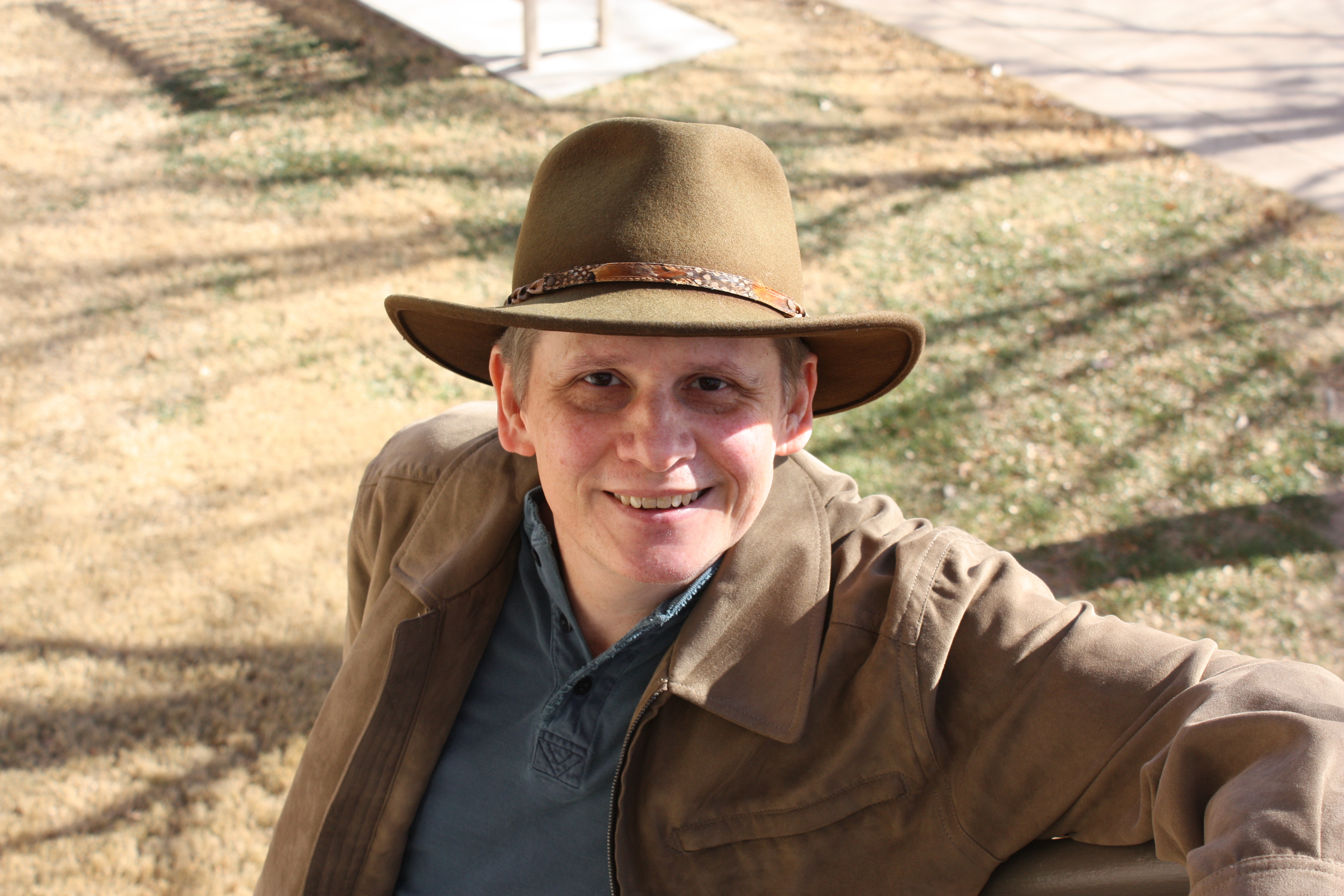
- Ray in 2011
- Born: September 21, 1954 (age 71); Norman, Oklahoma, United States
- Education: Florida State University; Harvard University
- Occupations: Ecologist, zoologist
- Known for: Tierra, skototropism

Thomas S. Ray (born September 21, 1954) is an ecologist who created and developed the Tierra project, a computer simulation of artificial life.

== Career ==
In 1975, he and Donald R. Strong were the first to propose the theory of skototropism in an article in the journal Science (190: 804-806), which he later worked into his senior thesis at Florida State University (FSU), after conducting additional experiments. The thesis was expanded into his Ph.D. thesis at Harvard University. While at FSU, he earned undergraduate degrees in biology and chemistry.

From 1998 to 2021 he was Professor of Biology and Adjunct Professor of Computer Science at the University of Oklahoma in Norman. Previously, he was assistant professor and associate professor in the School of Life and Health Sciences at the University of Delaware from 1981 to 1998. Ray is also a former member of the International Core War Society.

== Cultural references ==
In The Rise of Endymion, Dan Simmons's conclusion to his famous Hyperion Cantos sci-fi series, it is revealed by the character of Aenea that the TechnoCore originated from a human experiment in which computer programs were allowed to compete for resources (e.g. memory) and evolve accordingly. It is specified that the one responsible for it was Ray, which possibly refers to the biologist's Tierra project.

== Selected publications ==
- Strong, Donald R.; Ray, Thomas S. (1 January 1975). "Host Tree Location Behavior of a Tropical Vine (Monstera gigantea) by Skototropism". Science. 190 (4216): 804–806. Bibcode:1975Sci...190..804S. doi:10.1126/science.190.4216.804. JSTOR 1741614. S2CID 84386403.
