= Chris Adami =

German-American academic

Christoph Adami
- Born: August 30, 1962 (age 63); Brussels, Belgium
- Education: University of Bonn; Stony Brook University
- Known for: Negative quantum entropy Digital evolution Avida
- Awards: Fairchild Prize Fellowship (1992); Caltech President's Fund Award (1996); NASA Exceptional Achievement Medal (2002); Fellow of the AAAS (2012) Fellow of the American Physical Society (2017)
- Scientific career
- Fields: Evolutionary Biology and Physics
- Institutions: Stony Brook University California Institute of Technology; Jet Propulsion Laboratory Keck Graduate Institute; Michigan State University
- Academic advisors: Gerald E. Brown
- Doctoral students: Charles Ofria

Christoph Carl Herbert "Chris" Adami (born August 30, 1962) is a German-American professor of microbiology and molecular genetics, as well as professor of physics and astronomy, at Michigan State University. He is a core faculty member of the Ecology, Evolution, and Behavior (EEB) Program there.

== Education ==
Adami was born in Brussels, Belgium, and graduated from the European School of Brussels I. He obtained a Diplom in physics from the University of Bonn and an MA and a Ph.D. in theoretical nuclear physics from Stony Brook University in 1991. Adami was a Division Prize Fellow in the lab of Steven E. Koonin at the California Institute of Technology from 1992-1995, and was subsequently on the Caltech faculty as a senior research associate.

== Career ==
Before joining Michigan State University, he was a professor of Applied Life Sciences at the Keck Graduate Institute in Claremont, California. Adami is best known for his work on Avida, an artificial life simulator used to study evolutionary biology, and for applying the theory of information to physical and biological systems. Together with Nicolas J. Cerf, Adami made significant advances in the quantum theory of information in the late 1990s.

== Honors ==
He received the NASA Exceptional Achievement Medal while serving at JPL, and was elected a Fellow of the AAAS in 2012. He was also elected a Fellow of the American Physical Society in 2017. On July 31, 2019, he was awarded the Lifetime Achievement Award by the International Society for Artificial Life., and the Beal Outstanding Faculty Award by Michigan State University in 2025.

== Works ==
- Adami, C.; Belew, R.; Kitano, H.; Taylor, C. (1998). Proceedings of the 6th International Conference on Artificial Life. MIT Press. ASIN 0262510995.
- Adami, C. (1998). Introduction to Artificial Life. Springer Verlag. ISBN 0387946462.
- Lenski, R. E.; Ofria, C.; Pennock, R. T.; Adami, C. (2003). "The evolutionary origin of complex features" (PDF). Nature. 423 (6936): 139–144. Bibcode:2003Natur.423..139L. doi:10.1038/nature01568. PMID 12736677. S2CID 4401833. Archived from the original (PDF) on 2021-01-21.
- Adami, Christoph (2024-01-16). The Evolution of Biological Information: How Evolution Creates Complexity, from Viruses to Brains (1st ed.). Princeton, NJ: Princeton University Press. ISBN 978-0-691-24116-6.
