= Michael Egnor =

American neurosurgeon

- Education: Columbia University (MD)
- Occupation: Neurosurgeon

Michael Egnor is an American pediatric neurosurgeon and professor of neurological surgery at Stony Brook University. He is an advocate of intelligent design, a pseudoscientific argument for the existence of God, and a blogger at the Discovery Institute.

== Career ==
Egnor earned his Doctor of Medicine (M.D.) from the Columbia University College of Physicians and Surgeons. He completed his residency at Jackson Memorial Hospital. He is Professor of Neurosurgery and Pediatrics at State University of New York at Stony Brook.

In 2005 Egnor operated on a young boy whose head was crushed by his father's SUV. The case was reported in Newsday, Good Morning America and New York magazine. His research on hydrocephalus has been published in the Journal of Neurosurgery and the Pediatrics journal.

== Intelligent design ==
Egnor rejected evolutionary theory after reading Michael Denton's book Evolution: A Theory in Crisis and said "claims of evolutionary biologists go wildly beyond the evidence." In 2007 he joined the Discovery Institute's Evolution News & Views blog.

Biologist Jerry Coyne responded to Egnor's article by saying that Egnor accepted widely discredited claims (claims recanted by Denton himself in a later book) and "Egnor is decades out of date and shows no sign of knowing anything at all about evolutionary biology in the 21st century." Egnor later published a series of comprehensive articles on Discovery Institute responding to Coyne's remarks. Egnor is a signatory to the Discovery Institute intelligent design campaign A Scientific Dissent From Darwinism and Physicians and Surgeons who Dissent from Darwinism.

In March 2007, when the Alliance for Science sponsored an essay contest for high school students on the topic "Why I would want my doctor to have studied evolution," Egnor responded by posting an essay on the Discovery Institute's intelligent design blog claiming that evolution was irrelevant to medicine. Burt Humburg criticized him on the blog Panda's Thumb citing the benefits of evolution to medicine and, contrary to Egnor's claim, that physicians do study evolution.

Egnor appeared in Expelled: No Intelligence Allowed. In the film, Ben Stein describes this as "Darwinists were quick to try and exterminate this new threat," and Egnor says he was shocked by the "viciousness" and "baseness" of the response. The website Expelled Exposed, created by the National Center for Science Education (NCSE), responded by saying that Egnor must never have been on the Internet before.

In September 2021 Egnor debated Matt Dillahunty.

== Aristotelian dualism ==
Egnor has defended Aristotelian dualism. He rejects both Cartesian dualism and materialism. He argues that observations during brain surgery, studies of brain seizures, split-brain surgery patients and accounts of near-death experiences support the dualism of Aristotle and Thomas Aquinas, a type of dualism that is distinct from that of René Descartes. Clinical neurologist Steven Novella who has debated Egnor has criticized his arguments for dualism as a God of the gaps fallacy and has suggested that Egnor "uses his writings to confuse and misdirect, and to undermine the public understanding of science".

In 2025, Egnor authored The Immortal Mind: A Neurosurgeon’s Case for the Existence of the Soul with Denyse O'Leary.

He has defended mind-body dualism.

== Personal life ==
Egnor is a Catholic. He and his wife and their four children live in Stony Brook, New York.
