= Strengths and weaknesses of evolution =

Scientists are always probing the strengths and weakness of their hypotheses. That is the very nature of the enterprise. But evolution is no longer a hypothesis. It is a theory rigorously supported by abundant evidence. The weaknesses that creationists hope to teach as a way of refuting evolution are themselves antiquated, long since filed away as solved. The religious faith underlying creationism has a place, in church and social studies courses. Science belongs in science classrooms.

— The Cons of Creationism, editorial from The New York Times

"Strengths and weaknesses of evolution" is a controversial phrase that has been proposed for (and in Texas introduced into) public school science curricula. Those proposing the phrase, such as the chairman of the Texas State Board of Education (SBOE), Don McLeroy, purport that there are weaknesses in the theory of evolution and in the evidence that life has evolved that should be taught for a balanced treatment of the subject of evolution. The scientific community rejects that any substantive weaknesses exist in the scientific theory, or in the data that it explains, and views the examples that have been given in support of the phrasing as being without merit and long refuted.

This has led scientists and journalists to conclude that the phrase is a creationist tactic to introduce religion into science courses. The phrase was introduced by the SBOE in the late 1980s. Since then it has been promoted in California and Missouri. In late 2008, it became a highly publicized issue as the Texas SBOE held public hearings on whether this language should be removed from the curriculum. According to the National Center for Science Education, the phrase, like 'Teach the controversy' and 'Critical Analysis of Evolution', is an attempt in a series of legal and political tactics adopted by intelligent design advocates to encourage educators to teach fallacious information — that a controversy exists among scientists over whether evolution has occurred.

== History ==
=== Texas SBOE ===
The "strengths and weaknesses" language was included in the curriculum standards in Texas to appease creationists when the SBOE first mandated the teaching of evolution in the late 1980s.

In 2003, the "strengths and weaknesses" language in the standards was employed by members of the board in an unsuccessful attempt to dilute the treatment of evolution in the biology textbooks they were considering.

In September 2008 the 21st Century Science Coalition released a petition to remove the phrase "strengths and weaknesses" from the public school guidelines for science classrooms in Texas. As of November 2008, 588 scientists at Texas universities and 777 other scientists across the state have signed the petition.

In the summer of 2008/2009 the Texas SBOE is determining the curriculum for the next decade, including deciding whether the "strengths and weaknesses" of evolution should be taught. While this language was described by The New York Times as a "benign-sounding phrase", they mention that critics state that it is a new strategy to undermine the teaching of evolution, and for students to hear religious objections under the heading of scientific discourse. The then SBOE Chairman, Don McLeroy, a Young Earth creationist dentist from Central Texas, denied that the language "is subterfuge for bringing in creationism." McLeroy views the debate as being between "two systems of science" — "a creationist system and a naturalist system". These views have alarmed Texas educators, including former chairman of the department of medicine at the University of Texas Southwestern Medical Center at Dallas Dan Foster, who stated that "[s]erious students will not come to study in our universities if Texas is labeled scientifically backward".

In December 2008, the San Antonio Express-News stated in an editorial that the Texas SBOE has a "long history of trying to water down the science curriculum with criticisms of evolution that lack scientific credibility."

The lesson we draw from these shenanigans is that scientifically illiterate boards of education should leave the curriculum to educators and scientists who know what constitutes a sound education.

— Texas Two-Step, editorial from The New York Times condemning the amendments

In January 2009, the Texas SBOE voted to remove the 'Strengths and Weaknesses" language, but its conservative faction, led by Don McLeroy, managed to pass several amendments to the science curriculum that opponents describe as opening the door to teaching objections to evolution that might lead students to reject it. These included one amendment that compels science teachers to teach about aspects of the fossil record that do not neatly fit with gradualism, but rather show the relatively sudden appearance of some species while others seem to remain unchanged for millions of years. Prominent University of Texas biology professor David Hillis described the amendments as "mak[ing] no sense to me ... It's a clear indication that the chairman of the state school board doesn’t understand the science." Board member Ken Mercer of San Antonio, who voted to keep "strengths and weaknesses" described his support for the language in explicitly religious terms: "It's an issue of freedom of religion." This view was contradicted by fellow social conservative board member Barbara Cargill, who stated "[t]his isn’t about religion."

On March 13, 2009 a bill (HB 4224) was introduced in the Texas House of Representatives that would require the Texas SBOE to restore the "strengths and weaknesses" language in the state science standards.

=== California ===
In 2003 and 2004, creationist lawyer Larry Caldwell sought to persuade the Roseville Joint Union High School District board of trustees to adopt a policy which included teaching "the scientific strengths and weaknesses" of evolution. When this was rejected, he filed a complaint in federal court against the district, alleging that his civil rights were violated during the controversy, resulting in a summary judgment against him in September 2007.

=== Discovery Institute ===
In February 2008 the Discovery Institute created an Academic Freedom petition that stated "Teachers should be protected from being fired, harassed, intimidated, or discriminated against for objectively presenting the scientific strengths and weaknesses of Darwinian theory."

=== Missouri ===
In February 2009, House Bill 656, introduced in the Missouri House of Representatives, proposed that "teachers shall be permitted to help students understand, analyze, critique, and review in an objective manner the scientific strengths and scientific weaknesses of theories of biological and chemical evolution." This bill died when the Missouri legislative session ended on May 15, 2009.

=== Tennessee ===
On February 9, 2011, Tennessee House of Representatives member Bill Dunn introduced House Bill 368, which states that "teachers shall be permitted to help students understand, analyze, critique, and review in an objective manner the scientific strengths and scientific weaknesses of existing scientific theories covered in the course being taught." On February 16, 2011, Tennessee State Senator Bo Watson introduced an identical bill, Senate Bill 893. The House Bill was passed by the House Education Committee on March 29, 2011, and referred to the House Calendar and Rules Committee. Alan I. Leshner, the chief executive officer of the American Association for the Advancement of Science and Executive Publisher of the journal Science, wrote to the House of Representatives opposing the Bill, stating "There is virtually no scientific controversy among the overwhelming majority of researchers on the core facts of global warming and evolution. Asserting that there are significant scientific controversies about the overall nature of these concepts when there are none will only confuse students, not enlighten them."

== Educational and scientific value ==
While anti-evolution members of the Texas SBOE have claimed their "weaknesses" campaign has nothing to do with faith, that "We're not putting religion in books", scientists have rebutted that these weaknesses are simply falsehoods. Scientists testified at the state board hearing in November 2008 that evolution is a scientific theory, not a hypothesis and thus does not have weaknesses.

Some scientists, including Andrew Ellington, professor of biochemistry at the University of Texas, and Robert Dennison, Houston Independent School District's AP science lead teacher, are concerned that the mention of "weaknesses" in the curriculum standards has had a chilling effect on science teachers.

In a survey commissioned by the Texas Freedom Network, "94% of Texas scientists indicated that claimed "weaknesses" are not valid scientific objections to evolution (with 87% saying that they “strongly disagree” that such weaknesses should be considered valid)."

== Specific weaknesses and their scientific rebuttals ==
Supporters of the 'strengths and weaknesses of evolution' language have proposed the following as weaknesses of evolution, and the scientific community has responded with the following rebuttals:

Argument	Scientific rebuttal
Evolution violates the first law of thermodynamics	Sunlight is the ultimate source of energy for life on Earth and provides the energy needed for organisms to live and reproduce. As the existence and evolution of life neither creates nor destroys this energy, it does not violate the first law of thermodynamics.
Evolution violates the second law of thermodynamics	The second law only applies to closed systems that do not exchange matter or energy with their surroundings. Both the Earth and all living organisms are open systems. For further details see Evolution and the second law of thermodynamics and Entropy and life.
Evolution violates the Law of Biogenesis	Pasteur's law only disproved the (then current) idea that life forms such as mice, maggots, and bacteria can appear fully formed. It does not say that very primitive life cannot form from increasingly complex molecules.
Evolution is unable to explain the Cambrian Explosion	How real was the explosion?; Possible causes of the “explosion”
Alleged frauds and forgeries such as Piltdown Man and Haeckel's embryo drawings	Rebuttal of allegations that past evidence for evolution has been overturned Further information: Icons of Evolution
Evolution is not observable	Observability of evolution
Evolution is only a theory and not a fact	Evolution is both a theory and a fact.

== See also ==
- Academic Freedom bills
- Christine Comer
- Creation–evolution controversy
- Critical Analysis of Evolution
- Free Speech on Evolution
- Intelligent design in politics
- Neo-creationism
- Stand up for science
- Teach the controversy
