= Denyse O'Leary =

Canadian author

- Born: March 31, 1950 (age 76); Saskatchewan
- Occupation: Author

Denyse O'Leary (born March 31, 1950) is a Canadian author, blogger and freelance journalist. She is an advocate of mind-body dualism and the pseudoscientific concept of intelligent design.

== Biography ==
O'Leary was born in Saskatchewan to John Patrick and Blanche Aurore. She obtained a B.A. in English language and literature from Wilfrid Laurier University in 1971.

O'Leary has written for the Catholic Education Resource Center, Salvo, The Globe and Mail and The Toronto Star.

In 2008, she co-authored with Mario Beauregard The Spiritual Brain: A Neuroscientist's Case for the Existence of the Soul, which criticizes reductive materialism and proposed the existence of a non-material self, or soul. The book argues that religious and spiritual experiences cannot be reduced wholly to neurological functioning. Beauregard and O’Leary argue that the brain "is not the mind; it is an organ suitable for connecting a mind to the rest of the universe".

== Intelligent design ==
O'Leary is an advocate of the pseudoscientific concept of intelligent design. She is a blogger at the Discovery Institute websites Evolution News, Mind Matters and Uncommon Descent.

O'Leary has been criticized for quoting out of context. PZ Myers has described O'Leary as the "biggest, most ignorant idiot at the Discovery Institute".

== Personal life ==
She married Joseph Alexander Handler in 1970; they divorced in 1987. She is a former evangelical Anglican who converted to Catholicism. She is a member of the Ordinariate of the Chair of St. Peter.

== Selected publications ==
- Faith@Science: Why Science Needs Faith in the Twenty-First Century (2001)
- Intelligent Design: Beyond Creation vs. Evolution (2002)
- By Design or By Chance? The Growing Controversy on the Origins of Life in the Universe (2004)
- The Spiritual Brain: A Neuroscientist's Case for the Existence of the Soul (with Mario Beauregard, 2008)
