= Intelligent design in politics =

Aspect of creationism

The intelligent design movement has conducted an organized campaign largely in the United States that promotes a pseudoscientific, neo-creationist religious agenda calling for broad social, academic and political changes centering on intelligent design.

== International context ==
Though creationism and intelligent design are not supported by many mainstream scientists, there are significant minorities in the general public in most developed countries that say they doubt or reject the theory of evolution, likely because of their religious beliefs. In underdeveloped countries where rates of religious belief are much higher, support of evolution is consequently lower.

== Europe ==
In Europe, religion generally has much less influence on politics than in the United States or the developing world. Despite this, there are pockets of creationist and intelligent design activity.

=== Council of Europe ===
The Council of Europe's Committee on Culture, Science and Education released a report in June 2007 entitled "The Dangers of Creationism in Education". One of the council members, Anne Brasseur said that the aim of the report was to anchor evolution in school curricula, and warned that there was still resistance in many European countries. She provided the following examples in an interview with German newspaper Der Spiegel:

- A former deputy education minister of Poland called the theory of evolution a lie.
- Activism against teaching evolution in grade school by some Russian parents
- A 2004 proposed decree against evolution
- A proposed "Genesis-Land" theme park in Switzerland based on the Creation Museum in Kentucky.
- Creationist lectures and symposia in the United Kingdom
- The publication and free distribution of the "Atlas of Creation" by Harun Yahya in Turkey
- The Ministry of Education for the German state of Hesse allowing the teaching of theory of creation in biology class
- The publishing house "Studiengemeinschaft Wort und Wissen" is now publishing the sixth edition of a grade school textbook that includes the theory of intelligent design.

== North America ==
=== Canada ===
Unlike in the United States the issue has never been the subject of a major Supreme Court case, nor does it figure prominently in the national media.

In Canada, education is the constitutional responsibility of the provinces. No province has taught creationism in its official public school curriculum in modern times, however, there are various different approaches to the teaching of evolution and religion across the country, as well as various exceptions for separate schools (publicly funded religious school, primarily Catholic), private schools, alternative schools, Reserve schools, charter schools, and so on. In most provincial curricula (excluding Quebec, where it has been mandatory in elementary schools since 2004) evolutionary theory is only required in Grade 11 or 12; however, it can be taught earlier at the discretion of local school boards and teachers.

Around 63,000 Canadian children attend "Christian" (primarily evangelical) schools outside of the provincial systems (which include both the public [secular] and Catholic schools), where they are generally taught creationism rather than evolution.

In 2006, the ministry of education in Quebec ordered unlicensed private evangelical Christian schools to start teaching evolution and sexual education, otherwise the schools would be closed. In Ontario, private schools are not required to teach either evolution or sex education.

In 2009, the government under the Progressive Conservative Association of Alberta introduced Bill 44 which allows parents to pull their children out of public school classrooms if they disagree with the controversial subject matter being discussed (such as evolution or homosexuality). Later amendments to the bill clarified that parents could choose to pull their children from religion classes, but not from science classes.

=== United States ===
A number of specific political strategies and tactics have been employed by intelligent design proponents. These range from attempts at the state level to undermine or remove altogether the presence of evolutionary theory from the public school classroom, to having the federal government mandate the teaching of intelligent design, to 'stacking' municipal, county and state school boards with intelligent design proponents. The Discovery Institute has been driving force in most cases, providing a range of support from material assistance to federal, state and regional elected representatives in the drafting of bills to supporting and advising individual parents confronting their school boards.

A feature of the Discovery Institute intelligent design campaigns has been extensive lobbying and public relations campaigns conducted on behalf of intelligent design proponents in order to overcome professional setbacks such as that of Guillermo Gonzalez, Richard Sternberg and Francis Beckwith. These efforts are focused on two efforts: the Teach the Controversy and Critical Analysis of Evolution campaigns. These campaigns gained prominence after the Kitzmiller v. Dover Area School District trial where Judge John E. Jones III ruled that teaching intelligent design or presenting it as an alternative to evolution was a violation of the Establishment Clause of the First Amendment to the U.S. Constitution because intelligent design is not legitimate science but essentially religious in nature.

Both the Teach the Controversy and Critical Analysis of Evolution strategies and resources for them come from the Discovery Institute and its Center for Science and Culture, the hub of the intelligent design movement. These strategies are seen as another iteration of the Discovery Institute's campaign to "defeat [the] materialist world view" represented by the theory of evolution in favor of "a science consonant with Christian and theistic convictions". According to the Center for Science and Culture's weblog, at least 10 state legislatures are now considering legislation reconsidering how evolution is taught. Many of these initiatives benefit from significant legal assistance from a number of conservative legal foundations including the Thomas More Law Center, the Alliance Defense Fund, and Quality Science Education for All (QSEA). All have litigated extensively on behalf of the movement.

==== Specific cases ====
===== 1999 & 2005 creationist Kansas Boards of Education =====
In 1999 the Kansas Board of Education voted to delete references to evolution from Kansas science standards. This had the net effect of removing the teaching of evolution from the state's science curriculum. The move angered the mainstream science community which predicted a resulting loss of rigor and quality in science education. The Board's decision was in part influenced by the presence of recently elected conservative Christians to the board and heavy lobbying by the Discovery Institute's Center for Science and Culture, then known as the "Center for the Renewal of Science and Culture" (CRSC). Subsequent elections altered the membership of the school board and led to renewed backing for evolution instruction in 2001.

Elections in 2004 gave religious conservatives a contentious 6-4 majority. The board in 2005 was finalizing new science standards which would have guided teachers about how and what to teach students. A proposal advanced by conservatives and intelligent design proponents, with support from the Center for Science and Culture, was similar to the Critical Analysis of Evolution plan for which the Center lobbied the Ohio Board of Education in 2002. It would not have eliminated evolution entirely from instruction, nor would it require intelligent design to be presented as an alternative to evolution, but the Critical Analysis of Evolution plan treated evolution as a flawed theory, a position that defied mainstream scientific views.

On 8 November 2005, the Kansas Board of Education, chaired by veterinarian Steve Abrams, approved new science teaching standards that included the Critical Analysis of Evolution. The Discovery Institute was key in the drafting and adoption of the new standards which were approved by 6 to 4, reflecting the makeup of religious conservatives on the board.

Critics of the new Kansas standards noted that they promoted the teaching of intelligent design. Kansas standards previously supported evolutionary theory, which held that all life had a common origin. Creationists claimed that theory had been challenged by their interpretation of fossils and molecular biology. They had also echoed the standard intelligent design argument that there is a controversy as to whether changes over time in one species can lead to a new species.

After the board of education decided to include more criticism of evolution in its school science standards, a University of Kansas professor, Paul Mirecki, proposed to teach a class called "Special Topics in Religion: intelligent design, Creationism and other Religious Mythologies." The class was cancelled and the professor was forced to resign as chairman of the university's religious studies department. Mirecki had alleged that he was also assaulted and beaten by creationists who opposed his teaching of the class

In primary election held on August 1, 2006, pro-creationist conservative Republicans lost their 6-4 board majority when incumbent Connie Morris from Cheyenne County, Kansas, was defeated by moderate Republican Sally Cauble, of Liberal, Kansas. Another slot which until then was held by a retiring conservative whose son-in-law from Idaho, Brad Patzer, ran for her office, was won by Jana Shaver, a pro-evolution Republican from Independence, Kansas.

Morris had described evolution in a taxpayer-funded constituent newsletter as "an age-old fairy tale" and "a nice bedtime story" unsupported by science.

The fate of Education Commissioner and former Koch brothers Kansas Policy Institute director, Bob Corkins, was sealed by the ouster of the anti-evolutionists in 2006. He was an appointee of the board's creationists and endured strong criticism for his lack of previous educational leadership experience. Republican state Sen. John Vratil, characterized Corkins' hiring as education commissioner as "sort of like making Saddam Hussein president of the United States." The executive director of the American Association of School Administrators, Paul Houston, had written a letter referring to Corkins as an "amateur."

===== 2000 Congressional briefing =====
In 2000, the leading intelligent design proponents operating through the Discovery Institute held a congressional briefing in Washington, D.C., to promote intelligent design to lawmakers. Sen. Rick Santorum was (and continues to be) one of intelligent design's most vocal supporters. One result of this briefing was that Sen. Santorum inserted pro-intelligent design language into the No Child Left Behind bill calling for students to be taught why evolution "generates so much continuing controversy," an assertion heavily promoted by the Discovery Institute.

===== 2001 Santorum Amendment =====
The Santorum Amendment was a failed proposed amendment to the 2001 education act No Child Left Behind of 2001. The inclusion of the amendment in the Act was heavily lobbied for by the Discovery Institute, which also participated in the drafting of the original language of the amendment. Although only a modified form of the amendment appeared in the conference report, the amendment itself was not included in the legislation that President George W. Bush signed.

It was not the victory intelligent design proponents had hoped for. Conference reports do not carry the weight of law and are merely explanatory in nature, and, in any case, the amendment failed. Nonetheless, an email newsletter by the Discovery Institute contained the sentence "Undoubtedly this will change the face of the debate over the theories of evolution and intelligent design in America. ... It also seems that the Darwinian monopoly on public science education, and perhaps the biological sciences in general, is ending" and Senator Sam Brownback of Kansas cited the amendment as vindicating the 1999 Kansas school board decision (since overturned) to eliminate evolution questions from State tests. Consistent with the Wedge strategy its inclusion in the conference report on the failed amendment continues to be incorrectly cited by the Discovery Institute and other intelligent design supporters as providing federal sanction for intelligent design. Reps. John Boehner and Steve Chabot of Ohio and Sen. Judd Gregg of New Hampshire, along with Santorum, have signed letters supporting the Discovery Institute's interpretation of the Santorum amendment. One of those letters was sent to the president and vice-president of the Ohio Board of Education in 2002; the other was sent to the Texas Board of Education in 2003, see below.

===== 2001 Louisiana, House Bill 1286 =====
This bill directs that the state shall not print or distribute any material containing claims known to be false or fraudulent. It also specifically provides for any citizen to be able to sue the state using the provisions of this bill.

===== 2001 Michigan, House Bill 4382 =====
A bill proposed by Rep. Gosselin (House Bill 4382) which sought to amend 1976 PA 451, "The revised school code". The bill directed that In the science standards, all references to "evolution" and "how species change through time" would be modified to indicate that this is an unproven theory, by adding the phrase "all students will explain the competing theories of evolution and natural selection based on random mutation and the theory that life is the result of the purposeful, intelligent design of a creator." The bill also directed that in the science standards for middle and high school, all references to "evolution" and "natural selection" would be modified to indicate that these are unproven theories, by adding the phrase "describe how life may be the result of the purposeful, intelligent design of a creator." And in the science standards for middle and high school, the bill directed all references to "evolution" and "natural selection" would be modified to indicate that these are unproven theories, by adding the phrase "explain the competing theories of evolution and natural selection based on random mutation and the theory that life is the result of the purposeful, intelligent design of a creator." The bill also would have required that the recommended model core academic curriculum content standards that are developed and periodically updated by the state board comply with these provisions. Also under the bill the State Board would have been required to make these revisions as soon as practicable after the effective date of the bill, if it had been enacted. Text of HB4382 (PDF)

===== 2001 Georgia, House Bill 391 =====
This bill directed teachers to distinguish between "philosophical materialism" and "authentic science", and extended to teachers the "right" to present and critique any scientific theory of the origins or life or species. Failed in committee.

===== 2001 West Virginia, House Bill 2554 =====
An "equal-time" bill, described in its title as "Providing for the teaching of creation science and evolution science on an equal basis in the public schools." HB2554 was introduced in the state legislature in February 2001, and died in committee.

===== 2001 Kanawha County, West Virginia =====
In February 2001 a parent filed a complaint with the Kanawha County Board of Education claiming that science textbooks used there contain "false and fraudulent" information about evolution. The parent and 30 cosigners opposed to evolution asserted that the textbooks are in violation of state law because they are outdated or inaccurate. As evidence that textbooks which include evolution are flawed, they cited Jonathan Well's of the Discovery Institute book Icons of Evolution. The board rejected the claim.

===== 2001 Arkansas, House Bill 2548 =====
In 2001 Representative Jim Holt proposed a bill in the Arkansas legislature that would make it illegal for the state or any of its agencies to use state funds to purchase materials that contained false or fraudulent claims. A list of such claims was provided in the text of House Bill 2548 (HB2548). Much of the text of the examples given was either quoted verbatim from anti-evolutionary sources or was a close paraphrase of such materials. The sources cited in the bill included the cartoon tract, "Big Daddy?" published by Jack Chick. Critics of the bill alleged that many of the "examples" selected were themselves either false or misleading. March 21, 2001, Representative Holt invited his friend and controversial anti-evolutionist Kent Hovind to testify before a committee of the Arkansas Legislature in support of the bill. In April 2001 a motion was passed to postpone HB 2548 indefinitely for study during the interim by the Joint Interim Committee on Education.

===== 2001 Montana, House Bill 588 =====
House Bill 588 by Rep. Joe Balyeat, R-Bozeman, was presented as an "objectivity in science education" measure, and would have directed the approval of evolution and creationism materials by an appointed six-member committee. The bill failed in committee.

===== 2001 Pennsylvania Board of Education =====
In July 2001 the Pennsylvania Board of Education gave final approval to revised science standards. Language in early versions of the standards sought to raise questions about the status of evolution as science and a theory. Science educators and other Pennsylvania citizens expressed concern that the proposed standards might open the way to teaching creationism in science classes because of ambiguous or unclear wording. However, the final standards do not contain the contested language and the standards were approved by the legislature.

===== 2002 Ohio Board of Education =====
In March 2002 Ohio held hearings on revising the state science standards. The Discovery Institute's Stephen C. Meyer proposed to the Ohio Board of Education the Institute's Critical Analysis of Evolution that featured intelligent design prominently in its curricula. Concurrently, a factitious redefinition of science to include God was proposed to the Ohio legislature, so that the legislature would then be able to get behind the set of standards that included intelligent design. The Discovery Institute's model lesson plan was adopted in part by the state for Ohio science teachers in October 2002, though the Board advised that the science standards do "not mandate the teaching or testing of intelligent design". This was touted as a significant victory by the Discovery Institute.

In February 2006, the Ohio Board of Education voted 11-4 to delete the science standard and correlating lesson plan adopted in 2002. The board also rejected a competing plan from intelligent design proponents to request a legal opinion from the state attorney general on the constitutionality of the science standards. Intelligent design proponents pledged to force another vote on the issue.

===== 2002 Cobb County, Georgia =====
In 2002 the Cobb County school board required stickers placed in a science textbook. Stating that evolution was "a theory, not a fact," the sticker was placed in the ninth-grade biology text after parents complained to the Cobb County school board that alternative ideas about the origin of life were not presented. A group of parents represented by the American Civil Liberties Union sued the school board, claiming the stickers violate the separation of church and state. The trial was resolved in January 2005 when U.S. District Judge Clarence Cooper ruled the sticker was unconstitutional. In the verdict he wrote, "By denigrating evolution, the school board appears to be endorsing the well-known prevailing alternative theory, creationism or variations thereof, even though the sticker does not specifically reference any alternative theories." In December 2005 the federal appeal court panel made comments sharply criticising the lower court ruling in advance of releasing their decision. Judge Ed Carnes said that the words on the sticker are "technically accurate," and that "From nonlife to life is the greatest gap in scientific theory. There is less evidence supporting it than there is for other theories. It sounds to me like evolution is more vulnerable and deserves more critical thinking," suggesting that he did not understand the distinction between evolution and abiogenesis. In December 2006 Cobb County School Board agreed to settle the long-running legal case. The county will not order the placement of "any stickers, labels, stamps, inscriptions, or other warnings or disclaimers bearing language substantially similar to that used on the sticker that is the subject of this action."

===== 2003 Texas State Board of Education, textbook controversy =====
In 2003 The Texas State Board of Education was considering 11 different textbooks for inclusion in the 2004-2005 school year. Fellows of the Discovery Institute testified to the Board that whatever textbooks are adopted should introduce statements on the "weaknesses of the theory of evolution" and include "competing theories, such as intelligent design." The DI had strong interest in the Texas debate because the state is the second largest purchaser of textbooks in the country. Thus any changes publishers make to cater to the state would likely be seen elsewhere.

===== 2004/2005 Richard Sternberg =====
The Sternberg peer review controversy arose over whether an article published in a scientific journal that supported the controversial concept of intelligent design was properly peer-reviewed. The journal's editor, Richard Sternberg, was an active proponent of intelligent design with ties to the Discovery Institute, and the article's author, Stephen C. Meyer, is an official of the Discovery Institute. The journal's publisher ultimately withdrew Meyer's article saying Sternberg published it outside of the normal review process, a statement Sternberg disputes.

In the course of his defense Sternberg claimed he was the subject of religious discrimination due to his belief in intelligent design by the Smithsonian Institution's National Museum of Natural History, where he served as an unpaid research associate. Sternberg's claim is contradicted by John G. West, Vice President and Senior Fellow of the Discovery Institute and Associate Director of the Institute's Center for Science & Culture who wrote, "The first misunderstanding is the belief that intelligent design is based on religion rather than science. Intelligent design is a scientific inference based on empirical evidence, not on religious texts." Despite West's clear rejection of Sternberg's claim, Republican representatives, other Discovery Institute affiliates and intelligent design advocates Mark Souder and Rick Santorum authored a report supporting Sternberg's claim of discrimination. The report was commissioned by Souder in his capacity as subcommittee chairman of the House of Representatives Committee on Government Reform but published by Souder as an individual representative without it gaining any official standing by the Committee, which never formally accepted it.

===== 2005 Pennsylvania, House Bill 1007 =====
On March 16, 2005, a bill, HB 1007, promoting "intelligent design" creationism was introduced in the Pennsylvania House of Representatives and referred to the Education Committee. If enacted, HB 1007 would add a section ("Teaching Theories on the Origin of Man and Earth") to the Public School Code of 1949. That new section would allow school boards to add "intelligent design" to any curriculum containing evolution and allow teachers to use, subject to the approval of the board, "supporting evidence deemed necessary for instruction on the theory of intelligent design." The term "intelligent design" is not defined in the bill. Presumably attempting to prevent a challenge to its constitutionality, HB 1007 explicitly states, "When providing supporting evidence on the theory of intelligent design, no teacher in a public school may stress any particular denominational, sectarian or religious belief."

In June 2005 John G. West and Seth Cooper of the Discovery Institute wrote a letter to Pennsylvania Representative Jess M. Stairs urging Stairs and the Pennsylvania legislature not to pass HB1007. This reflects a shift in the strategy of the intelligent design proponents. Anticipating legal challenges to the constitutionality of laws that mandate teaching of intelligent design, proponents feel including intelligent design content in science curricula under the guise of "scientific criticisms" or "evidence against evolution," within the pretense of "teaching the controversy" is a more defensible strategy.

===== 2005 Kansas evolution hearings =====
A series of hearings instigated by the Discovery Institute held in Topeka, Kansas May 2005 by the Kansas State Board of Education to review changes how the origin of life would be taught in the state's public high school science classes. The hearings were boycotted by the scientific community, and views expressed represented largely those of intelligent design advocates. The result of the hearings was the adoption of new science standards by the fundamentalist-dominated board in defiance of the State Board Science Hearing Committee that relied upon the institute's Critical Analysis of Evolution lesson plan and adopted the institute's Teach the Controversy approach. In August 2006 conservative Republicans lost their majority on the board in a primary election. The moderate Republican and Democrats gaining seats vowed to overturn the 2005 school science standards and adopt those recommended by a State Board Science Hearing Committee that were rejected by the previous board.

On the 13th of February, 2007, the Kansas State Board of Education approved a new curriculum which removed any reference to Intelligent Design as part of science. In the words of Dr Bill Wagnon, the board chairman, "Today the Kansas Board of Education returned its curriculum standards to mainstream science". The new curriculum, as well as a document outlining the differences with the previous curriculum, has been posted on the Kansas State Department of Education's website.

===== 2005/2004 Dover, Pennsylvania Board of Education =====
In 2004 the Dover, Pennsylvania Board of Education passed a resolution requiring 9th grade biology teachers to read a statement that the Pennsylvania Academic Standards require the teaching of evolution, but then the statement proceeds to seed doubts about evolution's validity and directs students to study intelligent design and the intelligent design textbook Of Pandas and People as an alternative. Three of the school board members in the minority of the vote resigned in protest, and science teachers in the district refused to read the statement to their ninth-grade students, citing the Pennsylvania code of education, which states that teachers cannot present information they believe to be false. Instead, the statement was read to students by a school administrator.

The American Civil Liberties Union filed a lawsuit on behalf of eleven parents contending that the school board policy violates the First Amendment. A hearing (Kitzmiller et al. v. Dover Area School District) in Federal District Court was scheduled for September 2005.

The school board claims there are "gaps" in evolution, which it emphasizes is a theory rather than established fact, and that students have a right to consider other views on the origins of life. The school board claims it does not teach intelligent design but simply makes students aware of its existence as an alternative to evolution. It denies intelligent design is "religion in disguise," despite being represented in court by the Thomas More Law Center, a conservative Christian nonprofit which says it uses litigation to promote "the religious freedom of Christians and time-honored family values."

The Discovery Institute's John West said the case displayed the ACLU's "Orwellian" effort to stifle scientific discourse and objected to the issue being decided in court. "It's a disturbing prospect that the outcome of this lawsuit could be that the court will try to tell scientists what is legitimate scientific inquiry and what is not," West said. "That is a flagrant assault on free speech." Opponents, represented by the American Association for the Advancement of Science and the National Association of Biology Teachers contend that his statement is not just ironic, but hypocritical, considering that the Discovery Institute not only tries to tell scientists and academics what is legitimate scientific inquiry and what is not (in disputing philosophical naturalism), but as a matter of policy seeks to redefine what constitutes legitimate science.

In May, 2005, the publisher of Of Pandas and People, the Foundation for Thought and Ethics (FTE), filed a motion seeking to intervene in the case. FTE argued that a ruling that "intelligent design" was religious would have severe financial consequences, citing possible losses in the neighborhood of half a million dollars. By intervening, FTE would have become a co-defendant with the Dover Area School Board, and able to bring its own lawyers and expert witnesses to the case. FTE's president Jon Buell implied that if allowed to intervene, FTE would bring William A. Dembski and Stephen C. Meyer as expert witnesses. In his decision on the motion, Judge John E. Jones III ruled that FTE was not entitled to intervene in the case because its motion to intervene was not timely, describing FTE's excuses for not trying to become involved earlier as "both unavailing and disingenuous." Judge Jones also held that FTE failed to demonstrate that it has "a significantly protectable interest in the litigation warranting intervention as a party" and that its interests will not be adequately represented by the defendants.

In a November 2005 election the citizens of Dover voted out their pro-intelligent design schoolboard.

On December 20, 2005, U.S. District Judge John E. Jones III, in his 139-page ruling on Kitzmiller v. Dover Area School District, struck down the school board's policy requiring a statement be read endorsing intelligent design as an alternative to evolution in 9th grade high school biology classes. In his ruling Jones wrote that intelligent design is not science and is essentially religious in nature. In response the Discovery Institute accused Judge Jones of being an "activist judge".

===== 2006 Ohio - Proposed Template for Ohio Teachers =====
A 2006 proposal before the Ohio Board of Education drafted by Conservative Board member Colleen Grady, would create a "template" based on the Discovery Institute's Critical Analysis of Evolution lesson plan for use by 10th-grade science teachers for classroom discussions evolution, global warming, stem-cell research and cloning.

Grady's proposal was widely regarded as an attempt to circumvent the board's February 2006 vote to retract a controversial model lesson plan and to remove the indicator on which it was based from the standards; the indicator, which called for students to be able to "describe how scientists continue to investigate and critically analyze aspects of evolutionary theory," was generally criticized as providing a pretext for instilling scientifically unwarranted doubts about evolution.

Critics have noted that Grady's proposal will allow for the introduction of intelligent design in public schools, although the executive director of the Intelligent Design Network of Ohio, Roddy Bullock, says that the template would merely permit criticism of evolution, via a Teach the Controversy approach. However, in noting that the purpose of the template is to "open up these topics to different points of view, to different lines of evidence, to different interpretations of the evidence, to give students a more objective approach to science education," and given that outside of creationism and intelligent design there are no alternatives to evolution, various groups such as Americans United for Separation of Church and State are in opposition to the proposal.

In fact, on July 11, Americans United for Separation of Church and State filed a request under the Ohio open records law asking for copies of the Grady proposal as well as all documents and correspondence by the Board of Education and the Department of Education relating to proposed changes to the state’s science standards. The group's executive director, Rev. Barry W. Lynn, urged the Ohio board to reject any effort to reopen the dispute over science education, noting "Public school students in Ohio deserve sound science education, not religious dogma masquerading as science. It’s time for Religious Right allies on the board to drop their unwise agenda and focus on policies that will benefit all of Ohio’s students."

===== 2007 Mississippi, House Bill 625 =====
Representative Mike Lott (R-District 104) introduced House Bill 625 on January 9, 2007. If enacted the bill would "authorize local school boards to allow for the teaching of creationism or intelligent design." Lott was quoted as saying, "The school board of a school district may allow the teaching of creationism or intelligent design in the schools within the district. However, if the theory of evolution is required to be taught as part of the school district's science curriculum, in order to provide students with a comprehensive education in science, the school board also must include the teaching of creationism or intelligent design in the science curriculum". Similar bills to include the teaching of creationism and intelligent design in public classrooms were submitted in 2002, 2003, 2004, and 2005. None were adopted.

===== 2009 Florida Senate Bill =====
In February 2009 Senator Stephen Wise announced that he was sponsoring plans to introduce a bill requiring teachers who teach evolution to also discuss the idea of intelligent design.

===== 2025 North Dakota, Senate Bill 2355 =====
State Senator Michael Dwyer (R-District 47) introduced Senate Bill 2355 four days after the second inauguration of Donald Trump, on January 24, 2025. This bill as proposed would require a change to the state science content standards mandating that intelligent design be included and be taught as "a viable scientific theory." It passed through committee before failing on the second reading one month after it was introduced.

==== Intelligent design lawsuits ====
===== The Dover trial =====
In 2005, the constitutionality of presenting intelligent design in public high school science classes as a valid scientific alternative to evolution was considered by the court in Kitzmiller v. Dover Area School District, the "Dover trial." There plaintiffs successfully argued that intelligent design is a form of creationism, and that the school board policy requiring the presentation of intelligent design as an alternative to evolution as an "explanation of the origin of life" thus violated the Establishment Clause of the First Amendment to the United States Constitution. In his ruling, the judge found that intelligent design is not science and is essentially religious in nature and that "ID’s backers have sought to avoid the scientific scrutiny, which we have now determined that it cannot withstand, by advocating that the controversy, but not ID itself, should be taught in science class. This tactic is at best disingenuous, and at worst a canard. The goal of the IDM is not to encourage critical thought, but to foment a revolution which would supplant evolutionary theory with ID."

===== 2005 University of California at Berkeley suit =====
In October 2005, the National Science Foundation and the University of California, Berkeley’s Museum of Paleontology were sued by intelligent design proponents for running a website for school teachers called 'Understanding Evolution'. The lawsuit was brought by Jeanne Caldwell and Larry Caldwell, the husband and wife founders of the anti-evolution, pro-intelligent design group Quality Science Education for All. The Caldwells argued that University of California was "taking a position on evolution and attempting to persuade minor students to accept that position." Michael R. Smith, the assistant chancellor for legal affairs at Berkeley, said that the university would defend the lawsuit "with vigor and enthusiasm."

The suit alleged that a university-maintained webpage that contains statements from 17 religious organizations endorsing the teaching of evolution and in so doing violated the separation of church and state. The Caldwells objected specifically to one web page that says it's a misconception that science and religion are incompatible.

"Basically, what we have is a page that deals with the misconceptions and challenges to the teaching of evolution, and we provided resources to teachers to answer them," said Roy Caldwell. "One of those questions is, 'Aren't religion and evolution incompatible?' and we say, 'no,' and point to a number of sites by clerics and others who make that point."

The plaintiffs alleged that these statements constituted a preference for certain religious viewpoints in violation of the Establishment Clause of the First Amendment to the United States Constitution. The suit was dismissed 13 March 2006 when judge granted the University of California's motion to dismiss the case on the grounds that the plaintiffs lacked standing.

== See also ==
- Anti-evolution legislation
- Creation and evolution in public education
