= Biologic Institute =

Promoter of pseudo-scientific arguments for creationism

The Biologic Institute (Note: Occasionally, the word for "biological" in foreign languages is mis-translated into English as "biologic", leading to other instances of "Biologic Institutes" erroneously appearing in the literature. For example, a "Biological Institute" at University of Oslo, the Carlsberg Foundation, in Brazil or in Mexico is therefore sometimes mistakenly described as a "Biologic Institute".) was a section of the Discovery Institute created to give the organization a facade of conducting biological research with the aim of producing experimental evidence of intelligent design creationism, funded by the Discovery Institute. It claimed offices in Redmond, Washington and laboratories in the Fremont neighborhood of Seattle, Washington. Instead Biologic Institute consisted solely of a rented office space in Redmond which is no longer in use for several years (since at least 2015) although the web domain is still renewed. The 'research' listed for the group consists mainly of random and often irrelevant works by Intelligent Design supporters going back to their graduate school years. Several are notably articles, books or internally published content from Discovery's 'BioComplexity' journal which is not a legitimate scientific journal.

== Origin and goals ==
The original Discovery Institute plan laid out in the Wedge Document, leaked in 1999, called for Douglas Axe, the current Biologic Institute director, senior researcher and spokesman, to head up a research effort in support of intelligent design. However, the Discovery Institute did not begin executing this part of the Wedge Strategy plan until 2005.

The Biologic Institute was announced in mid-2005, and incorporated in Washington in October 2005 as a charitable organization working on research on birth defects and genetic diseases. Axe told New Scientist magazine that the purpose of the Biologic Institute "is to show that the design perspective can lead to better science", and stated that the Biologic Institute will "contribute substantially to the scientific case for intelligent design". In spite of the Discovery Institute funding, Axe and Discovery spokesperson Rob Crowther are adamant that the Biologic Institute is a "separate entity".

== Staff ==
Axe received a PhD in Chemical Engineering from the California Institute of Technology in 1990. In addition, the Biologic Institute has at least two other researchers. Ann Gauger is a zoologist with a BS in biology from MIT and a 1989 PhD from the University of Washington. As a post-doctoral fellow at Harvard she cloned and characterized the Drosophila kinesin light chain. Her research has been published in Nature, Development, and the Journal of Biological Chemistry. Brendan Dixon is a software developer and worked for Microsoft previously.

Axe, Gauger and Dixon were not among those who signed the original version of the Discovery Institute petition, "A Scientific Dissent from Darwinism", in 2001. However, Gauger appears on the March 2004 and January 2005 versions of the list. The August 25, 2007 version of the "Darwin Dissent" petition includes the names of both Axe and Gauger. Gauger's affiliation on the August 25, 2007 version of the petition is not the Biologic Institute, but Gauger's alma mater, the University of Washington.

Dixon is the president and sole employee of the Lifeworks Foundation, which in 2006 made $700,000 in donations to the Discovery Institute's Center for Science and Culture, and of $30,000 to Baylor University for one of its engineering professors, Robert J. Marks II, to employ intelligent design proponent William Dembski as a postdoctoral researcher within the Evolutionary Informatics Lab he was forming. Thereafter, Baylor shut the lab down, deleted its website and returned the grant, in an incident that the Discovery Institute is publicising as one of their campaigns claiming discrimination.

== New Scientist investigation ==
New Scientist magazine sent a reporter to the Biologic Institute facilities in late 2006 to investigate. The reporter, Celeste Biever, was given a fairly chilly reception and found few willing to speak to her about their research. Although the New Scientist article was somewhat negative, the Discovery Institute touted it as unequivocal evidence that the Biologic Institute is engaging in scientific research.

The only one of the four Biologic Institute directors willing to speak to New Scientist reporter Biever was George Weber, a retired member of the business faculty at Whitworth University, a private Christian college associated with the Presbyterian Church (USA) in Spokane, Washington. Weber belongs to the Spokane chapter of Reasons To Believe, an evangelical Christian old-earth creationist organization. Weber stated that, "We are the first ones doing what we might call lab science in intelligent design" and "The objective is to challenge the scientific community on naturalism." After speaking to New Scientist, Weber left the board of the Biologic Institute. Axe explained in an email to Biever that this was because Weber "was found to have seriously misunderstood the purpose of Biologic and to have misrepresented it."

The Discovery Institute stated in October 2006 that intelligent design research is being conducted by the institute in secret to avoid the scrutiny of the scientific community. Nevertheless, Biever was able to discover that The Biologic Institute is working on "examining the origin of metabolic pathways in bacteria, the evolution of gene order in bacteria, and the evolution of protein folds" and computational biology.

New Scientist also wrote an editorial in the same issue as its 2006 report of the Biologic Institute activities, titled "It's still all about religion". The editorial expressed concern about the interpretations and spin that might be given to any research results that might come out of research funded by the Discovery Institute, and suggested that the research efforts will not benefit science. Axe, Dixon and Gauger responded to the New Scientist article and editorial in a letter published January 13, 2007.

== Reception ==
Scientists, intelligent design supporters, other creationists and the religious community have received news of the Biologic Institute with a variety of comments. Several have pointed out that the development of a Discovery Institute research laboratory and research program is somewhat belated. It has also been noted that other creationist organizations like the Institute for Creation Research, Creation Research Society and the Geoscience Research Institute (part of the Seventh-day Adventist Loma Linda University) have had research programs for a long time.

University of Warwick sociologist Steve Fuller, who testified in support of intelligent design at the Kitzmiller v. Dover trial, opines that research at the Biologic Institute will reduce tensions between scientists and the religious community. Fuller states that "Regardless of whether the science cuts any ice against evolution, one of the virtues is that it could provide a kind of model for how religiously motivated people can go into the lab." Robin Collins, a philosopher at Messiah College in Grantham, Pennsylvania, applauds the efforts of the Biologic Institute to find patterns in nature that cannot be explained by neo-Darwinian evolution. Collins claims that the progress made by physics over the last few centuries results from assuming that the universe and physical laws are intelligently designed.

The scientific community remains skeptical and commentators note that no publications containing results which support intelligent design have yet appeared. Reason magazine compared the research efforts at the Biologic Institute to those of "Big Tobacco" and the 2006 New Scientist editorial noted that this sort of research is similar to the agenda-driven research of the tobacco and oil industries. University of Minnesota biology professor PZ Myers likens the Biologic Institute's research program to cargo cults, with "Intelligent Design creationists pretend[ing] that they're doing science."

Gauger reported on her work at the Wistar Retrospective Symposium held from June 3 through June 7, 2007 in Boston, Massachusetts. As reported by Daniel Brooks, "...she discussed "leaky growth," in microbial colonies at high densities, leading to horizontal transfer of genetic information, and announced that under such conditions she had actually found a novel variant that seemed to lead to enhanced colony growth. Gunther Wagner said, "So, a beneficial mutation happened right in your lab?" at which point the moderator halted questioning." Gauger herself has reported a different take on this meeting, saying that the point was not whether there was a beneficial mutation (which Gauger agrees there was) but whether or not the organism had manufactured a new way to make biotin, which it had not (it had merely been able to better scavenge it from the environment). Additionally, Brooks implied that the questioning was cut short because of the question, while Gauger holds that this was simply an amusing question at the end of the session.

== Laboratory photograph controversy ==
On December 18, 2012, the science and technology blog Ars Technica ran an exposé featuring a photograph of Gauger on the Biologic Institute's website. The image appeared to show her standing in a laboratory in the Biologic Institute. Ars Technica revealed that it was actually a composite photograph of her face superimposed over a stock photograph sourced from the stock photo agency Shutterstock. After the story spread throughout the internet, the Biologic Institute removed the image from their website.
