= A Scientific Support for Darwinism =

A Scientific Support for Darwinism (And For Public Schools Not To Teach "Intelligent Design" As Science) was a four-day, word-of-mouth petition of scientists in support of evolution. Inspired by Project Steve, it was initiated in 2005 by archaeologist R. Joe Brandon to produce a public response to the Discovery Institute's 2001 petition A Scientific Dissent From Darwinism.

The Discovery Institute's petition was publicized in 2005 by media coverage of the Discovery Institute's efforts to introduce intelligent design in science classrooms and the opposition to those efforts in the Kitzmiller v. Dover Area School District case. Brandon noticed that only about 80 of those appearing on the Dissent petition had expertise in an area relevant to evolution. Therefore, Brandon decided to create a petition of his own of scientists supporting evolution. The petition was hosted at ShovelBums.org, but has since been removed from the site.

A total of 7,733 scientists signed a statement affirming their support for evolution over a four-day period.

== Statement ==
The statement was entitled A Scientific Support for Darwinism And For Public Schools Not To Teach "Intelligent Design" As Science, and read:

This petition is in response to the Discovery Institute's petition "A Scientific Dissent From Darwinism" signed, since 2001, by 400 scientists, as of July 2005. That petition is presented to the public as a scientific endorsement of the religion-based concept of intelligent design over Darwinism (read more). Unfortunately, the majority, 83%, of these 'scientists' are not schooled in the fields that utilize evolutionary theory in detail, nor even in science, and they are not qualified to present their ideas in a way other than personal opinion. We feel this petition is misleading the public, and we use this petition to show that:

Our Petition:

"We, as scientists trained in fields that utilize evolutionary theory, do not consider Intelligent Design to be a fact-based science appropriate for teaching in public schools because it is theistic in nature, not empirical, and therefore does not pass the rigors of scientific hypothesis testing and theory development. As such, we petition that Intelligent Design not be presented in public schools as a viable science within the scientific curriculum."

"This petition does not represent an atheistic or exclusionary scientific school of thought, and we do not endorse Intelligent Design, or other religious subjects, being prohibited from discussion in the appropriate classroom setting. Indeed many of us belong to religious denominations, and we respect and support individuals' rights to put evolution, the origins of the universe, and life, into a context that they understand as defined by their religion. Science, however, is not designed to explain or debunk religious concepts that are based in faith, and, as such, religion-based concepts should not be taught as science."

== Results ==
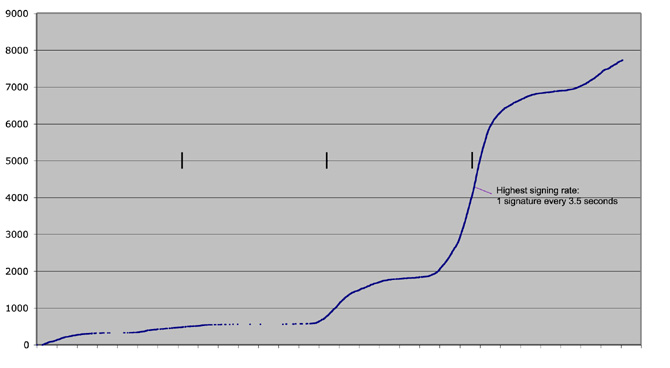
A graph showing the number of signatures over four days

In four days in the fall of 2005, starting on September 28, 2005, and ending at 4:09 pm Eastern Time, October 1, 2005, the petition supporting "Darwinism" gathered 7,733 verified signatures from concerned scientists. Of these, 6,965 were US residents and 4,066 had PhDs. The "Four Day Petition" was carried out with no outside funding or assistance of any professional society. The effort was carried out by email and word-of-mouth.

Among the signatories were 21 U.S. National Academy of Sciences members, nine MacArthur Fellowship awardees, and a Nobel laureate. According to Brandon's analysis, of those who signed his petition, there were

1. 3,385 with biology in their title
2. 850 with anthropology/archaeology
3. 680 with evolutionary & ecology
4. 394 from the field of genetics
5. 270 from geology and related fields
6. 234 from the fields of physics, astronomy, or space sciences
7. 111 chemists
8. 110 psychologists
9. 75 computer scientists
10. 50 engineers

Therefore, about 68 percent of those signing the Brandon petition work in biology-related fields (using the first four categories from the list above).

This "Scientific Support" petition collected signatures at a rapid pace. The responses to the Brandon petition arrived at a rate 697,000% faster than the signatures collected on the Discovery Institute Darwin Dissent petition.

== History ==
Brandon's original goal was to get 400 petition signatures in four hours. However, Brandon found he was 75 signatures short after four hours, and so he decided to extend his collection period to four days. The emails became more frequent, and at one point, petition responses were arriving every 3.5 seconds. However, the 325 signatures collected in the first four hours can be compared to the Discovery Institute's gathering of 400 signatures of self-identified scientists, most in irrelevant fields, in four years. In the week after the close of the four-day period, another several thousand signatures arrived, but were not included in the official tally.

One signatory, Steve Brill of Rutgers University, stated,

To be called a scientific theory, Intelligent Design must be at the very least, disprovable. Since there is no way for Intelligent Design to be disproved, it fails the simplest test of scientific theory.

In a press release on October 20, 2005, announcing the results of the "Four Day Petition", Brandon acadrew attention to the remarks of Discovery Institute Senior Fellow Michael Behe's faculty colleagues in the biological sciences at Lehigh University. Twenty of Behe's peers remarked collectively that

As Michael J. Behe's faculty colleagues... we lend our voices to the chorus of nearly all scientists who conclude that 'Intelligent Design' is not a scientific theory, but rather a loosely veiled attempt to explain natural phenomena by invoking the concept of a supernatural entity. Intelligent Design is not a scientific alternative to Darwinian evolution and has no place in the biology classroom.

Another signatory, biologist Mark Siddall of the American Museum of Natural History stated,

This is not a fight about what the nature of science is. Scientists have already determined that. It's a fight about what our daughters and sons will be taught is the nature of science.

Siddall added "R. Joe's efforts elicited an overwhelming response from the scientific community—one that cut across lines of faith as deeply as it did across fields of scientific study." Siddall also assisted Brandon in checking that the IP addresses of the respondents corresponded to the institutions they claimed to be affiliated with.

Brandon's original plan was to compile the signatures that he obtained and pass them on to Judge John E. Jones III who was handling the Kitzmiller v. Dover Area School District case, as well as announce the results in a press release. The petition was not completed sufficiently early to submit it as part of an Amicus curiae brief for the Dover case. However, if the case was to go to the US Supreme Court, the petition could have been submitted as an amicus brief at that time.

R. Joe Brandon emphasized that this "Four Day Petition" did not mean that scientific issues are settled by majority vote. What Brandon maintains is that this is an indication of the level of scientific consensus that accepts evolution as a viable established scientific theory that has passed a large number of hurdles and is supported by an immense amount of evidence.

== See also ==
- Clergy Letter Project
- Creation–evolution controversy
- Intelligent design movement
- Level of support for evolution
