= Biological Society of Washington =

Scientific organisation headquartered in Washington, D.C.

Logo of The Biological Society of Washington

The Biological Society of Washington is a worldwide acting scientific organization established on 3 December 1880 in Washington, D.C., United States. The original purpose was "to encourage the study of the Biological Sciences and to hold meetings at which papers shall be read and discussed." The current primary function is "the furtherance of taxonomic study and the diffusion of taxonomic knowledge."

In May 1882 the first issue of the peer reviewed journal Proceedings of the Biological Society of Washington was published. It appeared quarterly. The publication of Volume 134 in 2021 was the final issue of the journal. Another journal is the Bulletin of the Biological Society of Washington which is published since 1918 and contains larger studies, symposia proceedings and special study collections. The Biological Society of Washington was among the eight organisations which founded the Washington Academy of Sciences in 1898. The governing council of the society includes the elected officers and selected local members. The first elected president was George Brown Goode and the first recording secretary was Richard Rathbun. Later well-known presidents include Frederick Vernon Coville, Edward William Nelson, Ned Hollister, Clinton Hart Merriam, William Healey Dall, Andrew Delmar Hopkins, Theodore Gill, Barton Warren Evermann, Richard C. Banks, Leonhard Hess Stejneger, and Charles Abiathar White.

The Biological Society of Washington has currently about 250 members, including a number of staff members of the Smithsonian Institution, the United States National Museum as well as members of the USDA and the United States Department of the Interior.

In 2004 the Biological Society of Washington made headlines for the Sternberg peer review controversy when the Proceedings of the Biological Society of Washington published a peer-reviewed paper in support of intelligent design.

== See also ==
- Society of Biology
- Society for Experimental Biology
