= Sternberg peer review controversy =

Controversy over publication of an intelligent design article in a scientific journal

Full preclosure report by U.S. Office of Special Counsel

The Sternberg peer review controversy concerns the conflict arising from the publication of an article supporting pseudoscientific intelligent design creationism in a scientific journal, and the subsequent questions of whether proper editorial procedures had been followed and whether it was properly peer reviewed.

On 4 August 2004, an article by Stephen C. Meyer (Director of Discovery Institute's Center for Science and Culture) titled "The origin of biological information and the higher taxonomic categories", appeared in the peer-reviewed journal, Proceedings of the Biological Society of Washington. Meyer's article was a literature review article, and contained no new primary scholarship itself on the topic of intelligent design. The following month, the publisher of the journal, the Council of the Biological Society of Washington, released a statement repudiating the article and stating that their former editor, biologist Richard M. Sternberg, handled the entire review process in an unusual manner, without consultation or review from an associate editor. The position of editor was unpaid and voluntary, and Sternberg had put in his resignation from it six months earlier. Sternberg disputes the Council's statement and asserts that the paper was appropriately peer reviewed by three biologists who "concluded that [the paper] warranted publication".

The same statement from the Council vowed that proper review procedures would be followed in the future and endorsed a resolution published by the American Association for the Advancement of Science, which states that there is no credible scientific evidence supporting intelligent design. On September 18, the Discovery Institute issued a statement praising the publication of Meyer's paper in a peer-reviewed journal and chastising the National Center for Science Education for stating that the paper should not have been published. The Biological Society of Washington's president, Roy McDiarmid, called Sternberg's decision to publish Meyer's article "a really bad judgment call on the editor's part" and said it was doubtful whether the three scientists who peer reviewed the article and recommended it for publication were evolutionary biologists.

The event has been used to support an unsubstantiated but common narrative of persecution.

== Background ==
=== Richard M. Sternberg ===
Richard M. Sternberg is an American evolutionary biologist who has completed a BS degree from University of South Carolina and has two PhDs: the first from 1995 in molecular evolution from Florida International University, and a second in systems science from Binghamton University. He did post-doctoral work between 1999 and 2001 at the National Museum of Natural History (NMNH) at the Smithsonian Institution, on the phylogeny of crabs.

In February 2001 he began work as an invertebrate taxonomist for the National Institutes of Health at the National Center for Biotechnology Information, later becoming a staff scientist. The position allowed time for research work, and he continued at the NMNH, now as an unpaid research associate. Soon after starting work, he agreed to take on the unpaid position of Managing Editor of the peer-reviewed scientific journal, Proceedings of the Biological Society of Washington, a taxonomic journal which usually publishes descriptions of newly identified species. Also in 2001, he joined the editorial board of the Baraminology Study Group, a young earth creationist "creation science" attempt to identify and classify the created kinds mentioned in scripture. He has stated that he is an outside critic and remained skeptical of their young earth beliefs. Around this time he was sympathetic to historic ideas of structuralism of patterns in nature, but could not go from that to inferring the existence of a designer. He occasionally met proponents of intelligent design, and in 2002 presented a lecture on formal causation to the ISCID intelligent design group's "Research And Progress in Intelligent Design" (RAPID) conference.

In October 2003 Sternberg resigned from being editor of the Proceedings of the Biological Society of Washington, with a commitment to edit issues over the coming year. Early in 2004 intelligent design advocate Stephen C. Meyer contacted Sternberg about a manuscript that he was thinking of submitting to the journal. Sternberg advised him he would have to become a member of the Society, and in a few weeks Meyer sent him copies of the manuscript with evidence of membership. Sternberg went ahead with the review and editing process, and Meyer's article appeared in the journal on 4 August 2004. This was already scheduled to be the second last issue that Sternberg would edit. In a statement issued by 10 October 2004 the journal declared that Sternberg had published the paper at his own discretion without following the usual practice of review by an associate editor. The Council and associate editors would have considered the subject of the paper inappropriate for publication as it was significantly outside "the nearly purely systematic content" of the journal. The Council endorsed a resolution "which observes that there is no credible scientific evidence supporting ID as a testable hypothesis", and that the paper therefore "does not meet the scientific standards of the Proceedings".

Sternberg continued in his job as a staff scientist at the National Center for Biotechnology Information until 2007, and continued to hold the unpaid position of Research Associate at the NMNH, which was extended on 15 November 2006 by a further three year appointment as an unpaid 'research collaborator' at the NMNH. After 2007 Sternberg became a research scientist at the intelligent design Biologic Institute, supported by a research fellowship from the Discovery Institute's Center for Science and Culture, of which Stephen Meyer is a co-founder and currently director.

Sternberg is a Roman Catholic "who attends Mass." He subscribes to the process structuralism school of thought. In 2005 he said he was not a proponent of intelligent design. He has more recently described his position as one that "can accept all that is empirically valid in evolutionary biology, while not axiomatically dismissing the position that structures as well as their "real" instantiations have an intelligent cause", and asserts that the universe emanates from Nous (mind), so that his thinking "is compatible with intelligent design broadly defined". Sternberg serves as a fellow of the International Society for Complexity, Information and Design (ISCID), an intelligent design group. He is also a signatory to the Discovery Institute's Scientific Dissent from Darwinism petition.

== The peer review process ==
Sternberg insists the paper was properly peer reviewed, and rejects the reason given by the journal for disavowing the article, saying:

As managing editor it was my prerogative to choose the editor who would work directly on the paper, and as I was best qualified among the editors I chose myself.

A series of articles in Skeptic criticized the decision to publish the article. Michael Shermer disputed Sternberg's qualifications as a peer reviewer, stating that it dealt less with the areas Sternberg was qualified to review (systematics and taxonomy) than it did paleontology, for which many members of the society would have been better qualified to peer review the paper; at that time the Society had three members who were experts on Cambrian invertebrates, the subject discussed in Meyer's paper. A follow-up article by Ed Brayton criticized Sternberg's decision to review the paper, given his ties to a known movement that opposes the theory of evolution:

Sternberg argues that he had the authority to publish Meyer's paper. But having that authority does not excuse the professional and ethical misjudgments. If you know that the publication of a pro-ID paper in a Smithsonian journal is going to cause an outcry, and you have close ties to the ID movement and to the author of this paper specifically, the ethical thing to do would be to excuse yourself from handling that paper and allow someone without those personal and professional ties to the author and subject of the paper to decide whether it should be published. Thus, Sternberg's decision to publish the paper without the normal peer-review process is a flagrant breach of professional ethics that brought disrepute to the Smithsonian.

— Ed Brayton, The Richard Sternberg Affair

Doubts were raised whether the reviewers were evolutionary biologists. According to an article by the Society of Academic Authors Meyer said the article grew out of a presentation he made at a conference attended by Richard Sternberg where they discussed the possibility of a paper for society's journal. Observers have pointed to affiliations that in most circumstances would have disqualified Sternberg from reviewing an article on intelligent design. They note that Sternberg is a Fellow of the International Society for Complexity, Information and Design, a Discovery Institute-affiliated group dedicated to promoting intelligent design. Sternberg is also a signatory of the Discovery Institute's A Scientific Dissent From Darwinism statement "We are skeptical of claims for the ability of random mutation and natural selection to account for the complexity of life. Careful examination of the evidence for Darwinian theory should be encouraged."

Sternberg claims to have also checked with a Council member and to have followed the standard practice for peer review:

Three reviewers responded and were willing to review the paper; all are experts in relevant aspects of evolutionary and molecular biology and hold full-time faculty positions in major research institutions, one at an Ivy League university, another at a major North American public university, a third on a well-known overseas research faculty. There was substantial feedback from reviewers to the author, resulting in significant changes to the paper. The reviewers did not necessarily agree with Dr. Meyer's arguments or his conclusion but all found the paper meritorious and concluded that it warranted publication...four well-qualified biologists with five PhDs in relevant disciplines were of the professional opinion that the paper was worthy of publication.

Of the four "well-qualified biologists with five PhDs" Sternberg identifies, one was Sternberg himself, contributing his double doctorate to the total he cited. Sternberg's claim of following proper peer review procedures directly contradicts the published public statement of his former employer, the publisher of the journal, that the proper procedures were not followed resulting in the article's retraction. In previous years the Proceedings of the Biological Society of Washington had published yearly lists of all the people who had served as peer reviewers. That list is absent for 2004, the year of the incident. Sternberg has repeatedly refused to identify the three "well-qualified biologists", citing personal concerns over professional repercussions for them. The Office of Special Counsel determined that Sternberg complied with all editorial requirements of the Proceedings and that the Meyer article was properly peer reviewed by renowned scientists.

== Criticism ==
In a review of Meyer's article The origin of biological information and the higher taxonomic categories, Alan Gishlick, Nick Matzke, and Wesley R. Elsberry claimed it contained poor scholarship, that it failed to cite and specifically rebut the actual data supporting evolution, and "constructed a rhetorical edifice out of omission of relevant facts, selective quoting, bad analogies, knocking down straw men, and tendentious interpretations". Further examination of the article revealed that it was substantially similar to previously published articles co-authored by Meyer.

Critics of Sternberg believe that he was biased in the matter, arguing that Sternberg's close personal and ideological connections to the paper's author suggest at least the appearance of conflict of interest. They cite as evidence Sternberg's presentation in 2002 of a lecture on intelligent design at the Research And Progress in Intelligent Design (RAPID) conference where Stephen C. Meyer, the author of the paper Sternberg published, also presented a lecture. The explicit purpose of the RAPID conference was to "form new collaborations among scientists seeking to do research on the interface between science and faith, particularly within the context of ID". Only intelligent design advocates spoke at it, and at least one intelligent design critic was expressly forbidden to attend it. It was organized and hosted by the International Society for Complexity, Information and Design (ISCID), a group dedicated to promoting intelligent design, of which Sternberg is a Fellow. ISCID is affiliated with the Discovery Institute, hub of the intelligent design movement, where Meyer serves as the Program Director of the Center for Science and Culture. Critics also note that Sternberg also sat on the editorial board of the Baraminology Study Group, which studies "creation biology" and whose website is hosted by Bryan College, a conservative Christian school named after William Jennings Bryan, who famously opposed Clarence Darrow in the Scopes Trial.

The American Association for the Advancement of Science, in a position statement describing the events around the controversy, said "Given these associations, Dr. Sternberg would appear to be, at very least, an advocate for 'intelligent design' and critical of standard peer review processes as they bear on the scientific assessment of the 'intelligent design' hypothesis." Critics describe Sternberg's explanation of events, that a pro-intelligent design paper just happened to find its way to a publication with a sympathetic editor ultimately responsible for ensuring proper peer review and editing of his last issue, and that he decided it was appropriate to deal with the review process in person on a subject in which he has a personal interest, as improbable and that "people who want us to believe that the publication process outlined [by Sternberg and his defenders] was transparent and only had to do with science" are "disingenuous".

Journalist Chris Mooney has compared the Sternberg controversy to that of a paper published by climate change deniers Willie Soon and Sallie Baliunas in Climate Change, where a sympathetic editor Chris de Freitas allowed it to be published, despite its lack of scientific merit.

== Smithsonian controversy ==
After the peer review controversy became public, Sternberg filed a religious discrimination complaint against the Smithsonian Institution's National Museum of Natural History, where he had an unpaid appointment as a research associate, while employed by the National Institutes of Health.

Sternberg claims that he was "targeted for retaliation and harassment" and subject to efforts to remove him from the museum in retaliation for his views in support of intelligent design. He continues to cite a letter by the United States Office of Special Counsel as supporting his version of events, despite the fact that the Office of Special Counsel did not proceed beyond its initial investigation. In its initial investigation, Office of Special Counsel concluded that there was a strategy by several managers to force Sternberg out of the Smithsonian Institution and that there was a strong religious and political component to the actions taken after the publication of the Meyer article. For example, one of the emails sent between Smithsonian employees stated, "Scientists have been perfectly willing to let these people alone in their churches, but now it looks like these people are coming out and invading our schools, biology classes, museums and now our professional journals. These people to my mind are only a scale up on the fundies of a more destructive kind in other parts of the world. Depressing. Oh, if we only still had Steve Gould to lead the counter-attack". Pim Van Meurs and other critics observed that the Office of Special Counsel lacked jurisdiction over the matter and so his claim was unlikely to proceed, and that even though it made no official findings or conclusions, the response from the Office of Special Counsel provided Sternberg and the Discovery Institute putative evidence and talking points supporting their claim that the scientific community discriminates against intelligent design proponents. In a Wall Street Journal op-ed article, Discovery Institute Senior Fellow David Klinghoffer portrayed Sternberg as a martyr and victim of discrimination, a tactic used often by design proponents.

In response, Sternberg's supervisor at the Smithsonian, Jonathan Coddington, responded publicly disputing Sternberg's and Klinghoffer's depiction of events. Coddington states that Sternberg was never dismissed, nor was he a paid employee, and that he was never the target of discrimination, and remained serving at the museum up to that time.

In August, 2005 the Office of Special Counsel dropped Sternberg's religious discrimination complaint against the Smithsonian Institution. It was determined that as an unpaid research associate at the Smithsonian, Sternberg was not actually an employee, and thus the Office of Special Counsel had no jurisdiction. Nick Matzke, Jason Rosenhouse and other critics have commented that the Office of Special Counsel itself appears biased in its initial handling of the matter, given the links between the religious right and the Republican Party, with George W. Bush appointee James McVay authoring its opinion.

In a November 2005 National Public Radio report on the affair, Sternberg stated "I'm not an evangelical, I'm not a fundamentalist, I'm not a young earth creationist, I'm not a theistic evolutionist". Sternberg said McVay "related to me, 'the Smithsonian Institution's reaction to your publishing the Meyer article was far worse than you imagined'." Barbara Bradley Hagerty, NPR's religion reporter, said Sternberg himself believes intelligent design is "fatally flawed".

In December 2006 a partisan report was issued by Mark Souder, on the basis of information he and fellow Republican representative and intelligent design advocate Rick Santorum (author of the pro-ID Santorum Amendment) had requested, calling into question the Smithsonian's treatment of Sternberg and repeating many of Sternberg's claims. The report was commissioned by Souder in his capacity as subcommittee chairman of the House of Representatives Committee on Government Reform, written by his subcommittee staff, but published by Souder as an individual representative without it being officially accepted into the Congressional Record. This is contrary to oft-repeated claims by the Discovery Institute and other design proponents that the report represents an official position by the Committee supporting Sternberg's claims of discrimination.

Observers have said that facts of the case simply do not support the conclusions of the report nor is the report an official report of the committee. They say that the Discovery Institute is using the report to portray Sternberg specifically, and design proponents in general, as victims of persecution. They also say the Souder report is a repackaging of the Office of Special Council's previous findings from August 2005 and contains nothing new, consisting of "the OSC findings restated and used as a form of evidence in and of themselves" and attacks the Smithsonian for "not accepting the OSC's findings at face value." They cite as evidence of a biased motive behind the report the longstanding connections of the report's instigators, Congressmen Souder and Santorum, to the Discovery Institute, whose Program Director is Stephen C. Meyer, author of the paper Sternberg published. In 2000 Souder co-hosted a congressional briefing on behalf of the Discovery Institute intended to drum up political support for intelligent design and read a defense of intelligent design prepared by the Discovery Institute into the congressional record. Santorum worked with the Discovery Institute's program director Phillip E. Johnson in 2000 and 2001 drafting the pro-intelligent design Santorum Amendment and in March 2006 wrote the foreword for the book, Darwin's Nemesis: Phillip Johnson And the Intelligent Design Movement a collection of essays largely by Discovery Institute fellows honoring Johnson as "father" of the intelligent design movement. Contained in the appendix to the Souder report is a letter from the director of the Smithsonian where it is revealed that Sternberg demanded that they give him a $300,000 grant to make up for his allegedly lost research time; he was turned down. Sternberg's appointment as a Smithsonian Institution research associate was from January 2004 through January 2007. Research associates are not employees of the Museum and appointments are typically awarded for up to three years.

As one of the Discovery Institute intelligent design campaigns, the Institute conducted extensive lobbying and public relations efforts on Sternberg's behalf, including arranging for articles by Institute Fellows to be published in the mainstream press. The April 2008 film featuring Ben Stein promoting intelligent design, Expelled: No Intelligence Allowed, included interviews with Sternberg and claims that his "life was ruined". Both Scientific American and the National Center for Science Education state that the film misrepresents key facts.
