= A Scientific Dissent from Darwinism =

Statement issued in 2001 by the Discovery Institute

"A Scientific Dissent from Darwinism" (or "Dissent from Darwinism") was a statement issued in 2001 by the Discovery Institute, a creationist think tank based in Seattle, Washington, U.S., best known for its promotion of the pseudoscientific principle of intelligent design. As part of the Discovery Institute's Teach the Controversy campaign, the statement expresses skepticism about the ability of random mutations and natural selection to account for the complexity of life, and encourages careful examination of the evidence for "Darwinism", a term intelligent design proponents use to refer to evolution.

The statement was published in advertisements under an introduction which stated that its signatories dispute the assertion that Darwin's theory of evolution fully explains the complexity of living things, and dispute that "all known scientific evidence supports [Darwinian] evolution". The Discovery Institute states that the list was first started to refute claims made by promoters of the PBS television series "Evolution" that "virtually every scientist in the world believes the theory to be true". Further names of signatories have been added at intervals. The list continues to be used in Discovery Institute intelligent design campaigns in an attempt to discredit evolution and bolster claims that intelligent design is scientifically valid by claiming that evolution lacks broad scientific support.

The statement has been criticized for being misleading and ambiguous, using terms with multiple meanings such as "Darwinism", which can refer specifically to natural selection or informally to evolution in general, and presenting a straw man fallacy with its claim that random mutations and natural selection are insufficient to account for the complexity of life, when standard evolutionary theory involves other factors such as gene flow, genetic recombination, genetic drift and endosymbiosis. Scientists and educators have noted that its signatories, who include historians and philosophers of science as well as scientists, are a minuscule fraction of the numbers of scientists and engineers qualified to sign it. Intelligent design has failed to produce scientific research, and been rejected by the scientific community, including many leading scientific organizations. The statement in the document has also been criticized as being phrased to represent a diverse range of opinions, set in a context which gives it a misleading spin to confuse the public. The listed affiliations and areas of expertise of the signatories have also been criticized.

== Statement ==
"A Scientific Dissent from Darwinism" states that:

We are skeptical of claims for the ability of random mutation and natural selection to account for the complexity of life. Careful examination of the evidence for Darwinian theory should be encouraged.

The statement, and its title, refer to evolution as "Darwinism" or "Darwinian theory", can lead to confusion, due to the terms having various meanings, but commonly meaning evolution due to the mechanism of natural selection rather than the broader definition of evolution, the change in a species' inherited traits from generation to generation. The terms have meant different things to different people at different times. In terms of the history of evolutionary thought, both "Darwinism" and "neo-Darwinism" are predecessors of the current evolutionary theory, the modern evolutionary synthesis. However, in the context of the creation–evolution controversy, the term "Darwinism" is commonly used by creationists to describe scientists and science teachers who oppose them, and to claim that scientific disagreements about the specific mechanism can sometimes be equated to rejection of evolution as a whole. Intelligent design proponents use the term in all these ways, including the idea that it is a materialist ideology, and the claim that as it proposes natural processes as an explanation for evolution, Darwinism can be equated with atheism and presented as being incompatible with Christianity.

Charles Darwin himself described natural selection as being "the main but not exclusive means of modification" of species. The modern theory of evolution includes natural selection and genetic drift as mechanisms, and does not conclude that "the ability of random mutation and natural selection" accounts "for the complexity of life." Southeastern Louisiana University philosophy professor Barbara Forrest and deputy director of the National Center for Science Education Glenn Branch comment on the ambiguity of the statement and its use in the original advertisement:

Such a statement could easily be agreed to by scientists who have no doubts about evolution itself, but dispute the exclusiveness of "Darwinism," that is, natural selection, when other mechanisms such as genetic drift and gene flow are being actively debated. To the layman, however, the ad gives the distinct impression that the 100 scientists question evolution itself.

Skip Evans, also of the National Center for Science Education, noted that when interviewed, several of the scientists who had signed the statement said they accepted common descent. He thus suggests that this confusion has in fact been carefully engineered.

== Discovery Institute usage ==
By promoting a perception that evolution is the subject of wide controversy and debate within the scientific community, whereas in fact evolution is overwhelmingly supported by scientists, the list is used to lend support to other Discovery Institute campaigns promoting intelligent design, including "Teach the Controversy", "Critical Analysis of Evolution", "Free Speech on Evolution", and "Stand Up For Science". For example, in its "Teach the Controversy" campaign, the Institute claims that "evolution is a theory in crisis" and that many scientists criticize evolution and citing the list as evidence or a resource. The Discovery Institute also asserts that this information is being withheld from students in public high school science classes along with "alternatives" to evolution such as intelligent design. The Institute uses "A Scientific Dissent From Darwinism" as evidence to support its claim that evolution is disputed widely within the scientific community. In 2002, Stephen C. Meyer, the founder of the Discovery Institute's Center for Science and Culture, presented the list as evidence to the Ohio Board of Education to promote Teach the Controversy. He cited it as demonstrating that there was a genuine controversy over Darwinian evolution. In the 2005 Kansas evolution hearings Meyer cited the list in support of his assertion that there was "significant scientific dissent from Darwinism" that students should be informed about.

The list was advertised in prominent periodicals such as The New York Review of Books, The New Republic, and The Weekly Standard in October and November 2001, "to rebut bogus claims by Darwinists that no reputable scientists are skeptical of Darwinism" by "producing a list of 100 scientific dissenters." Its initial release was timed to coincide with the airing of the PBS Evolution television series at the end of 2001. The Discovery Institute also launched a tie-in website to promote the list.

The Discovery Institute has continued to collect signatures, reporting 300 in 2004, over 600 in 2006 (from that year on the Discovery Institute began to include non-US scientists on the list), over 700 in 2007, and over 1000 in 2019. The Discovery Institute includes a description of the list in a response to one of its "Top Questions".

The Discovery Institute-related organization Physicians and Surgeons for Scientific Integrity manages "Physicians and Surgeons who Dissent from Darwinism", a similar list for medical professionals. The Discovery Institute compiled and distributed other similarly confusing and misleading lists of local scientists during controversies over evolution education in Georgia, New Mexico, Ohio, and Texas.

== Responses ==
The "Scientific Dissent From Darwinism" document has been widely criticized on several different grounds. First, similar to previous lists produced by other creationists, the professional expertise of those listed is not always apparent and is alleged to be deficient. Also, the professional affiliations and credentials that are claimed for some of the signatories has been questioned. Finally, there appear to be a few who appear on the list who are not firmly committed to the agenda advanced by the Discovery Institute, and who have been misled into signing or who have changed their minds. Russell D. Renka, a political scientist, said that the Discovery Institute presented the list in an appeal to authority to support its anti-evolution viewpoint.

A paper from the Center for Inquiry said that Dissent From Darwinism is one of the Discovery Institute intelligent design campaigns to discredit evolution and bolster claims that intelligent design is scientifically valid by creating the impression that evolution lacks broad scientific support.

In November 2001, the National Center for Science Education stated that the then current version of the document appeared "to be very artfully phrased" to represent a diverse range of opinions, set in a context which gives it a misleading spin to confuse the public.

Writing in Robert T. Pennock's Intelligent Design Creationism and Its Critics, Matthew J. Brauer and Daniel R. Brumbaugh say that intelligent design proponents are "manufacturing dissent" in order to explain the absence of scientific debate of their claims:

The "scientific" claims of such neo-creationists as Johnson, Denton, and Behe rely, in part, on the notion that these issues [surrounding evolution] are the subject of suppressed debate among biologists. ... according to neo-creationists, the apparent absence of this discussion and the nearly universal rejection of neo-creationist claims must be due to the conspiracy among professional biologists instead of a lack of scientific merit.

In their 2010 book Biology and Ideology from Descartes to Dawkins, science and religion scholar Denis Alexander and historian of science Ronald L. Numbers tied the fate of the Dissent to that of the wider intelligent design movement:

After more than a decade of effort the Discovery Institute proudly announced in 2007 that it had got some 700 doctoral-level scientists and engineers to sign "A Scientific Dissent from Darwinism." Though the number may strike some observers as rather large, it represented less than 0.023 percent of the world's scientists. On the scientific front of the much ballyhooed "Evolution Wars", the Darwinists were winning handily. The ideological struggle between (methodological) naturalism and supernaturalism continued largely in the fantasies of the faithful and the hyperbole of the press.

=== Expertise relevance ===
The listed affiliations and areas of expertise of the signatories have also been criticized, with many signatories coming from wholly unrelated fields of academia, such as aviation and engineering, computer science and meteorology.

In addition, the list was signed by only about 0.01% of scientists in the relevant fields. According to the National Science Foundation, there were approximately 955,300 biological scientists in the United States in 1999. Only about 1/4 of the approximately 700 Darwin Dissenters in 2007 are biologists, according to Kenneth Chang of The New York Times. Approximately 40% of the Darwin Dissenters are not identified as residing in the United States, so in 2007, there were about 105 US biologists among the Darwin Dissenters, representing about 0.01% of the total number of US biologists that existed in 1999. The theory of evolution is overwhelmingly accepted throughout the scientific community. Professor Brian Alters of McGill University, an expert in the creation–evolution controversy, is quoted in an article published by the NIH as stating that "99.9 percent of scientists accept evolution".

The list has been criticized by many organizations and publications for lacking any true experts in the relevant fields of research, primarily biology. Critics have noted that of the 105 "scientists" listed on the original 2001 petition, fewer than 20% were biologists, with few of the remainder having the necessary expertise to contribute meaningfully to a discussion of the role of natural selection in evolution.

=== Other criticisms ===
Critics have also noted that the wording and advertising of the original statement was, and remains, misleading, and that a review of the signatories suggested many doubt evolution due to religious, rather than scientific beliefs. Philosopher Robert Pennock notes that rather than being a "broad dissent", the statement's wording is "very narrow, omitting any mention of the evolutionary thesis of common descent, human evolution or any of the elements of evolutionary theory except for the Darwinian mechanism, and even that was mentioned in a very limited and rather vague manner." He concludes that it is not in fact a "radical statement".

The claims made for the importance of the list have also been called intellectually dishonest because it represents only a small fraction of the scientific community, and includes an even smaller number of relevant experts. The Discovery Institute has responded to some of these criticisms.

=== Affiliations and credentials ===
Barbara Forrest and Glenn Branch say the Discovery Institute deliberately misrepresents the institutional affiliations of signatories of the statement "A Scientific Dissent from Darwinism". The institutions appearing in the list are the result of a conscious choice by the Discovery Institute to only present the most prestigious affiliations available for an individual. For example, if someone was trained at a more prestigious institution than the one they are presently affiliated with, the school they graduated from will more often be listed, without the distinction being made clear in the list. This is contrary to standard academic and professional practice.

For example, the institutions listed for Raymond G. Bohlin, Fazale Rana, and Jonathan Wells, were the University of Texas at Dallas, Ohio University, and the University of California, Berkeley respectively, the schools from which they obtained their PhD degrees. However, their present affiliations are quite different: Probe Ministries for Bohlin, the Reasons to Believe Ministry for Rana, and the Discovery Institute's Center for Science and Culture for Wells. Many of those who have signed the list are not currently active scientists, and some have never worked as scientists. Also, if a signatory was previously the head of a department or the president of an institute, their past and most prestigious position will be listed, not their current position.

Visitors at prestigious institutions will have that affiliation listed, not their more humble home institutions. For example, Bernard d'Abrera, a writer and publisher of books on butterflies, appears on the list as "Visiting Scholar, Department of Entomology British Museum (Natural History)", in spite of the fact that this museum had become independent of the British Museum three decades previously and had formally changed its name to the Natural History Museum almost a decade before the petition. d'Abrera's primary affiliation is with his publishing company, Hill House Publishers. d'Abrera does not have a PhD either, nor any formal scientific qualification (his undergraduate degree was a double major in History & Philosophy of Science, and History), although creationists have called him "Dr. d'Abrera". The Discovery Institute currently recruits people with PhDs to sign the Dissent petition.

Also, in early editions of the list, Richard Sternberg was described as "Richard Sternberg, Invertebrate Zoology, National Museum of Natural History, Smithsonian Institution" though Sternberg was never a Smithsonian staff member, but an unpaid research associate. At the time of signing the list Sternberg was the outgoing editor of the Proceedings of the Biological Society of Washington, a minor biology journal, where he played a central role in a peer-review controversy. Later versions of the list mention Sternberg's affiliation with Sternberg's alma maters, Florida International University and Binghamton University. At present Sternberg is a staff scientist with GenBank, the genetic database at the National Institutes of Health.

Critics also say the Discovery Institute inflates the academic credentials and affiliations of signatories such as Henry F. Schaefer. The institute prominently and frequently asserts that Schaefer has been nominated for the Nobel Prize in Chemistry. Barbara Forrest and others allege that the Discovery Institute is inflating his reputation by constantly referring to him as a "five-time nominee for the Nobel Prize" despite that Nobel Prize nominations remain confidential for fifty years and there being about 250–300 nominations per prize per year.

By analysing the data for 34 British, or British-trained signatories of the Dissent list, the anti-creationist British Centre for Science Education raised doubts about the claimed affiliations and relevant expertise of those on the list.

=== Defections and disagreements ===
The National Center for Science Education interviewed a sample of the signatories, and found that some were less critical of "Darwinism" than the advertisement claimed. It wrote to all of them asking whether they thought living things shared common ancestors and whether humans and apes shared common ancestors. According to Eugenie Scott of the NCSE, a few of the signatories replied saying that they did accept these principles but did not think that natural selection could explain the origins of life. However, the replies ceased when, according to Scott, the Discovery Institute found out and advised signatories not to respond. She concluded from this that "at least some of the more knowledgeable scientists did not interpret this statement the way that it was intended [by the Discovery Institute] to be interpreted by the general public."

For example, signatory Stanley N. Salthe, a visiting scientist at Binghamton University, State University of New York, who describes himself as an atheist, said that when he endorsed a petition he had no idea what the Discovery Institute was. Salthe stated, "I signed it in irritation", and said that evolutionary biologists were being unfair in suppressing competing ideas. He said that "They deserve to be prodded, as it were. It was my way of thumbing my nose at them", but was unconvinced by intelligent design and concluded "From my point of view, it's a plague on both your houses".

At least one signatory of "A Scientific Dissent From Darwinism" has abandoned the list, saying he felt misled. Robert C. Davidson, a Christian, scientist, doctor, and retired professor at the University of Washington medical school said after having signed he was shocked when he discovered that the Discovery Institute was calling evolution a "theory in crisis". "It's laughable: There have been millions of experiments over more than a century that support evolution," said Davidson. "There's always questions being asked about parts of the theory, as there are with any theory, but there's no real scientific controversy about it. ... When I joined I didn't think they were about bashing evolution. It's pseudo-science, at best. ... What they're doing is instigating a conflict between science and religion."

== Counter-petitions ==
Responding in the form of a parody, the National Center for Science Education launched Project Steve, a list of scientists named "Steve", or its equivalent (such as "Stephanie" or "Esteban"), who had signed a pro-evolution statement. As of 17 March 2017, the Steve-o-meter registered 1,412 Steves. A Discovery Institute spokesperson responded that "if Project Steve was meant to show that a considerable majority of the scientific community accepts a naturalistic conception of evolution, then the National Center for Science Education (NCSE) could have saved its energies – that fact was never in question. The more interesting question was whether any serious scientists reject a naturalistic conception of evolution".

After the Discovery Institute presented the petition as part of an amicus curiae brief in the Kitzmiller v. Dover intelligent design court case in October 2005, a counter-petition, A Scientific Support For Darwinism, was organized and gathered 7,733 signatures from scientists in four days.

As of 6 July 2015, the Clergy Letter Project has collected signatures of 13,008 American Christian clergy who "believe that the timeless truths of the Bible and the discoveries of modern science may comfortably coexist." Over 500 Jewish clergy have signed a similar "Rabbi Letter". The Clergy Letter Project has also circulated an "Imam Letter" affirming that "the timeless truths of the Qur'an may comfortably coexist with the discoveries of modern science."

== See also ==
- Creation–evolution controversy
- Level of support for evolution
- Teach the Controversy
- Wedge strategy
