= Salvo (magazine) =

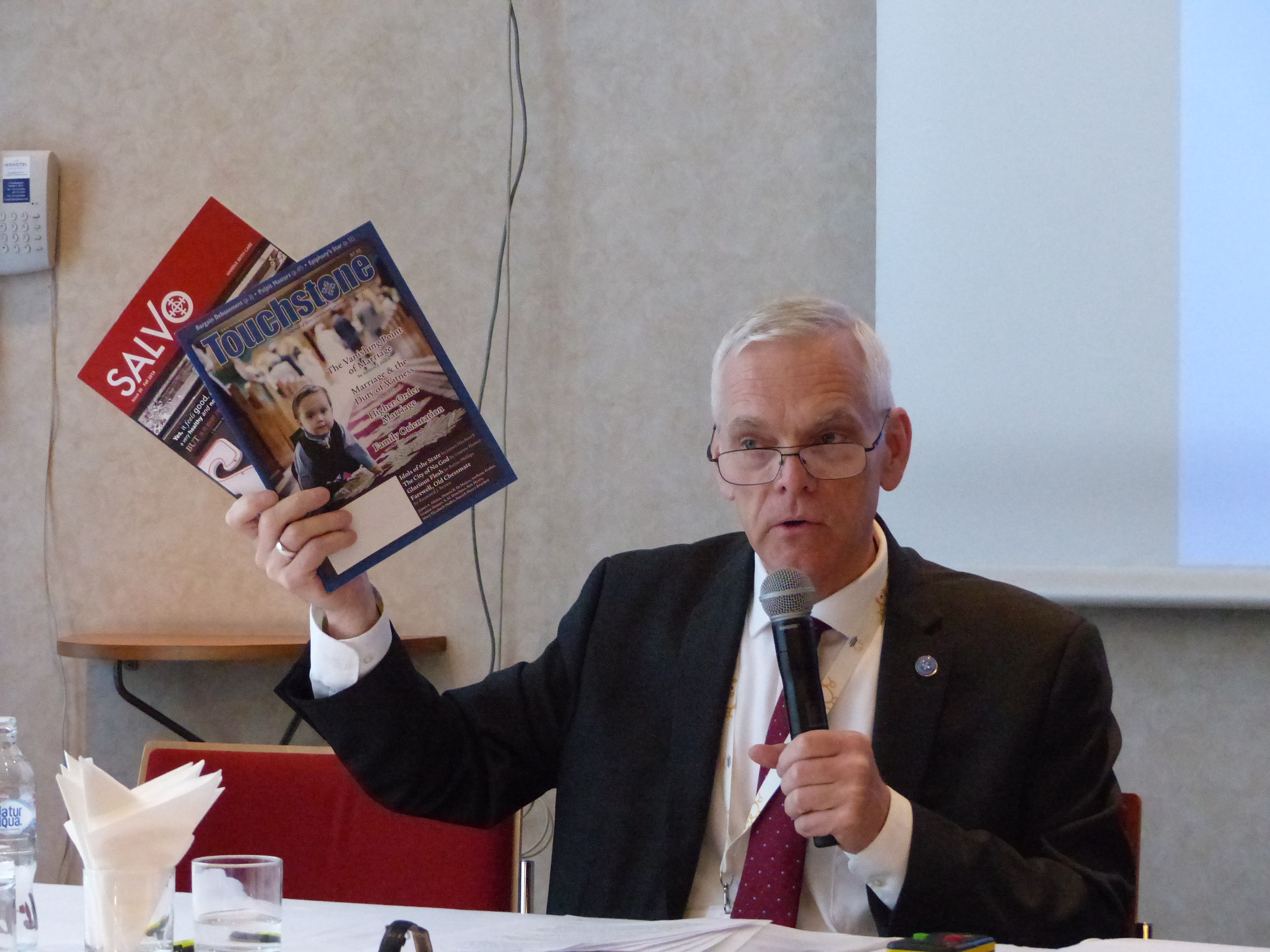
James Kushiner showing a Touchstone edition at the World Congress of Families in 2017.

Salvo is a Christian magazine published by the Fellowship of St. James (FSJ). The magazine is based in Chicago, Illinois, USA.

== History and profile ==
Salvo was founded in 2006. The magazine is published on a quarterly basis. It critiques media including books and other media, and also contains other articles. The magazine itself writes most of the publication's articles on Christian issues from a Christian viewpoint; for example, homosexuality. It is located in Chicago, Illinois.
