= Mario Beauregard =

Canadian cognitive neuroscientist

Mario Beauregard (born 1962) is a Canadian cognitive neuroscientist who is affiliated with the University of Arizona's psychology department. He is known for arguing that matter is not all that exists, writing that "Along with an increasing number of scientists, I believe vehemently that the materialist framework is not science." For this reason, he contends that the mind and the brain are fundamentally separate entities.

== Education and career ==
Beauregard received his undergraduate and doctoral degrees from the University of Montreal in Canada. He later did postdoctoral research at the University of Texas and McGill University's Montreal Neurological Institute.

== Work ==
While working at the University of Montreal, Beauregard and his graduate student, Vincent Paquette, conducted a study using fMRI to examine the brains of nuns reliving mystical experiences. They found that there was no single spot involved in mediating these experiences, but that instead, multiple brain regions and systems were involved. He has also studied the brain activity of people who are reliving near-death experiences they have previously had. He has said that this research seems to indicate that these experiences have "triggered something at a neural level in the brain."

He has also written multiple books, including The Spiritual Brain: A Neuroscientist’s Case for the Existence of the Soul, which he co-authored with Denyse O'Leary and was published in 2007. He also published another book, Brain Wars: The Scientific Battle Over the Existence of the Mind and the Proof That Will Change the Way We Live Our Lives, in 2012. In this book, he contends that the mind and brain are fundamentally distinct from one another. Among the lines of evidence he cites to support this view are the effects that one's thoughts and beliefs can have on the course of diseases like cancer and Parkinson's disease.
