= Deborah Caldwell-Stone =

American lawyer

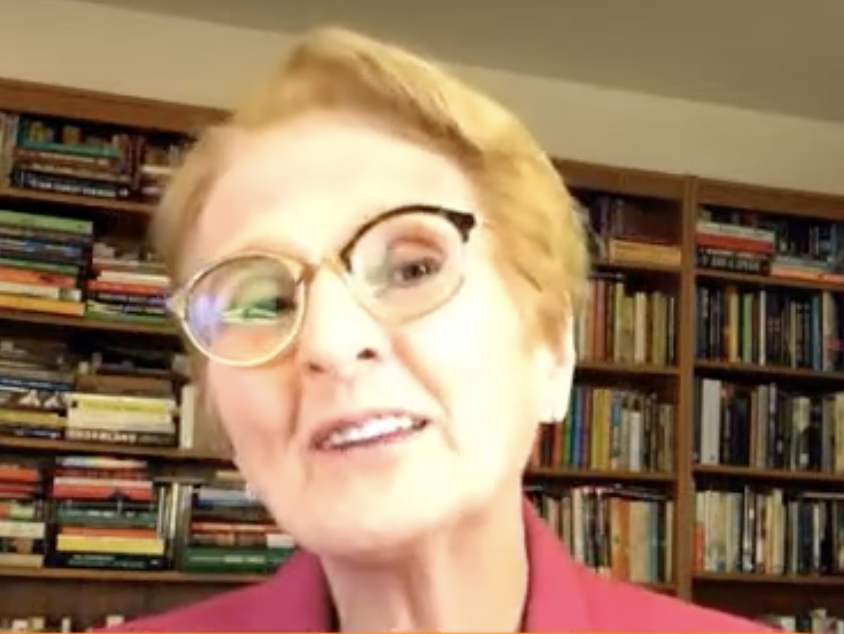
- Deborah Caldwell-Stone
- Education: Cleveland State University, Chicago-Kent College of Law
- Organization: American Library Association

Deborah Caldwell-Stone was the Director of the American Library Association's Office for Intellectual Freedom. She worked on projects "addressing censorship and privacy in the library".

== Education ==
Caldwell-Stone received a B.A. in Mass Media Communications from Cleveland State University in 1982. In 1996, she received a J.D. from Chicago-Kent College of Law at Illinois Institute of Technology.

== Career ==
She began as an attorney with Cassiday, Schade & Gloor and then worked in the Ameritech legal department.

Caldwell-Stone joined the ALA's Office for Intellectual Freedom in June 2000. In 2009, she became the Acting, and then Deputy Director of the Office for Intellectual Freedom and the Freedom to Read Foundation.

=== Advocacy ===
Caldwell-Stone has extensively discussed and written a number of articles on the Children's Internet Protection Act.

In 2014, she participated in the National Coalition Against Censorship's 404 Day, a day meant "to bring attention to the long-standing problem of Internet censorship in public libraries and schools".
