= Larry Caldwell =

Larry Caldwell, a pro-intelligent design activist and attorney, has been active in bringing litigation in causes supporting the intelligent design movement. Caldwell along with his wife, Jeanne Caldwell a Christian school teacher who "takes the Bible literally" previously operated Quality Science Education for All (but that corporation has had its status suspended), and are currently appealing to the Supreme Court of the United States an Establishment Clause of the First Amendment suit against the University of California, Berkeley.

Though much smaller in scale than the intelligent design movement's other notable legal supporter, the Thomas More Law Center, the Caldwells had in 2005 brought three separate lawsuits in support of the intelligent design movement. Timothy Sandefur, a lawyer with a public interest legal organization and ID critic, writing on the Panda's Thumb described Caldwell as known for "his hair-trigger willingness to sue people for just about anything, in the cause of ID creationism." Caldwell's friends, on the other hand, describe him as "measured, methodical and principled".

== Goals ==
Caldwell describes his goals as challenging evolution as currently taught in public schools using what he calls the Quality Science Education method, which would, in his words, teach "some of the scientific weaknesses of evolution," to teach about evolution in a manner he views as covering it "objectively, not dogmatically." The phrase "scientific weaknesses of evolution" was described by National Center for Science Education (NCSE) director Eugenie Scott as part of a progression of anti-evolution attempts to eliminate or minimise the teaching of evolution:

When textbooks include evolution, antievolutionists are motivated to modify them to either delete or water down evolution (as happened during the post-Scopes era), or "balance" it with "alternatives to evolution" (including creationism) or, most recently, to present evolution and the "scientific weaknesses of evolution."

This phrase has been used by the Discovery Institute in their intelligent design campaigns and was used in the late 1980s by Paul Ellwanger, drafter of the unconstitutional creationist "balanced treatment" laws in Arkansas and Louisiana.

== Legal action ==
=== National Center for Science Education/Eugenie Scott suit ===
In the spring of 2005 he sued the National Center for Science Education (NCSE), and its director, Eugenie Scott, alleging that Scott and the center made false claims in an article she published in California Wild, the magazine of the California Academy of Sciences.

The suit claimed that Scott misstated that Larry Caldwell had proposed the names of two creationist books to his local school board and that Scott incorrectly stated the date of the Georgia evolution disclaimers and misspelled a party's last name. The suit was abandoned by Caldwell. According to Scott, she was never served with papers for the suit. This event was seized upon by the organization driving the intelligent design movement, the Discovery Institute, to discredit their opponents, the NCSE and Scott.

=== Roseville Joint Union High School District suit ===
In October 2005 Caldwell filed suit in California federal court claiming that he was unconstitutionally denied access to various forums to promote his "Quality Science Education" proposals. In Caldwell v. Roseville Joint Union High School District Caldwell alleged free speech, establishment clause, due process and equal protection violations because his proposals were not placed on the School Board's agenda, his complaints about the school district's biology textbook were rejected, and his proposals were not placed on the agenda of the Curriculum Instruction Team in his children's high school. In September 2007 the California federal district court dismissed Caldwell's suit. In granting summary judgment to the school district, the court emphasized that "this case is not about whether a theory of intelligent design can or should be included in the science curriculum.... Rather, this case is about whether Larry Caldwell was denied access to speak in various fora or participate in certain processes because of his actual or perceived religious beliefs." Caldwell used in his proposed syllabus written material from the Discovery Institute's Cornelius Hunter and a video entitled Icons of Evolution based on Jonathan Wells' book by the same name, also from the institute.

=== University of California Berkeley suit ===
In October 2005 Larry Caldwell filed suit on behalf of his wife in federal court against the University of California, Berkeley, claiming their website 'Understanding Evolution' violated separation of church and state by linking to sites which claim that religious faith is compatible with evolution. In March, 2006 the court granted the school's motion to dismiss the suit on the basis that the plaintiffs failed to establish that they suffered any restriction of their freedom of speech or religion and that Caldwell's exposure to the Web page was too minimal to cause the type of injury that would make her eligible to sue. The Caldwells appealed and the appeal court threw the case out based on her eligibility and did not rule on whether the Web page violates the First Amendment. The Caldwells appealed to the Supreme Court of the United States which refused to hear the case.
