= Discovery Institute intelligent design campaigns =

Campaigns which seek to promote intelligent design creationism

The Discovery Institute has conducted a series of related public relations campaigns which seek to promote intelligent design while attempting to discredit evolutionary biology, which the Institute terms "Darwinism". The Discovery Institute promotes the pseudoscientific intelligent design movement and is represented by Creative Response Concepts, a public relations firm.

Prominent Institute campaigns have been to 'Teach the Controversy' and to allow 'Critical Analysis of Evolution'. Other campaigns have claimed that intelligent design advocates (most notably Richard Sternberg) have been discriminated against, and thus that Academic Freedom bills are needed to protect academics' and teachers' ability to criticise evolution, and that the development of evolutionary theory was historically linked to ideologies such as Nazism and eugenics, claims based on misrepresentation which have been ridiculed by topic experts. These three claims are all publicized in the pro-ID movie Expelled: No Intelligence Allowed; the Anti-Defamation League said the film's attempt to blame science for the Nazi Holocaust was outrageous. Other campaigns have included petitions, most notably A Scientific Dissent From Darwinism.

The theory of evolution is accepted by overwhelming scientific consensus. Intelligent design has been rejected, both by the vast majority of scientists and by court findings, such as Kitzmiller v. Dover, as being a religious view and not science.

== Goal of the campaigns ==
The overarching goal of the Institute in conducting the intelligent design campaigns is religious; to replace science with "a science consonant with Christian and theistic convictions." To accomplish this the Institute has conducted a number of public relations campaigns. The governing strategy of these various campaigns is called the Wedge strategy and was first made public when the Institute's "Wedge Document" was leaked on the World Wide Web in 1999. The Discovery Institute argues that science, due to its reliance on naturalism, is an inherently materialistic and atheistic enterprise and thus the source of many of society's ills, and that "Design theory [intelligent design] promises to reverse the stifling dominance of the materialist worldview."

None of the campaigns are aimed at directly influencing the scientific community, which the Institute considers dogmatic and hidebound, but rather are focused on swaying the opinions of the public and public policy makers, which, if effective, it is hoped will respond by forcing the academic institutions supporting the scientific community to accept the Discovery Institute's redefinition of science. Public high school science curricula has been the most common and visible target of the campaigns, with the Institute publishing its own model lesson plan, the Critical Analysis of Evolution.

In a Seattle Weekly article, Nina Shapiro quoted Institute founder and president Bruce Chapman when she wrote that behind all Discovery Institute programs there is an underlying hidden religious agenda:

Yet the Discovery Institute as an organization did not get involved in the issue in order to solve the mysteries of the universe. Chapman is up front about having a social and political agenda. He sees design intelligence as a way to combat the growing reliance on genetic explanations for human behavior and what he sees as an undermining of personal responsibility. As an example of this phenomenon, Chapman cites the infamous "Twinkie defense" used by a murder defendant claiming his sugar high made him do it.

Others associated with the institute take a bigger leap of logic to argue that welfare, as currently dispensed, is a misguided consequence of the Darwinian outlook. "If you see human beings as nothing but matter and motion, than all you do is treat them like mouths to feed," says Jay Richards, program director for the institute's Center for Science and Culture. "If they're more than that, you treat the whole person," he argues, which would mean looking at such things as family structure and the role of moral and religious values in their lives.

Do you really have to attack a whole branch of science in order to counter liberal views on welfare? The Discovery Institute folk think they do. "Unless you get the science right," Chapman says, "it's very hard to contend with the other arguments."

— Nina Shapiro, The New Creationists

The Institute's approach has been to position itself as opposed to any required teaching intelligent design, while campaigns such as Teach the Controversy and Critical Analysis of Evolution introduce high school students to design arguments through the Discovery Institute-drafted lesson plans. Teach the Controversy and Free Speech on Evolution both require that "competing" or "alternative" "theories" to evolution to be presented while the Critical Analysis of Evolution model lesson plan fills that requirement by listing intelligent design books by Institute Fellows as such alternatives for students.

"Discovery Institute opposes mandating the teaching of intelligent design, but it supports requiring students to know about scientific criticisms of Darwin's theory, which is the approach adopted by the science standards in Ohio, Minnesota, New Mexico, and currently under discussion in Kansas. Discovery Institute also supports the right of teachers to voluntarily discuss the scientific debate over intelligent design free from persecution or intimidation."

== "Teach the controversy" campaign ==
Previously, attempts to introduce creationism into public high school science curricula had been derailed when this was found to have violated the Establishment Clause of the First Amendment to the United States Constitution. In an attempt to avoid repeating this violation, the Institute today avoids directly advocating for intelligent design in high school curricula. Instead, it advocates teaching methods that introduce intelligent design ideas (and textbooks) indirectly through a campaign to "Teach the Controversy" by portraying evolution as "a theory in crisis" and "presenting all the evidence, both for and against, evolution" and teaching "Critical Analysis of Evolution" (the name of the Institute's model lesson plans on the subject). The Discovery Institute describes their approach as:

As a general approach, Discovery Institute favors teaching students more about evolution, not less. We think students deserve to know not only about the strengths of modern evolutionary theory, but also about some of the theory's weaknesses and unresolved issues. In other words, students should be taught that evolutionary theory, like any scientific theory, continues to be open to analysis and critical scrutiny. According to opinion polls, this approach is favored by the overwhelming majority of the American public, and it has also been endorsed by the U.S. Congress in report language attached to the No Child Left Behind Act Conference Report.

Gordy Slack of Salon interpreted this tactic as: "the 'more' they want to teach, of course, is what they see as evolution's shortcomings, leaving an ecological niche that will then be filled by intelligent design."

In 2001 Robert T. Pennock wrote that intelligent design proponents are "manufacturing dissent" in order to explain the absence of scientific debate of their claims: "The 'scientific' claims of such neo-creationists as Johnson, Denton, and Behe rely, in part, on the notion that these issues [surrounding evolution] are the subject of suppressed debate among biologists. ... according to neo-creationists, the apparent absence of this discussion and the nearly universal rejection of neo-creationist claims must be due to the conspiracy among professional biologists instead of a lack of scientific merit."

These teaching methods were promoted by the Institute at the Kansas evolution hearings in 2005, but were the subject of judicial criticism later in that year in the decision in Kitzmiller v. Dover Area School District: "ID's backers have sought to avoid the scientific scrutiny which we have now determined that it cannot withstand by advocating that the controversy, but not ID itself, should be taught in science class. This tactic is at best disingenuous, and at worst a canard. The goal of the IDM is not to encourage critical thought, but to foment a revolution which would supplant evolutionary theory with ID." The slogan "teach the controversy" has been increasingly superseded by the more oblique "Critical Analysis of Evolution".

== Campaigns claiming discrimination ==
The claim that "scientists, teachers, and students are under attack for questioning evolution" and have been discriminated against, is the centerpiece of a number of campaigns conducted by the Institute. Notable among these campaigns is the Sternberg peer review controversy and in the more recent case of Guillermo Gonzalez's denial of tenure. As part of a long term strategy the Institute actively promotes an image of intelligent design proponents suffering professional setbacks or failing to advance as victims of "Darwinist inquisitions" conducted by "Thought Police". Critics of intelligent design and the Institute such as PZ Myers, Eugenie Scott and Barbara Forrest frequently find themselves the subjects of unflattering articles on the Institute's blog which ignores or downplays the responses of large scientific and academic organizations rejecting intelligent design while portraying opponents as members of an academic and scientific fringe and minority. Other methods employed by the Institute include what they term "Public Education"; described as exposing 'bigotry and intolerance' to 'public disapproval' often through the Institute's blog Evolutionnews.org, "Personal Assistance"; described as "providing assistance in locating free legal representation from a network of concerned lawyers across the nation" and "investigations" and lobbying of officials by the Institute, "Legal Defense" and "Grassroots Action".

Other purported instances of discrimination publicised by the Discovery Institute include:

- philosopher Francis J. Beckwith's initial failure to gain tenure from Baylor University;
- biology teacher Roger DeHart's reassignment at, and later resignation from, Burlington-Edison High School for teaching intelligent design;
- Mississippi University for Women chemist Nancy Bryson, who was removed as head of the science and mathematics division, purportedly for giving a presentation entitled "Critical Thinking on Evolution", which claimed evidence for intelligent design in nature. After protests, the university decided Bryson could keep the job and insisted her removal had nothing to do with the lecture.
- biologist Caroline Crocker, who was barred by George Mason University from teaching a Cell Biology class over her introduction of intelligent design into it, and whose contract at that university was not renewed;
- The closure of the short-lived Evolutionary Informatics Lab formed by Baylor University engineering professor Robert J. Marks II, which included Southwestern Baptist Theological Seminary research professor in philosophy William Dembski as a postdoctoral researcher. The lab was shut down and its website was deleted because Baylor's administration considered that it violated university policy forbidding professors from creating the impression that their personal views represent Baylor as an institution. Baylor however permitted Marks to resume work in the informatics lab on his own time and maintain his website, provided a disclaimer accompany any intelligent design-advancing research makes clear that the work does not represent the university's position.

Court cases (such as Webster v. New Lenox School District and Bishop v. Aronov) have upheld school districts' and universities' right to restrict teaching to a specified curriculum. None of these purported cases of discrimination have been subjected to formal legal or congressional scrutiny.

In August 2007, an upcoming movie publicising a number of these incidents was announced, entitled Expelled: No Intelligence Allowed and starring Ben Stein.

=== Free Speech on Evolution campaign ===
The primary message of the campaign was:

"Across America, the freedom of scientists, teachers, and students to question Darwin is coming under increasing attack by what can only be called Darwinian fundamentalists. These self-appointed defenders of the theory of evolution are waging a malicious campaign to demonize and blacklist anyone who disagrees with them."

The term gained exposure when the Institute was widely quoted in the press in 2005 after president Bush publicly spoke in favor of teaching intelligent design alongside evolution as a competing theory and Institute fellow John G. West responded with a statement framing the issue as a matter of free speech: "President Bush is to be commended for defending free speech on evolution, and supporting the right of students to hear about different scientific views about evolution."

A notable characteristic of this campaign is the Institute's framing of the issues as a confluence of free speech, academic freedom and discrimination.

The campaign has found traction with the Discovery Institute's constituency, conservative Christians, but has failed to produce gains with a wider audience. Critics of the Institute and intelligent design have alleged that the campaign is founded on intellectual dishonesty. PZ Myers describes the "free speech on evolution campaign" as promoting intolerance, lies and distortions, while Wesley R. Elsberry says 'Free Speech on Evolution' is a "catchphrase" describing false compromises offered by Institute Fellows that introduce intelligent design into science classes indirectly by having teachers "teach the controversy."

=== Campaigns portraying books and sites as banned ===
Banned Books Week is an awareness campaign, led annually by the American Library Association, in an attempt to protect freedom of speech by celebrating books that the ALA claims others have banned or attempted to ban from various venues. In 2006, Discovery Institute Fellow John West nominated the book Of Pandas and People, on the basis of it being "at the heart of" Kitzmiller v. Dover Area School District. However the decision in Kitzmiller made no order regarding Pandas, rendering the basis for considering it to be "banned" highly tenuous, and the assertion was dismissed by Deborah Caldwell-Stone, Deputy Director of the American Library Association's Office for Intellectual Freedom who does not consider the book banned. The Discovery Institute continued to misrepresent the book as banned in 2007, with the statement that:

In 2005, a federal judge banned Pandas outright from science classrooms in Dover, Pennsylvania

— Casey Luskin, Evolution News & Views, Discovery Institute

In 2007, the Discovery Institute nominated Robert J. Marks' 'Evolutionary Informatics Lab' web-site as "Banned Item of the Year", after it was deleted from the Baylor University server. However, the site is still accessible, now being hosted on a third party server.

=== Academic freedom campaign ===
Between 2004 and 2008 a number of anti-evolution 'Academic Freedom' bills were introduced in State legislatures in Alabama, Oklahoma, Maryland, Florida, Louisiana, Missouri and Michigan, based largely upon language drafted by the Discovery Institute. As of May 2008, none of them were successfully passed into law.

They purport that teachers, students, and college professors face intimidation and retaliation when discussing scientific criticisms of evolution, and therefore require protection. Critics of the bills point out that there are no credible scientific critiques of evolution. Investigation of the allegations of intimidation and retaliation have found no evidence that it occurs.

In February 2008, the Discovery Institute announced the Academic Freedom Petition campaign, which it is conducting with assistance from Brian Gage Design who provides the Discovery Institute graphic design professional services. The petition states:

We, the undersigned American citizens, urge the adoption of policies by our nation's academic institutions to ensure teacher and student academic freedom to discuss the scientific strengths and weaknesses of Darwinian evolution. Teachers should be protected from being fired, harassed, intimidated, or discriminated against for objectively presenting the scientific strengths and weaknesses of Darwinian theory. Students should be protected from being harassed, intimidated, or discriminated against for expressing their views about the scientific strengths and weaknesses of Darwinian theory in an appropriate manner.

Casey Luskin, program officer for public policy and legal affairs at Discovery Institute, is the contact person for the campaign's Model Academic Freedom Statute on Evolution.

== Campaigns to link evolution to Nazism and eugenics ==
In his 2004 book From Darwin to Hitler, Evolutionary Ethics, Eugenics and Racism in Germany, Discovery Institute fellow Richard Weikart links Charles Darwin's Theory of Evolution to Nazism, concluding:

Darwinism by itself did not produce the Holocaust, but without Darwinism, especially in its social Darwinist and eugenics permutations, neither Hitler nor his Nazi followers would have had the necessary scientific underpinnings to convince themselves and their collaborators that one of the world's greatest atrocities was really morally praiseworthy. Darwinism – or at least some naturalistic interpretation of Darwinism – succeeded in turning morality on its head.

This conclusion is however controversial, with professor of history at the University of Louisville Ann Taylor Allen giving the opinion that Weikart's talk about "Darwinism" is not based on any careful reading of Darwin himself but on vague ideas by a variety of people who presented themselves as "Darwinian." Moreover, fundamental elements of Nazism like anti-Semitism cannot be attributed to Darwinism since it predates evolutionary theory. Allen concluded:

This picture of the Holocaust as the outcome of a 'culture war' between religion and science leads to serious distortions on both sides. The 'Judeo-Christian' worldview is unproblematically associated here with many beliefs – such as opposition to birth control, legalized abortion, and assisted suicide--that many believing Christians and Jews would reject. And 'Darwinism' is equated with a hodgepodge of ideas about race, politics, and social issues. If all these ideas were to fall into well-deserved obsolescence, this would in no way detract from the validity of Darwin's contributions to modern biological science. Neither religion nor science is well served by this oversimplified view of their complex history.

Discovery Institute Center for Science and Culture Associate Director John G. West, in both his book Darwin Day in America and in lectures, has attempted to link Darwin to the eugenics movement. However, critics point out that:

- this movement came to prominence during the 'eclipse' of Darwinian evolution in the early 20th century;
- the popular support for eugenics was matched with popular opposition to teaching evolution;
- "while many biologists did support eugenic policies, many important biologists did not";
- it was evolutionary biology that provided information debunking eugenics;
- West quoted Darwin out of context in order to misrepresent him as supporting eugenics; and
- prominent evolutionary biologists, such as Stephen Jay Gould have spoken out against eugenics.
- "on the whole the evangelical mainstream [...] appeared apathetic, acquiescent, or at times downright supportive of the eugenics movement" between 1900 and 1940.

== Campaign to discredit the Kitzmiller v. Dover Area School District decision ==
=== For deciding whether intelligent design is science ===
David K. DeWolf, John G. West and Casey Luskin, senior fellows or officers of the Discovery Institute, argued that intelligent design is a valid scientific theory, that the Jones court should not have addressed the question of whether it was a scientific theory, and that the decision will have no effect on the development and adoption of intelligent design as an alternative to standard evolutionary theory. Peter Irons responded to the DeWolf et al. article, arguing that the decision was extremely well reasoned, and that it marks the end to legal efforts by the intelligent design movement to introduce creationism in public schools. DeWolf et al. responded to the Irons article in the same issue.

=== "Study" criticizing Judge Jones ===
The Discovery Institute and its fellows published several articles describing a "study" performed by the Discovery Institute criticizing the judge in the Kitzmiller v. Dover Area School District trial. It claims that "90.9% of Judge Jones' [opinion] on intelligent design as science was taken virtually verbatim from the ACLU's proposed 'Findings of Fact and Conclusions of Law' submitted to Judge Jones nearly a month before his ruling." The study, though making no specific allegations of wrongdoing, implies that Judge Jones relied upon the plaintiff's submissions in writing his own conclusions of law.

Within a day, the president of the York County Bar Association wrote that parties are required by the courts to submit findings of fact and "a judge can adopt some, all or none of the proposed findings." She added that in the final ruling, a judge's decision "is the judge's findings and it doesn't matter who submitted them". A partner in a York law firm said that "Any attempt to make a stink out of it is absurd."

Several commentators described a number of critical flaws in the study from both a numerical and legal standpoint. Witold Walczak, legal director for the ACLU of Pennsylvania and the ACLU's lead attorney on the case called the Institute's report a stunt: "They're getting no traction in the scientific world so they're trying to do something ... as a PR stunt to get attention, ... That's not how scientists work, ... Discovery Institute is trying to litigate a year-old case in the media." He also said the Discovery Institute staff is not, as it claims, interested in finding scientific truths; it is more interested in a "cultural war," pushing for intelligent design and publicly criticizing a judge.

A subsequent review of the study performed by Wesley Elsberry, author of the text comparison program that was partly responsible for the decision in the case, indicated that only 38% of the complete ruling by Judge Jones actually incorporated the findings of fact and conclusions of law that the plaintiffs proposed that he incorporate, and only 66% of the section (on whether intelligent design was science) incorporated the proposals, not the 90.9% the Discovery Institute claimed was copied in that section. Significantly, Judge Jones adopted only 48% of the plaintiffs's proposed findings of fact for that section, and rejected 52%, clearly showing that he did not accept the section verbatim.

== "Intelligent design is not creationism" ==
One of the principal rationales behind intelligent design's neo-creationist strategy is to separate intelligent design from previous, more explicitly religious, forms of creationism, and the legal defeats that prohibit them from public school science classrooms. For this reason, the Discovery Institute (and its supporters) make frequent and vehement denials of any connection between intelligent design and creationism. These denials are at times bitter and abrasive, for example:

[John Derbyshire] still can't understand the obvious differences between creationism and intelligent design, continually conflating the two and looking like an ill-informed crank.

— Robert Crowther, Discovery Institute, Is It Really Intelligent Design that has the Great Derb Worried?, Evolution News & Views

However this assertion has been refuted both in court and academia. In Kitzmiller v. Dover Area School District Judge John E. Jones III found that "the overwhelming evidence at trial established that intelligent design is a religious view, a mere re-labeling of creationism, and not a scientific theory." Numerous books have been written by prominent academics documenting intelligent design as a form of creationism, e.g.:

- Creationism's Trojan Horse – The Wedge of Intelligent Design by Barbara Forrest and Paul R. Gross
- The Creationists, From Scientific Creationism to Intelligent Design by Ronald Numbers
- Tower of Babel: The Evidence Against the New Creationism by Robert T. Pennock

== Petition campaigns ==
The Discovery Institute has created a number of petitions to give the impression that there are widespread doubts about the Theory of Evolution among scientists and scientifically-literate professionals. These petitions include A Scientific Dissent From Darwinism, Physicians and Surgeons for Scientific Integrity, Physicians and Surgeons who Dissent from Darwinism, and the now-defunct Stand Up For Science.

=== Physicians and Surgeons who Dissent from Darwinism ===
Physicians and Surgeons who Dissent from Darwinism is a petition promoting intelligent design. It consists of a list of people agreeing with a statement casting doubt on evolution. The petition was produced by the Physicians and Surgeons for Scientific Integrity (PSSI), a nonprofit organization formed by the Discovery Institute, and is intended to support the Discovery Institute's campaign to portray intelligent design as a scientifically valid theory by creating the impression that evolution lacks broad scientific support. It is similar to the Discovery Institute intelligent design campaigns to discredit evolution.

The document itself has been the subject of controversy and extensive criticism from a variety of sources. The statement in the document has been branded as poorly worded, misleading and vague. This campaign, like the rest of the Discovery Institute anti-evolution campaigns, has come under criticism for being misleading and anti-science. The list of signatories represents an insignificant fraction of medical professionals (about 0.02%). The evidence of evolution is not determined by petitions or polls, but by scientific consensus. This is the reason that the theory of evolution is overwhelmingly accepted.

==== Statement ====
The medical doctors and comparable professionals are signatories to a statement which disputes evolution, which they refer to as "Darwinian macroevolution" or "Darwinism", which are both misleading terms. The statement that the organization subscribes to is titled "Physicians and Surgeons who Dissent from Darwinism" and contains the following text:

"We are skeptical of claims for the ability of random mutation and natural selection to account for the origination and complexity of life and we therefore dissent from Darwinian macroevolution as a viable theory. This does not imply the endorsement of any alternative theory."

Evolutionary synthesis and the theory of evolution state that random mutation leads to inherited traits that become more or less common due to non-random natural selection and random genetic drift, as well as other mechanisms. Therefore, the PSSI statement is overly vague and worded in a misleading fashion, since few real evolutionary biologists would subscribe to the version of evolution presented by the statement. Evolution does not include the study of the origin of life, as the statement implies.

The wording of this statement is very similar to the wording of the Discovery Institute's petition, "A Scientific Dissent from Darwinism", which has been widely criticized for being inaccurate and misleading.

==== History ====
The Physicians and Surgeons for Scientific Integrity was formed in 2006. By May 8, 2006, the PSSI Dissent petition had 34 signatories. There were 100 signatories on July 30, 2006. By December 2006, 167 had signed the statement. By May 22, 2007, 252 appeared on the list. As of July 30, 2007, the list included 264 names.

The PSSI invites holders of the M.D., D.O., D.D.S., D.M.D., D.V.M., or similar degrees to sign the Dissent petition.

==== Analysis ====
The statement is similar to the A Scientific Dissent from Darwinism of the Discovery Institute which has come under extensive criticism from a variety of sources as misleading, poorly phrased and containing only a tiny fraction of professionals in relevant fields.

Statement of "A Scientific Dissent from Darwinism":

We are skeptical of claims for the ability of random mutation and natural selection to account for the complexity of life. Careful examination of the evidence for Darwinian theory should be encouraged.

The value of the opinions of physicians, surgeons, veterinarians, optometrists and other signatories of this petition is not clear. Referring to the number of people on the Scientific Dissent from Darwinism list and their claimed relevance, University of Minnesota biology professor PZ Myers writes, "Not only is the number that they cite pathetically small, but they rely on getting scientists whose expertise isn't relevant." In analogy, it can be argued that the 'Physicians' list represents an insignificant fraction of the total medical profession. Addressing a specific example, Myers says of neurosurgeon Michael Egnor, who signed both lists, that "The Discovery Institute may like to trumpet his expertise in neurosurgery as an indicator of the significance of his dissent from evolutionary biology, but I think I'd rather trumpet his ignorance of evolutionary biology as an indicator of the uselessness of the Discovery Institute's list." Myers continued to state that the signer "is not only wrong, but he's pretty damn arrogant about it – how else to explain someone who is proud of the fact that he knows nothing about a subject, and is proud of his inability to find sources that would correct his ignorance, even when they're pointed out to him directly? He's like Michael Behe, in that we can plop mountains of information in front of him, and he'll just blithely claim it doesn't exist."

The compiled list of medical professionals is available on the Internet, where each signatory is listed three times: by last name, by country and by specialty. Most of the doctors who signed the statement are from the United States. As of May 22, 2007 there were 224 signatories from the United States, two signatories from Australia, four signatories from Canada, eight signatories from the United Kingdom and another 14 from nine other countries. However, this figure should be expected to rise, based on a poll of 1472 US physicians conducted by the "Louis Finkelstein Institute for Social and Religious Research" at the Jewish Theological Seminary and HCD Research in Flemington, New Jersey, from May 13–15, 2005. This study showed that 34% of physician respondents felt more comfortable with intelligent design than evolution. include doctors trained or working in a wide range of disciplines, including, addiction medicine, bariatrics (i.e., weight loss medicine), dentistry, dermatology, hospice care, ophthalmology, optometry, plastic surgery, psychiatry, radiology, urology and veterinary medicine.

The American Medical Association estimates that in 2006, there were more than 884,000 physicians in the United States. In addition, the US Bureau of Labor Statistics estimated that in May 2003 the US had 97,090 dentists, 63,780 opticians, 22,740 optometrists and 43,890 veterinarians.

Therefore, the total number of US professionals in the fields represented by the "Physicians and Surgeons for Scientific Integrity" Dissent petition is at least 1,111,500. That is, the 224 US signatories of the statement represent approximately 0.02% of the total number of US professionals in these fields.

=== Stand Up For Science ===
The Stand Up For Science campaign originated in July 2006 leading up to the showdown in the Kansas Board of Education that began with Kansas evolution hearings, which was also driven by the Discovery Institute. The Institute's online petition and Stand Up For Science website where one could sign the petition were prominent features of the campaign. During the period leading up to the Kansas evolution hearings the Institute ran a number radio and print ads across Kansas incorporating many of its slogans, such as "Teach the Controversy", "Free Speech on Evolution", and "Critical Analysis of Evolution", and directing readers and listeners to the Discovery Institute website. As the Kansas debate over the teaching of evolution wound down in Fall 2006 after the conservative Republicans who approved the Critical Analysis of Evolution classroom standards lost their majority in a primary election and the moderate Republicans and Democrats vowed to overturn Discovery Institute-influenced 2005 school science standards and adopt those recommended by a State Board Science Hearing Committee that were rejected by the previous board, the Institute shifted the focus of The Stand Up For Science campaign from Kansas to Texas.

The scientific and science education communities reacted to campaign by saying that it was a misinformation campaign. Nick Matzke described the campaign's support for science as "irony-meter-busting". In response to the campaign Kansas biology teacher Jeremy Mohn founded the competing website, Stand Up for REAL Science.

== Theistic evolution ==
On May 26, 2009, the Discovery Institute announced a new website, FaithandEvolution.Org. The site attacks theistic evolution, and New Scientist suggests that it is in response to Francis Collins' recent launch of the BioLogos Institute to promote theistic evolution.

== Criticism ==
Every leading scientific professional organization has through position statements unequivocally endorsed evolution as a widely accepted and well-proven theory. McGill University Professor of Education Brian Alters states in an article published by the NIH that "99.9 percent of scientists accept evolution".

Critics say that the Institute is conducting a deliberate disinformation campaign. One common criticism is that the rhetoric employed by the Institute in its campaigns is intentionally vague and misleading and that the campaigns mask a near total absence of scientific support and productive research programs. The Templeton Foundation, who once provided grants for conferences and courses to debate intelligent design has since rejected the Discovery Institute's entreaties for more funding, Foundation senior vice president Charles L. Harper Jr. said "They're political – that for us is problematic," and that while Discovery has "always claimed to be focused on the science," "what I see is much more focused on public policy, on public persuasion, on educational advocacy and so forth."

In one of a series of articles in Skeptic on the movie Expelled: No Intelligence Allowed, ID critic Ed Brayton noted:

The intelligent design (ID) movement has long labored to inculcate two mutually exclusive falsehoods in the minds of the public: A) that ID is a purely scientific theory that has nothing to do with religion; and B) that any objection to ID is evidence of bias and discrimination against religion.

— Ed Brayton, The Richard Sternberg Affair

== See also ==
- Intelligent design in politics
