= Evolution: A Theory in Crisis =

1985 book by Michael Denton

- Cover
- Author: Michael Denton
- Language: English
- Subject: Evolution
- Publisher: Burnett Books
- Publication date: 1985
- Media type: Print
- Pages: 368
- ISBN: 0-09-152450-4

Evolution: A Theory in Crisis is a 1985 book by Michael Denton, in which the author argues that the scientific theory of evolution by natural selection is a "theory in crisis". Reviews by scientists say that the book distorts and misrepresents evolutionary theory and contains numerous errors.

== Intelligent design ==
The Discovery Institute lists A Theory in Crisis as one of the "Peer-Reviewed & Peer-Edited Scientific Publications Supporting the Theory of Intelligent Design", though the work does not mention intelligent design.

A Theory in Crisis predates the 1987 United States Supreme Court decision in Edwards v. Aguillard which was a catalyst for the foundation of the intelligent design movement in the early 1990s. Biochemist Douglas Theobald claims that Denton's later book Nature's Destiny contradicts some of the points of A Theory in Crisis.

== Reception ==
Reviews by parties within the scientific community were vehemently negative, with several attacking flaws in Denton's arguments. Biologist and philosopher Michael Ghiselin described A Theory in Crisis as "a book by an author who is obviously incompetent, dishonest, or both – and it may be very hard to decide which is the case" and that his "arguments turn out to be flagrant instances of the fallacy of irrelevant conclusion."

Biologist Walter P. Coombs writing in Library Journal said that Denton "details legitimate questions, some as old as Darwin's theory, some as new as molecular biology, but he also distorts or misrepresents other 'problems'" and that "much of the book reads like creationist prattle, but there are also some interesting points." Mark I. Vuletic, in an essay posted to the talk.origins Archive, presented a detailed argument that Denton's attempts to make an adequate challenge to evolutionary biology fail, contending that Denton neither managed to undermine the evidence for evolution, nor demonstrated that macroevolutionary mechanisms are inherently implausible.

Philip Spieth, Professor of Genetics at University of California, Berkeley, reviewed the book saying his conclusions are "erroneous" and wrote that the book "could not pass the most sympathetic peer review" because "evolutionary theory is misrepresented and distorted; spurious arguments are advanced as disproof of topics to which the arguments are, at best, tangentially relevant; evolutionary biologists are quoted out of context; large portions of relevant scientific literature are ignored; dubious or inaccurate statements appear as bald assertions accompanied, more often than not, with scorn."

Paleontologist Niles Eldredge in a review wrote that the book is "fraught with distortions" and utilized arguments similar to creationists.

Creationists including John W. Oller, Jr of the Institute for Creation Research, and Answers in Genesis positively reviewed Denton's book. Intelligent design proponents Phillip E. Johnson and Michael J. Behe say that they rejected evolution after reading the book. Christian apologist and intelligent design advocate Thomas E. Woodward stated "Christians who are interested in the struggle of science to come to terms with the origin of the biosphere in all its variety should read this book and ponder its argumentation."

== Molecular equidistance ==
Molecular equidistance is a term that was first used by Michael Denton in Evolution: A Theory in Crisis to criticise the theory of evolution. The variation in the amino acid sequence of proteins such as cytochrome C can be analyzed to provide a phylogenetic tree that matches trees provided by other taxonomic evidence. What Denton pointed out was that if the percentage difference in cytochrome C amino acid sequences was compared from one organism to other organisms, the changes could be highly uniform. For example, the difference between the amino acid sequence for the cytochrome C of a carp and those of a frog, turtle, chicken, rabbit, and horse is a very constant 13% to 14%. Similarly, the difference between the cytochrome C of a bacterium and yeast, wheat, moth, tuna, pigeon, and horse only ranges from 64% to 69%.

Denton suggested that these data undermined the notion that fish were ancestral to frogs, which were ancestral to reptiles, which were ancestral to birds and mammals. If they were, then wouldn't the difference in cytochrome C structures be increasingly different from carp to frog, to reptile, to mammal? How could the cytochrome C amino acid sequences for such a wide range of species all be "equidistant" from the sequence for bacteria? Molecular biologists quickly pointed out the fallacy in Denton's argument. Just as there is no such thing as a "living fossil", and all modern species are cousins, so too, the amino acid sequences for all living species have been evolving since the time of their divergence from a common ancestor. A modern carp is not an ancestor to a frog; frogs are not ancestors to turtles; turtles are not ancestors to rabbits. Similarly, the variations in eukaryotic cytochrome C structure with respect to bacteria are all due to mutations taking place since divergence from the common ancestor of these different organisms. It thus is not surprising that they show a similar level of divergence and equidistance of this type was even predicted and confirmed by researchers as early as 1963.

Denton did understand this reply, but claimed that it was implausible to assume that such a molecular clock could keep such constant time over different lineages. Those familiar with molecular clocks did not agree, since calibration with fossil records shows the cytochrome clock to be surprisingly reliable, and also found his suggestion that molecular equidistance was instead evidence of some sort of evolutionary "direction" to be a more implausible assumption than the one to which he was objecting. Critics found it difficult to accept a "directed" mechanism for changes in cytochrome C that were neutral, producing different proteins whose action was the same. Denton's conclusions have been called "erroneous" and "spurious" and marine biologist Wesley R. Elsberry states that all the observations in question can be explained within the modern framework of evolutionary theory.
