= Michael Denton =

British biochemist (born 1943)

- Born: August 25, 1943 (age 83)
- Citizenship: British
- Education: University of Bristol (MD); King's College London (PhD)
- Scientific career
- Fields: Biochemistry
- Thesis: The characterisation of developing adult mammalian erythroid cells separated by velocity sedimentation (1974)

Michael John Denton (born 25 August 1943) is a British biochemist and physician. He is a proponent of intelligent design and a senior fellow at the Center for Science and Culture at the Discovery Institute. He holds a PhD degree in biochemistry. Denton's book, Evolution: A Theory in Crisis, inspired intelligent design proponents Phillip Johnson and Michael Behe.

== Biography ==
Denton earned a Doctor of Medicine from Bristol University in 1969 and his Ph.D. in biochemistry from King's College London in 1974. He was a senior research fellow in the Biochemistry Department at the University of Otago, Dunedin, New Zealand from 1990 to 2005. He later became a scientific researcher in the field of genetic eye diseases. He has spoken worldwide on genetics, evolution and the anthropic argument for design. Denton's current interests include defending the "anti-Darwinian evolutionary position" and the design hypothesis formulated in his book Nature’s Destiny. Denton described himself as an agnostic. He is currently a senior fellow at the Discovery Institute's Center for Science and Culture.

== Books ==
=== Evolution: A Theory in Crisis ===
In 1985 Denton wrote the book Evolution: A Theory in Crisis, presenting a systematic critique of neo-Darwinism ranging from paleontology, fossils, homology, molecular biology, genetics and biochemistry, and argued that evidence of design exists in nature. Some book reviews criticized his arguments. He describes himself as an evolutionist and he has rejected biblical creationism. The book influenced Phillip E. Johnson, the father of intelligent design, Michael Behe, a proponent of irreducible complexity, and George Gilder, co-founder of the Discovery Institute, the hub of the intelligent design movement. Since writing the book Denton has changed many of his views on evolution; however, he still believes that the existence of life is a matter of design.

=== Nature's Destiny ===
Denton still accepts design and embraces a non-Darwinian evolutionary theory. He denies that randomness accounts for the biology of organisms; he has proposed an evolutionary theory which is a "directed evolution" in his book Nature's Destiny (1998). Life, according to Denton, did not exist until the initial conditions of the universe were fine-tuned (see Fine-tuned universe). Denton was influenced by Lawrence Joseph Henderson (1878-1942), Paul Davies and John D. Barrow who argued for an anthropic principle in the cosmos (Denton 1998, v, Denton 2005). His second book Nature's Destiny (1998) is his biological contribution to the anthropic principle debate, dominated by physicists. He argues for a law-like evolutionary unfolding of life.

== Publications ==
- Evolution: A Theory in Crisis. Adler & Adler, 1985. ISBN 0-917561-52-X
- Nature's Destiny: How the Laws of Biology Reveal Purpose in the Universe, New York: Free Press, 1998. ISBN 0-7432-3762-5
- Evolution: Still a Theory in Crisis. Seattle, Washington: Discovery Institute, 2016. Paperback: ISBN 978-1936599325
