= Eugene K. Balon =

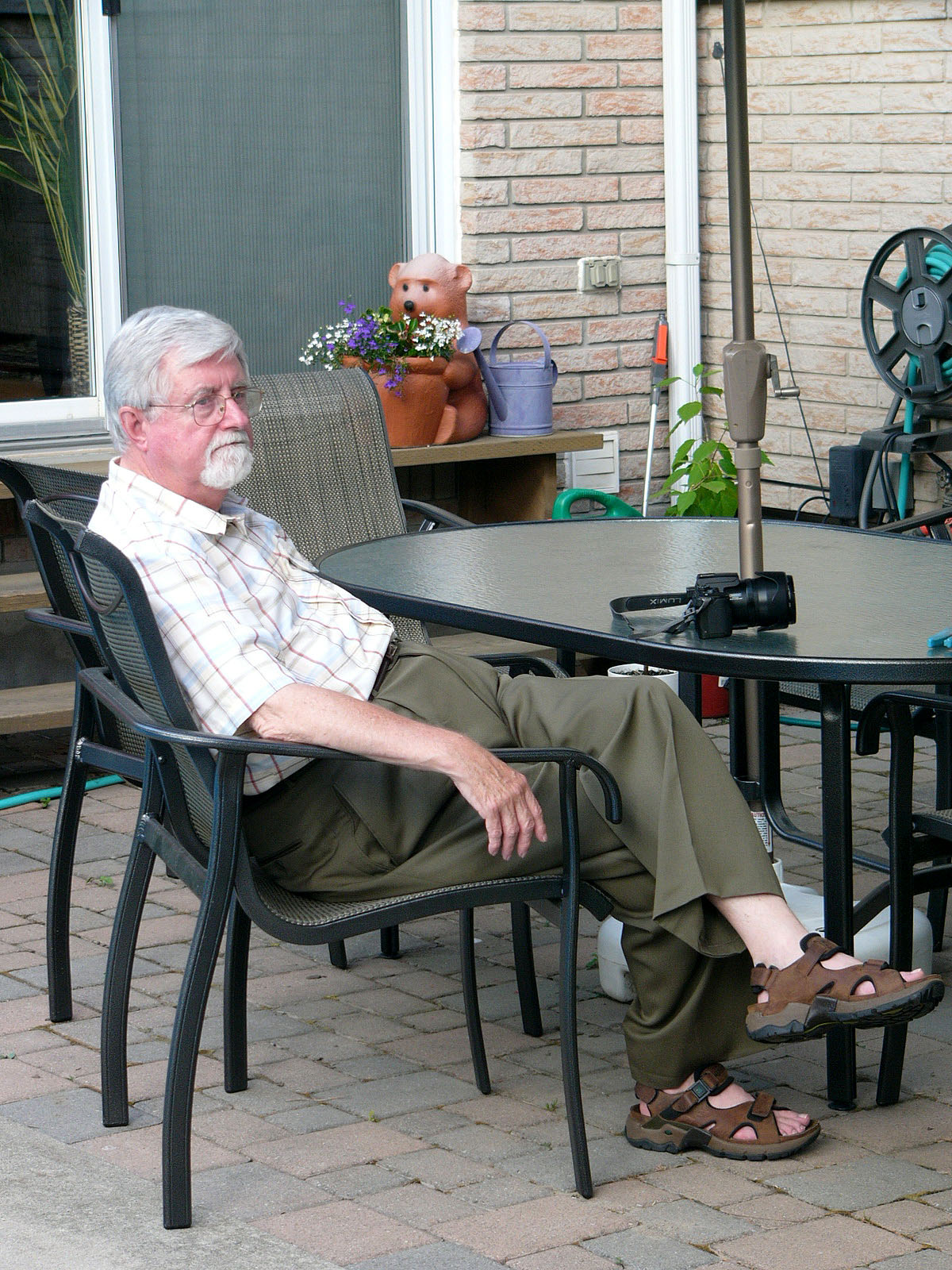
- Born: 1 August 1930; Orlová, Czechoslovakia
- Died: 4 September 2013 (aged 83); Guelph, Ontario, Canada
- Education: Charles University, Prague
- Scientific career
- Fields: Zoology, ichthyology
- Workplaces: Slovak Academy of Sciences; University of Guelph

Eugene Kornel Balon (Polish: Eugeniusz Kornel Bałon, Czech: Evžen Kornel Balon; 1 August 1930 – 4 September 2013) was a Polish Canadian and Czech zoologist and ichthyologist.

== Biography ==
Balon was born on 1 August 1930 in Orlová in Czechoslovakia. He went to the Polish High School in Orlová, where he took his A levels in 1949. From 1953 to 1967 he worked in the Slovak Academy of Sciences in Bratislava where he studied the endemic fauna of Danube. From 1967 to 1967 he was a United Nations expert in Zambia. After 1976, he was a teacher on the University of Guelph. He died on 4 September 2013 in Guelph, at the age of 83.

Two species of fishes were named after him: Balon's ruffe (Gymnocephalus baloni) and Tilapia baloni.

== Publications ==
- Balon, E. K. (1979). "The theory of saltation and its application in the ontogeny of fishes: steps and thresholds". Environmental Biology of Fishes. 4 (2): 97–101.
- ———— (2001). "Saltatory Ontogeny and the Life-History Model: Neglected Processes and Patterns of Evolution". Journal of Bioeconomics. 3 (1): 1–26.
- ———— (2002). "Epigenetic Processes, when Natura Non Facit Saltum Becomes a Myth, and Alternative Ontogenies a Mechanism of Evolution". Environmental Biology of Fishes. 65 (1): 1–35.
- ———— (2004). "Evolution by epigenesis: Farewell to Darwinism, Neo-and Otherwise". Rivista di Biologia-Biology Forum. 97: 269–312.
