= Kansas evolution hearings =

2005 Board of Education hearings in Kansas

A series of hearings were held in Topeka, Kansas, United States from May 5 to 12, 2005 by the Kansas State Board of Education and its State Board Science Hearing Committee to change how evolution and the origin of life would be taught in the state's public high school science classes. The hearings were arranged by the Board of Education with the intent of introducing intelligent design into science classes via the Teach the Controversy method.

The hearings raised the issues of creation and evolution in public education and were attended by all the major participants in the intelligent design movement but were ultimately boycotted by the scientific community over concern of lending credibility to the claim, made by proponents of intelligent design, that evolution is the subject of wide dispute within the scientific and science education communities.

The Discovery Institute, hub of the intelligent design movement, played a central role in starting the hearings by promoting its Critical Analysis of Evolution lesson plan which the Kansas State Board of Education eventually adopted over objections of the State Board Science Hearing Committee, and campaigning on behalf of conservative Republican candidates for the Board.

Local science advocacy group Kansas Citizens for Science organized a boycott of the hearings by mainstream scientists, who accused it of being a kangaroo court and argued that their participation would lend an undeserved air of legitimacy to the hearings.

Kansas Board of Education member Kathy Martin declared at the beginning of the hearings, "Evolution has been proven false. ID (Intelligent Design) is science-based and strong in facts." At their conclusion she proclaimed that evolution is "an unproven, often disproven" theory. "ID has theological implications. ID is not strictly Christian, but it is theistic," asserted Martin.

The scientific community rejects teaching intelligent design as science; a leading example being the United States National Academy of Sciences, which issued a policy statement saying "Creationism, intelligent design, and other claims of supernatural intervention in the origin of life or of species are not science because they are not testable by the methods of science." (See also List of scientific societies explicitly rejecting intelligent design)

The Kansas Board of Education voted 6–4 August 9, 2005, to include greater criticism of evolution in its school science standards. On February 13, 2007, the Board voted 6 to 4 to reject the amended science standards enacted in 2005.

== Background ==
The hearings were one of a number of Discovery Institute intelligent design campaigns that sought to establish new science education standards consistent with conservative Christian beliefs, both in the state and nationwide, and reverse what they saw as a domination in science education by actual science, specifically the scientific theory of evolution, which they viewed as atheistic, in direct conflict to their religious beliefs.

Kansas Board of Education elections in 2004 gave religious conservatives a 6–4 majority. In 2005, prompted by the Kansas Intelligent Design Network and the Discovery Institute, the board sought new high school science standards. The revisions did not eliminate evolution from instruction, but presented it as a theory greatly challenged and disputed, in line with the Discovery Institute's Teach the Controversy campaign. The new standards presented intelligent design as an alternative to evolution through the institute's Critical Analysis of Evolution. Board member Connie Morris sent a taxpayer-funded newsletter to constituents calling evolution an "age-old fairy tale" that was defended with "anti-God contempt and arrogance." Describing herself as a Christian who believes in a literal interpretation of Genesis, Morris wrote that evolution was "biologically, genetically, mathematically, chemically, metaphysically etc. wildly and utterly impossible."

The Intelligent Design Network originally proposed over 20 pages of revisions to the science standards. Their proposals were rejected by the science standards committee (made up of Kansas scientists and educators) appointed by the Board of Education, and were also rejected by 12 independent scientists who reviewed the proposed revisions.

Each side was invited to provide witnesses to testify before the board for intelligent design or evolution, with the taxpayers of Kansas covering the travel expenses. The scientific community refused to participate en masse. The pro-intelligent design group, the Intelligent Design Network, invited 22 witnesses. Among these were a number of non-scientists, and a number of scientists with no professional experience in biology.

== New science standards ==
On November 8, 2005, the Kansas Board of Education approved the following changes to its science standards:

1. Add to the mission statement a goal that science education should seek to help students make "informed" decisions.
2. Provide a definition of science that is not strictly limited to natural explanations. We also emphasize that the Science Curriculum Standards do not include Intelligent Design, the scientific disagreement with the claim of many evolutionary biologists that the apparent design of living systems is an illusion. While the testimony presented at the science hearings included many advocates of Intelligent Design, these standards neither mandate nor prohibit teaching about this scientific disagreement. (Note: The new definition adopted: "Science is a systematic method of continuing investigation that uses observations, hypothesis testing, measurement, experimentation, logical argument and theory building, to lead to more adequate explanations of natural phenomena.")
3. Allow intelligent design to be presented as an alternative explanation to evolution as presented in mainstream biology textbooks, without endorsing it.
4. State that evolution is a theory and not a fact.
5. Require informing students of purported scientific controversies regarding evolution.

=== Opposition to new standards ===
In addition to the over 70 scientific societies, institutions and other scientific professional groups that have issued statements supporting evolution education and opposing intelligent design, the Kansas Board of Education was presented a letter from 38 Nobel laureates, the Elie Wiesel Foundation for Humanity Nobel Laureates Initiative, calling upon the Board of Education to reject intelligent design and support the teaching of evolution. It stated:

Logically derived from confirmable evidence, evolution is understood to be the result of an unguided, unplanned process of random variation and natural selection. As the foundation of modern biology, its indispensable role has been further strengthened by the capacity to study DNA. In contrast, intelligent design is fundamentally unscientific; it cannot be tested as scientific theory because its central conclusion is based on belief in the intervention of a supernatural agent.

The Discovery Institute has consistently insisted that its Critical Analysis of Evolution lesson plan is not another attempt to open the door of public high school science classrooms for intelligent design, and hence supernatural explanations. Discovery Institute spokesman Casey Luskin in February 2006 coined the term "false fear syndrome" of those who said it was, and said:

This is simply another instance of Darwinists attempting to oppose critical analysis of evolution by pretending that it is equivalent to teaching intelligent design. This is a political tactic based upon misinformation, misrepresentation, emotions, and false fears.

In response, Nick Matzke says that it has proved that Critical Analysis of Evolution is a means of teaching all the intelligent design arguments without using the intelligent design label.

The Kansas science standards as proposed by the Discovery Institute and adopted by the state were said to be "ID in disguise" by an assistant of a Discovery Institute Fellow, confirming the criticisms of opponents to the standards. In discussing Discovery Institute radio commercials supporting their campaign airing in Kansas on the blog of William A. Dembski, Dembski's research assistant and co-moderator of the site, Joel Borofsky, said:

My hope is that ID will be taught properly in Kansas. Having been born and raised there I would love to claim to be from the first state to teach ID. There is a lot of movement among science high school teachers to never teach ID, even if it becomes a law because "we don't know how to teach philosophy. It would be nice to see them learn. I worked in a school and grew tired of hearing them speak of how it's wrong to point out the weaknesses in Darwin's theory because, "even if it is weak, it's still the best theory out there." (Shades of Dawkins anyone?)"

To the statement that the Kansas science standards had nothing to do with intelligent design but were only about teaching evolution in a "balanced" way, Borofsky responded:

It really is ID in disguise. The entire purpose behind all of this is to shift it into schools ... at least that is the hope/fear among some science teachers in the area. The problem is, if you are not going to be dogmatic in Darwinism that means you inevitably have to point out a fault or at least an alternative to Darwinism. So far, the only plausible theory is ID. If one is to challenge Darwin, then one must use ID. To challenge Darwin is to challenge natural selection/spontaneous first cause ... which is what the Kansas board is attempting to do. When you do that, you have to invoke the idea of ID.

In response to the reception to his comments, Dembski's research assistant issued a clarification, stating that he was only voicing his personal opinion, not that of others in the movement, and that he is Dembski's "assistant on theological work, not necessarily the ID movement."

The Discovery Institute continues to deny allegations that its true agenda is religious, and downplays the religious source of much of its funding. In an interview of Stephen C. Meyer when ABC News asked about the Discovery Institute's many evangelical Christian donors the institute's public relations representative stopped the interview saying "I don't think we want to go down that path."

Both the National Academy of Sciences and the National Science Teachers Association spoke out against the new science standards; in addition to separate statements from each opposing the standards, the two groups issued a joint statement that the new Kansas standards are improved, but as currently written, they overemphasize controversy in the theory of evolution and distort the definition of science. The National Academy of Sciences and National Science Teachers Association offered to work with the board to resolve these issues so the state standards could use text from the National Research Council's National Science Education Standards and National Science Teachers Association's Pathways to Science Standards, though they ultimately declined to grant use of the text due to Kansas State Board of Education members insisting on language "emphasizing controversy in the theory of evolution" and "distorting the definition of science."

The position of the scientific community is that there is no controversy to teach, that evolution is widely accepted within the scientific community as a valid, well-supported theory and that such disagreements that do exist are about the details of evolution's mechanisms, not the validity of evolution itself.

For example, the National Association of Biology Teachers in a statement endorsing evolution as noncontroversial quoted Theodosius Dobzhansky "nothing in biology makes sense except in the light of evolution" and went on to state that the quote "accurately reflects the central, unifying role of evolution in biology. The theory of evolution provides a framework that explains both the history of life and the ongoing adaptation of organisms to environmental challenges and changes." They emphasized that "Scientists have firmly established evolution as an important natural process" and that "The selection of topics covered in a biology curriculum should accurately reflect the principles of biological science. Teaching biology in an effective and scientifically honest manner requires that evolution be taught in a standards-based instructional framework with effective classroom discussions and laboratory experiences."

=== Support for new standards ===
The hub of the intelligent design movement, the Discovery Institute and its Center for Science and Culture, played a central role in bringing about the Kansas evolution hearings, first by supporting ID proponents in their bids for seats on the board, and later in aggressively lobbying for a "Teach the Controversy" solution. Teach the Controversy is a controversial political-action campaign originating from the Discovery Institute that seeks to advance an education policy for US public schools that introduces intelligent design to public school science curricula and seeks to redefine science to allow for supernatural explanations by eliminating "methodological naturalism" from science and replacing it with "theistic realism". Teach the Controversy proponents portray evolution as a "theory in crisis."

As well as proposing its own draft science standards to the Kansas State Board of Education and Critical Analysis of Evolution high school lesson plan, the Discovery Institute participated in presenting a letter to the Kansas State Board of Education from Institute associate, Dr. Philip S. Skell. A notable intelligent design proponent, Dr. Skell's letter to the board touts the alleged benefits of the Teach the Controversy approach, as well his credentials as a member of the National Academy of Sciences, despite the fact the National Academy of Sciences issued a policy statement against the Teach the Controversy solution and intelligent design as a concept.

Two intelligent design proponents, John H. Calvert, a lawyer and a managing director of Intelligent Design Network, Inc., and William S. Harris, Ph.D., co-author with Calvert of Intelligent Design: The Scientific Alternative to Evolution (National Catholic Bioethics Quarterly, Autumn 2003) were instrumental in pushing for the successful adoption of the new standards, including submitting a Suggested Findings of Fact and Conclusions of Law and numerous other documents. Both are active participants in the intelligent design movement.

Discovery Institute fellows used the media coverage of the hearings to take their message to the public. The institute's vice president and program director, Stephen C. Meyer, appeared on the Fox News show The Big Story with John Gibson, where he debated Eugenie Scott, executive director of the National Center for Science Education. There Meyer sought to convey the institute's message that debate over evolution is not a ploy to get religious ideas into public schools, that evolution is a theory in crisis, and that students were currently being taught in error there was no scientific controversy over evolution.

The proposed changes were not supported by most of the 26 members of the panel that reviews state science curriculum.

=== Decision ===
On November 8, 2005, the Board of Education voted to instruct science students along the lines of the Discovery Institute, that evolution could not rule out a supernatural or theistic source, that evolution itself was not fact but only a theory and one in crisis, and that ID must be considered a viable alternative to evolution.

== List of participants ==
The following is a list of those who testified in the Kansas evolution hearings (in order), most of whom are affiliated with the Discovery Institute and all of whom are intelligent design advocates or other forms of creationists, or advocates of some other form of anti-evolution.

April 19, 2005 (Prehearings Statements)

1. Pedro L. Irigonegaray (for mainstream science)

May 5, 2005

1. William S. Harris – Biochemist, Professor of Medicine, University of Missouri at Kansas City, Director of the Lipoprotein Research Laboratory, St. Luke's Hospital, Kansas City, Missouri, signer of the Discovery Institute's A Scientific Dissent from Darwinism, and co-author, with John Calvert, of Intelligent Design: The Scientific Alternative to Evolution.
2. Charles Thaxton – Editor of the book Of Pandas and People, Fellow of the Discovery Institute's Center for Science and Culture, signer of the Discovery Institute's A Scientific Dissent from Darwinism.
3. Jonathan Wells – author of Icons of Evolution and Fellow of the Discovery Institute's Center for Science and Culture, signer of the Discovery Institute's A Scientific Dissent from Darwinism.
4. Bruce Simat – Associate Professor of Biology at Northwestern College in St. Paul, Minnesota, signer of the Discovery Institute's A Scientific Dissent from Darwinism.
5. Giuseppe Sermonti – Chief Editor of Rivista di Biologia/Biology Forum and author of Why Is a Fly Not a Horse? which is published by the Discovery Institute.
6. Ralph Seelke – PhD Professor of Microbiology, University of Wisconsin – Superior, self-described Christian apologetist, signer of the Discovery Institute's A Scientific Dissent from Darwinism.

May 6, 2005

1. Edward Peltzer – Oceanographer, associate editor, Marine Chemistry, senior research specialist, Monterey Bay Aquarium Research Institute, signer of the Discovery Institute's A Scientific Dissent from Darwinism.
2. Russell Carlson – Professor of Biochemistry and Molecular Biology University of Georgia, signer of the Discovery Institute's A Scientific Dissent from Darwinism. Member of DI research fellow William Dembski's The International Society for Complexity, Information, and Design (ISCID)
3. John C. Sanford – Cornell University Associate Professor of Horticultural Sciences, inventor of the "gene gun," intelligent design advocate.
4. Robert DiSilvestro – Biochemist, Professor of Nutrition, Ohio State University, signer of the Discovery Institute's A Scientific Dissent from Darwinism.
5. Bryan Leonard – High school biology teacher, involved in a doctoral thesis controversy in which he was supported by the Discovery Institute.
6. Dan Ely – Professor of Biology, University of Akron in Ohio, self-described intelligent design teacher who assisted in drafting the adopted lesson plan.
7. Roger DeHart – High school biology teacher, Oaks Christian High School in Westlake Village, California, who claims teaching intelligent design cost him two jobs. Author of a companion study guide Icons of Evolution- A Study Guide to Jonathan Wells' Icons of Evolution.
8. Jill Gonzalez-Bravo – eighth grade Kansas science teacher, who endorsed the Discovery Institute-promulgated science standards in her testimony and in an interview conducted by the Discovery Institute. Additionally, Gonzalez-Bravo appeared in a commercial favoring the teaching of intelligent design.
9. John Millam – Software developer, signer of the Discovery Institute's A Scientific Dissent from Darwinism, denier of common dissent, advocate of intelligent design.

May 7, 2005

1. Nancy Bryson – Former Division Head of the Dept of Science and Mathematics at Mississippi University for Women who claims to have lost her position over a presentation Critical Thinking on Evolution that presented alternatives to Darwinian evolution. A senior professor of biology derided the speech as "religion masquerading as science." Bryson is often cited by the Discovery Institute as one who was "demonized and blacklisted" by "Darwinian fundamentalists."
2. James Barham – Scholar, author, intelligent design advocate specializing in evolutionary epistemology, the philosophy of mind, and the foundations of biology, known for "Why I am not a Darwinist" in Debating Darwin, From Darwin to DNA and quoted in Dembski's Uncommon Dissent ... Intellectuals Who Find Darwinism Unconvincing.
3. Stephen C. Meyer – Program Director of the Discovery Institute's Center for Science and Culture, Discovery Institute co-founder, signer of the Discovery Institute's A Scientific Dissent from Darwinism.
4. Angus Menuge – philosopher of science, Dept. of Philosophy Concordia University, Mequon, Wisconsin, who participated in Discovery Institute sponsored symposia leading up to the 2006 election for seats opening in the state Board of Education. Menuge also describes himself as someone whose interests "now are in promoting Christian teaching and scholarship ...".
5. Warren Nord – Professor of Philosophy of Religion and Education, University of North Carolina, Chapel Hill, and Kitzmiller v. Dover Area School District defense witness who withdrew before testifying along with other Discovery Institute associates William Dembski, John Campbell, and Stephen C. Meyer.
6. Mustafa Akyol – Columnist in the Turkish daily newspaper Referans, and freelance writer in the U.S., vocal advocate of intelligent design.
7. Michael Behe – Biochemist at Lehigh University and prominent intelligent design proponent, Center for Science and Culture Fellow, and signer of the Discovery Institute's A Scientific Dissent from Darwinism, presented irreducible complexity with the claim that it was supported by a paper he had co-authored with David Snoke.
8. John Calvert – Lawyer who has worked closely with the Discovery Institute in finding constitutionally allowable ways to bring intelligent design and failing there, Teach the Controversy, into public schools. Managing Director of Intelligent Design network, inc., an organization that seeks intelligent design taught in public education.

May 12, 2005 (Closing Statements)

1. Pedro L. Irigonegaray (for mainstream science)
2. John Calvert (for intelligent design)

== Result ==
The Kansas Board of Education voted 6–4 August 9, 2005, to include greater criticism of evolution in its school science standards, but it decided to send the standards to an outside academic for review before taking a final vote. The standards received final approval on November 8, 2005. The new standards were approved by 6 to 4, reflecting the makeup of religious conservatives on the board. In July 2006, the Board of Standards issued a "rationale statement" which claimed that the current science curriculum standards do not include intelligent design. Members of the scientific community critical of the standards contended that the board's statement was misleading in that they contained a "significant editorializing that supports the Discovery Institute and the Intelligent Design network's campaign position that Intelligent Design is not included in the standards", the standards did "say that students should learn about ID, and that ID content ought to be in the standards", and that the standards presented the controversy over intelligent design as a scientific one, denying the mainstream scientific view.

Kansas joined Ohio in adopting the Discovery Institute's Critical Analysis of Evolution public school science standards during that period. While other states were backing away from teaching alternatives to evolution, the Oklahoma House passed a bill on March 2, 2006, that contained Discovery Institute language encouraging schools to expose students to alternative views about the origin of life. Popular reaction included the creation of the intelligent design parody Pastafarianism (the worship of a Flying Spaghetti Monster). Its founder insisted it should be offered as a "third" theory on origins, suggesting possible legal action if it was not included and intelligent design was.

On August 1, 2006, 4 of the 6 conservative Republicans who approved the Critical Analysis of Evolution classroom standards lost their seats in a primary election. The moderate Republican and liberal Democrats gaining seats, largely supported by Governor Kathleen Sebelius, vowed to overturn the 2005 school science standards and adopt those recommended by a State Board Science Hearing Committee that were rejected by the previous board.

One of the members who lost her seat, Connie Morris, a conservative from St. Francis in the northwest corner of the state, pointed to the "liberal media" for her loss, stating that "liberal opportunists" do not mind "slandering people and harming their families and their reputation and their business and their communities and their state ... It's a shame, and I feel bad for them when they face God on Judgment Day." Although four members who claimed to be born-again Christians remained on the Board, she believed that the new board would waste no time adopting new science standards, expecting that in the following January, when the new members were sworn in, the Board would rescind existing standards and adopt new ones that "let government schools teach children that we are no more than chaotic, random mutants."

On February 13, 2007, the Board voted 6 to 4 to reject the amended science standards enacted in 2005. The definition of science was once again returned to "the search for natural explanations for what is observed in the universe."

== See also ==
- Kansas vs. Darwin (film)
- Flying Spaghetti Monster, a satirical religion first described in an open letter to the Kansas School Board by Bobby Henderson
- Conservapedia, a consequence of its conservative founder attempting to edit the Wikipedia article on the hearings.
