= Giuseppe Sermonti =

Italian professor of genetics (1925–2018)

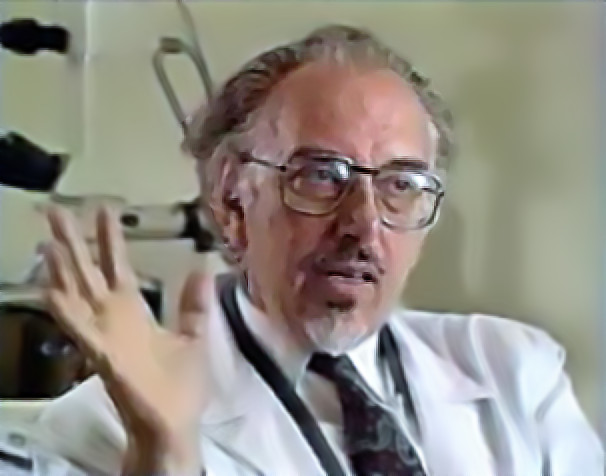
Giuseppe Sermonti

Giuseppe Sermonti (4 October 1925 – 16 December 2018) was an Italian professor of genetics who criticized natural selection as the deciding factor of human biology.

== Biography ==
=== Early life and career ===
Born in Rome, graduated in agriculture and genetics, he entered the Superior Institute of Health in 1950, founding a department of Microbiological Genetics. He became professor of genetics at the University of Camerino, then at the University of Palermo in 1965, and finally moved to the University of Perugia in 1970, where he was emeritus professor and managed the Genetics Institute of the University from 1974. From 1970 to 1971 he presided over the Associazione Genetica Italiana.

Together with Guido Pontecorvo, he was the discoverer of the genetic parasexual recombination in antibiotic-producing Penicillium and Streptomyces species. He was vice-president of the XIV International Congress of Genetics held in Moscow and he was appointed as president of the International Committee of the Working Group on Genetics of Industrial Microorganisms. In 1994 Sermonti attended an AIDS denial conference in Bologna where he spoke on the damages of campaigning against AIDS rather than HIV.

=== Publishing ===
In 1971 Sermonti published Il Crepuscolo dello Scientismo (in English The Twilight of Scientism), a post-modernist critique of science. In 1980 Sermonti published a book Dopo Darwin (After Darwin) co-authored with Roberto Fondi, which critiqued aspects of Neo-Darwinism as the fundamental model for evolution. From 1979 to 2012, Sermonti was chief editor of Rivista di Biologia-Biology Forum.

Between 1986 and 1989 Sermonti produced three books on the hermeneutics of fairy tales, entitled Fiabe di Tre Reami (Fairy Tales of Three Realms), arguing that they contained unexpressed principles of science: Snow White is the narrative of cupellation as well as of the phases of the moon; Red Riding Hood is the story of mercury; Cinderella is the tale of sulfur. In 1987 Sermonti was one of the founding members of the Osaka "Group for the Study of Dynamic Structure" which holds the view of process structuralism.

=== Philosophical perspectives ===
An acknowledged critic of Neo-Darwinian theory, Sermonti's view was that evolution encompasses more than Neo-Darwinism. At times his views have been incorrectly misrepresented and conflated with Creationism. This connection is however, a perspective that based on evidence he did not agree with. Moreover, considering his multiple documented statements denying that he was not a creationist, coupled with the content of his published works this certainly seems a substantial misreading. Like many academic critics of Neo-Darwinism parts of his work have been cherry picked by Creationists. In 1993 Sermonti published in Answers in Genesis's young earth creation magazine, an article entitled "Not from the apes", a philosophical style critique of aspects of scientific and evolutionary theory in the sense of Gould and Lewontin's critique of 'unverifiable narrative explanations', or 'Just so Stories'. The young earth creationist Henry M. Morris cited Sermonti (along with Guy Berthault, Roberto Fondi and Wolfgang Smith) as a Roman Catholic creationist in response to John Paul II's 1996 statement on evolution, but Sermonti did not describe himself as either a Roman Catholic or a creationist.

Sermonti was often engaged in discussions of the processes and limits of current evolutionary theory, whether it be Neo-Darwinism or Process Structuralism with both a broad range of scientists, philosophers and theists. He was one of the signatories of the Discovery Institute's "A Scientific Dissent From Darwinism", a petition which the intelligent design movement uses to promote intelligent design by attempting to cast doubt on evolution. Sermonti did not deny, nor doubt evolution. He merely that the Neo-Darwinian model was not an adequate or complete form of explanation for evolution, and consequently was deserving of more rigorous critique by those studying evolution. Sermonti attended the Kansas evolution hearings with the Discovery Institute in 2005 but no transcript of his testimony exists as the court reporter could not understand what he was saying due to his strong Italian accent. His book Dimenticare Darwin (Forgetting Darwin) was published in 1999 and was translated into English as Why Is a Fly Not a Horse? which was published by the Discovery Institute and edited by Jonathan Wells. In the book, he denies being a creationist, saying that "For the reservations I harbor about Evolutionism, I have been accused of being a Creationist. I am not: if I am allowed, I would only aspire to being a creature".

== Publications ==
=== Biology ===
- Sermonti, Giuseppe. Osservazioni sulla meiosi di un ibrido pentaploide di frumento (in Italian). ICCU TO02135077.
- Sermonti, Giuseppe (1949). Osservazioni cariologiche sul frumento Strampelli 'Terminillo' (Triticum vulgare 'Rieti' X Secale cereale) X T. vulgare 'Rieti'. Annali della sperimentazione agraria (in Italian). ICCU TO02135075.
- Sermonti, Giuseppe (1950). Osservazioni citologiche su ibridi di aegilops ovata l. x triticum vulgare host. e tr. dicoccum schulb (in Italian). ICCU TO02135079.
- Sermonti, Giuseppe (1969). Genetics of Antibiotic-Producing Microorganisms. London: Wiley. OCLC 860319275.
- Sermonti, Giuseppe (1971). Genetica generale (in Italian). Turin: Boringhieri. ICCU SBL0357806.
- Sermonti, Giuseppe (1972). Vita coniugale dei batteri: la genetica nel mondo dei microbi (in Italian). Bologna: Zanichelli. ICCU SBL0438387.
- Sermonti, Giuseppe (1981). Le forme della vita: introduzione alla biologia (in Italian). Roma: Armando. ICCU RAV0124624.
- Sermonti, Giuseppe. "Mendel: nascita e rinascita della genetica". Versuche über Pflanzen-Hybriden [Esperienza sugli ibridi delle piante]. By Mendel, Gregor. (in Italian). Translated by Anna Petris. Brescia: La Scuola. ISBN 88-350-7516-5.

=== Criticism of science ===
- Sermonti, Giuseppe (1971). Il crepuscolo dello scientismo: critica della scienza pura e delle sue impurità (in Italian). Milan: Rusconi. ICCU FOG0054431.
- Sermonti, Giuseppe; Fondi, Roberto (1980). Dopo Darwin: critica all'evoluzionismo (in Italian). Milan: Rusconi. ICCU SBL0327496.
- Sermonti, Giuseppe (June 1993). "Not from the apes". Creation. Vol. 15, no. 3. p. 13. ISSN 0819-1530.
- Sermonti, Giuseppe (1999). Dimenticare Darwin: ombre sull'evoluzione (in Italian). Milan: Rusconi. ISBN 88-18-01166-9.
- Illich, Ivan; Sermonti, Giuseppe (2015). La cospirazione cristiana: nella tirannia della scienza e della tecnica (dialogue) (in Italian). Florence: Libreria Editrice Fiorentina. ISBN 978-88-6500-073-1.

=== Fairy tales ===
- Fiabe di Tre Reami (Fairy Tales of Three Realms), 1985–1989, 2004 (La Finestra, Trento) ISBN 88-88097-31-7
