= Claudio Chillemi =

Italian science fiction and fantasy writer

- Born: 11 May 1964 (age 62) Catania, Italy
- Occupation: writer, teacher
- Genre: science fiction, fantasy

Claudio Chillemi (born 11 May 1964) is an Italian writer, active mainly in science fiction and fantasy. In speculative fiction he has received awards in several editions of the Premio Italia (the main award of Italy's science-fiction and fantasy fandom) and the Premio Vegetti. His short fiction has appeared in United States and French magazines, including The Magazine of Fantasy & Science Fiction, NewMyths, Black Cat Weekly and Galaxies.

== Biography ==
=== Early work and theatre ===
Chillemi was born in Catania in 1964 and is a teacher. In 1988 he published the poetry collection La voce della memoria. In 1992 he published the short-story collection C'è qualcuno là fuori? and collaborated with the amateur magazine Zap. In 1994 he worked as a comics writer on Antehac 20.87 and Il tocco dell'innocenza.

In the mid-1990s Chillemi began writing theatre texts for young readers and received recognition in the Teatro e Natura and Arte per la Pace competitions. In 2000 he received the Premio Giovannino Guareschi for the short story L'ultima visita. After the award, the story was published in the Gazzetta di Parma. In 2003 he published the handbook Fare teatro a scuola.

=== Fantasy and science fiction ===
In 2004 Chillemi published the novel Federico piccolo grande re, devoted to the youth of Frederick II, Holy Roman Emperor. In 2010 the novel appeared in a new edition under the title Federico: la favolosa infanzia di un sovrano leggendario. The series continued with L'aquila nera, L'isola di cristallo and La corona spezzata, historical-fantasy novels about the young Frederick II in a Sicily with magical and mythological elements.

In 2009 Chillemi published the science-fiction novel Kronos, later republished by Delos Digital in 2026. The novel has been described as a crime story with science-fiction elements, connected with the multinational corporation Kronos and with themes such as alternate history, parallel universes and time travel. The cycle continued with Il lato oscuro della Kronos and Quel che resta della Kronos. Quel che resta della Kronos won the Premio Italia and the Premio Vegetti in the science-fiction novel category.

Between 2016 and 2021 he published the three short novels of the L'Immortalità cycle: Soluzione Omega, L'universo muto and I tre stati dell'acqua. The cycle treats the theme of immortality in a science-fiction mode. In 2022 his story Il Bloop was published in Mondadori's Urania Millemondi line. In 2024 he published Katàne, a science-fiction crime novel set in a future Catania devastated by a geological catastrophe.

=== International collaborations ===
In 2014 Chillemi published, with Paul Di Filippo, the story The Via Panisperna Boys in "Operation Harmony" in The Magazine of Fantasy & Science Fiction. The story is an alternate history about Ettore Majorana. The story Con gli occhi del nemico was published in French in Galaxies under the title Par les yeux de l'ennemi. In 2023 the story The Keen and Cutting Stones, written with Di Filippo, appeared in NewMyths. In 2024 Black Cat Weekly published Maximinus Thrax and the Gates of Chaos, also written with Di Filippo. The stories written with Di Filippo were collected in Dieselpunk, published by Delos Digital in 2023; the collection combines science fiction, weird fiction, alternate history, dieselpunk and Sicilian settings.

=== Fondazione SF Magazine and Aetnacon ===
In 2012 Chillemi founded the association Fondazione Science Fiction in Catania with Antonino Di Mari, Enrico Di Stefano and Rosaria Leonardi. The association has produced the fanzine Fondazione Science Fiction Magazine and organizes Aetnacon, described as the first Sicilian convention devoted to science fiction and fantasy. Aetnacon reached its fifteenth edition in 2024.

== Reception ==
In 2010 Pino Cottogni presented Kronos on Fantascienza.com as a novel that combines a police investigation with a science-fiction setting. In 2023 Carmine Treanni, writing in Wired Italia, described Dieselpunk as a collection born from the collaboration between Chillemi and Paul Di Filippo and highlighted its relationship with the dieselpunk imagination and with its Sicilian setting. In 2024 Carmelo Di Mauro presented Katàne in La Sicilia as an interweaving of investigative thriller, archaeology and a post-apocalyptic future.

== Awards and recognition ==
=== Premio Giovannino Guareschi ===
- 2000 – Best short story on the "small world" theme for L'ultima visita.

=== Premio Italia ===
- 2009 – Best story in an amateur publication for Guardia medica.
- 2010 – Best article in an amateur publication for Star Trek e lo scisma.
- 2011 – Best story in an amateur publication for Il lato oscuro della Kronos.
- 2015 – Best story in a professional publication for Né la prima né l'ultima volta.
- 2016 – Best science-fiction novel for Quel che resta della Kronos.
- 2016 – Best story in a professional publication for Con gli occhi del nemico.
- 2017 – Best story in a professional publication for Soluzione Omega.
- 2019 – Best story in an amateur publication for Il Grande Errore.
- 2022 – Best fantasy novel for L'aquila nera.
- 2023 – Best fantasy novel for L'isola di cristallo.
- 2023 – Best story in a professional publication for Il Bloop.
- 2024 – Best story in a professional publication for CiFlac.
- 2024 – Best article in an amateur publication for Il Fantastico Totò.
- 2025 – Best science-fiction novel for Katàne.
- 2025 – Best article in an amateur publication for The Fab Four - Il Fantastico Mondo dei Beatles.

=== Premio Vegetti ===
- 2016 – Best science-fiction novel for Quel che resta della Kronos.

== Works ==
=== Novels and short novels ===
- Federico piccolo grande re: La giovinezza del più grande sovrano del Medioevo tra storia e leggenda. Catania: L'almanacco. 2004. ISBN 9788888402178. ICCU CFI0655322. Reissued as: Federico: La favolosa infanzia di un sovrano leggendario. Cocktail no. 6. Arese: Edizioni della Vigna. 2010. ISBN 9788862760690. ICCU VIA0204136.
- Kronos. Fermenti no. 3. Arese: Edizioni della Vigna. 2009. ISBN 9788862760225. ICCU MIL0786354. Reissued as: Kronos. Odissea Gold no. 17. Milan: Delos Digital. 2026. ISBN 9788825433920. ICCU RAV2218561.
- Il lato oscuro della Kronos. Fermenti no. 9. Arese: Edizioni della Vigna. 2011. ISBN 9788862760744. ICCU MIL0815199. Reissued as: Il lato oscuro della Kronos. Odissea Fantascienza no. 72. Milan: Delos Digital. 2019. ISBN 9788825409529.
- Quel che resta della Kronos. Fermenti. Arese: Edizioni della Vigna. 2015. ISBN 9788862761420. ICCU MIL0919820. Reissued as: Quel che resta della Kronos. Odissea Fantascienza no. 74. Milan: Delos Digital. 2019. ISBN 9788825409895.
- Soluzione Omega. Robotica.it no. 40. Milan: Delos Digital. 2016. ISBN 9788825400526.
- L'universo muto. Robotica.it no. 68. Milan: Delos Digital. 2019. ISBN 9788825410457.
- L'aquila nera. Convoy no. 81. Milan: Delos Digital. 2021. ISBN 9788825416596. ICCU BVE0907456.
- I tre stati dell'acqua. Robotica.it no. 80. Milan: Delos Digital. 2021. ISBN 9788825416688.
- L'isola di cristallo. Convoy no. 92. Milan: Delos Digital. 2022. ISBN 9788825422436. ICCU MIL1077093.
- Katàne. Odissea Fantascienza no. 159. Milan: Delos Digital. 2024. ISBN 9788825430332. ICCU BVE0982948.
- La corona spezzata. Odissea Fantasy no. 2. Milan: Delos Digital. 2026. ISBN 9788825435719.

=== Collections and short fiction ===
- C'è qualcuno là fuori?. CDE. 1992.
- "L'ultima visita". Gazzetta di Parma (in Italian). 2000.
- "Guardia medica". Fondazione SF Magazine (in Italian). No. 14. 2008.
- "Il Grande Errore". I sogni di Cartesio (in Italian). Edizioni della Vigna. 2013.
- Chillemi, Claudio; Di Filippo, Paul (January–February 2014). "The Via Panisperna Boys in "Operation Harmony"". The Magazine of Fantasy & Science Fiction.
- Né la prima né l'ultima volta. Robotica.it no. 12. Milan: Delos Digital. 2014. ISBN 9788867756025.
- Con gli occhi del nemico. Robotica.it no. 19. Milan: Delos Digital. 2015. ISBN 9788867758081.
- Chillemi, Claudio; Di Filippo, Paul (2015). "The Horror at Gancio Rosso". Acheron Books.
- "Carne gialla". Operazione Europa (in Italian). Elara. 2016.
- "Par les yeux de l'ennemi". Galaxies (in French). No. 44. 2016.
- "Il buco in fronte". Robot (in Italian). No. 80. Delos Books. 2017.
- Carne gialla. Robotica.it no. 49. Milan: Delos Digital. 2017. ISBN 9788825404036.
- "Il Grande Errore". Fondazione SF (in Italian). 2018.
- "Il Quarto Livello". Delos Science Fiction (in Italian). No. 217. Delos Books. 2020.
- "Il Grande Errore". Mondi paralleli (in Italian). Delos Digital. 2020.
- "Dove le strade non hanno nome. Dove le persone non hanno volto". Delos Science Fiction (in Italian). No. 226. Delos Books. 2021.
- Dissolvenza in Corpo 15. Innsmouth no. 49. Milan: Delos Digital. 2021. ISBN 9788825417456.
- Diario clandestino di una invasione aliena. Robotica.it no. 86. Milan: Delos Digital. 2022. ISBN 9788825420333.
- "Il Bloop". Urania Millemondi (in Italian). No. 93. July 2022.
- Chillemi, Claudio; Di Filippo, Paul (2023). "The Keen and Cutting Stones". NewMyths. Vol. 17, no. 63.
- Di Filippo, Paul; Chillemi, Claudio (2023). Dieselpunk. Odissea Fantascienza no. 138. Translated by Salvatore Deodato. Milan: Delos Digital. ISBN 9788825425765. ICCU MIL1101706.
- Di Filippo, Paul; Chillemi, Claudio (2024). "Maximinus Thrax and the Gates of Chaos". Black Cat Weekly. No. 154.

=== Essays ===
- Fare teatro a scuola: Manuale per la realizzazione di un laboratorio teatrale. Catania: L'almanacco. 2003. ICCU PAL0207648.
- "Star Trek e lo scisma". Fondazione SF Magazine (in Italian). No. 15. 2009.

=== Poetry ===
- La voce della memoria. Ragusa: Cultura Duemila. 1988. ICCU CFI0139778.

=== Comics ===
- Antehac 20.87. Omega Press. 1994.
- Il tocco dell'innocenza. Omega Press. 1994.
