= Kansas vs. Darwin =

Kansas vs. Darwin is a feature-length documentary film about the 2005 Kansas evolution hearings. It was released by Unconditional Films on DVD in December, 2007, and again on an enhanced-edition DVD in November, 2008, through New Day Films. This was the first feature film for Director Jeff Tamblyn. Shot at the hearings in Topeka, it also includes interviews with most of the principals in the event and many others, including then-president of the National Academy of Sciences, Bruce Alberts.

== Overview ==
Shooting on the film began over a month before the hearings. In order to gain access to all major figures on both sides, the producers and the production crew withheld their personal views on evolution, promising all subjects they were making a piece that would be politically neutral and without prejudicial editing. The film had to be edited twice in order to achieve the final product - a purely political documentary equally featuring all relevant points of view.

The significance of the Kansas evolution hearings, which Kansas vs. Darwin documents, is that it's the first venue in which the "critical thinking" strategy of creationism/Intelligent Design activists was successfully used: the argument that teaching the "weaknesses" of the theory of evolution contributes to a more "balanced view" of science, and that this curricular approach encourages critical thinking.

Kansas vs. Darwin depicts an instance in which the doctrine of separation of church and state was tested at the state level. The rewriting of Kansas state science teaching standards by Christian conservatives to include conclusions not recognized by mainstream science but supportive of their faith raises the question of whether the First Amendment of the U.S. Constitution was violated. Because the rewriting of the standards was overturned after a subsequent election, this question was never argued in court.

The film also documents the worldwide boycott of the hearings by mainstream science, led by a group called Kansas Citizens for Science. Their rationale for not appearing at the hearings to answer the challenge to evolution as a bedrock theory of modern science was that by agreeing to appear side-by-side with the witnesses who supported creationism and Intelligent Design, they would endow these ideas with further, undue legitimacy.

== List of Subjects Appearing in Kansas vs. Darwin ==
- Steve Abrams - Kansas State School Board
- Connie Morris - Kansas State School Board
- Kathy Martin - Kansas State School Board
- Harry McDonald - Kansas Citizens for Science
- Jack Krebs - Kansas Citizens for Science
- Burt Humburg - Kansas Citizens for Science
- Rachel Robson - Kansas Citizens for Science
- John Calvert - Intelligent Design Network
- William Harris - Intelligent Design Network
- Pedro Irigonegaray - Attorney charged with cross-examining witnesses

== Filmmakers ==
- Jeff Tamblyn - Director, Co-Producer, Co-Writer
- Jeff Peak - Co-Producer, Director of Photography
- Mark von Schlemmer - Editor, Co-Writer
