= Sermonti =

Sermonti is a family name of Italian origin. Notable people with the surname include:

- Giuseppe Sermonti (1925–2018), Italian biologist
- Pietro Sermonti (born 1971), Italian actor
