= Mirandola Revolt =

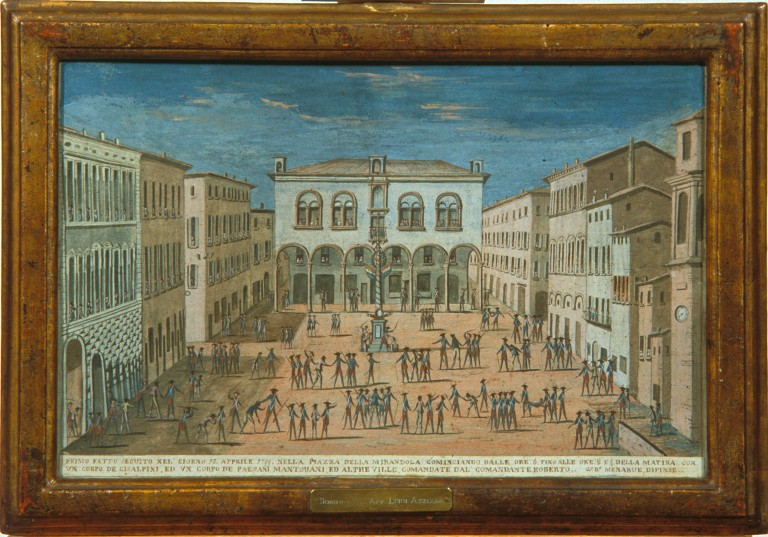
Battle in the piazza at Mirandola, 1799.

The Mirandola Revolt occurred in Mirandola and the north part of the Province of Modena, breaking out on 15 April 1799 as part of wider revolts against Napoleonic domination of the Panaro department in the Cisalpine Republic.

== Context ==
After Napoleon left to invade Egypt, the balance of power in Italy broke down and wars resumed - marshal Paul Kray von Krajowa and Austrian troops retook Lombardy-Veneto, including the important stronghold of Mantua The central administration of Panaro, based in Modena, feared an imminent invasion of the north of the province of Modena, which by then had become border country. They guarded the central piazza in Mirandola with 250 national guards from the Cisalpine artillery regiment, commanded by a captainn Frattocchio, along with 150 civic guards and 100 volunteers from Mirandola. Soon afterwards these were joined by another artillery company from Modena.

In the meantime, although the Imperial troops did not rush to attack Modena, their supporters in the north of the province were gaining in strength - many citizens, farmers and artisans in San Benedetto Po, Gonzaga, Moglia, Quistello, and Poggio Rusco armed themselves with pitchforks, shovels and a few muskets to "defend their own liberty" from the threat of the French and the Jacobins. The leader of these volunteers was the conservative lawyer Tommaso Roberti (or Ruberti) from Quistello.

== Results ==
On 18 April the Provisional Deputation of Mirandola was formed, with Domenico Personali as president. After being abandoned by the Germans, on 25 and 26 April the French (led by general Charles Antoine Liébault and supported by the Armée du Sud under general Joseph Hélie Désiré Perruquet de Montrichard who was on his way back to France) recaptured Mirandola for a few hours. Three days later, after the French left, the Austrians retook it and governed it for around a year.

On 12 June 1799, during the Battle of Modena, the French general Étienne Macdonald defeated the Austrian Prince Friedrich Franz Xaver of Hohenzollern-Hechingen, who retired towards Mirandola.

On his return to Europe, Napoleon seized power and began his second Italian campaign, winning the Battle of Marengo. Pro-Austrian soldiers quickly fled Mirandola and the Tree of Liberty was raised again in its main square. On 25 June 1800, Napoleon also retook Modena, thus putting an end to anti-French uprisings in the Modenese and Mantuan plains.

== Bibliography ==
- "Mirandole, le 16 Avril". Le courier de l'Empire: Journal historique, politique et littéraire, pour l'an de grace 1799 (in French). No. 106. Monaco di Baviera: chez François Hübschmann. 4 May 1799. p. 423.
- Belagerung und Einnahme von Mirandola - Feldzüge der Oesterreicher und Russen in Italien im Jahre 1799. Nebst Kriegscharten und Planen; begleitet mit historischen und kritischen Nachrichten und Bemerkungen (etc.) (in German). Lipsia: Reinicke und Hinrichs. 1800.
- Alph. de Beauchamp (1800). Campagne des austro-russes en Italie en 1799 (in French). Vol. 2. Reinicke et Hinrichs. pp. 33–34.
- Cappi, Vilmo (1991). "L'insorgenza transpadana del 1799 e i "fatti" della Mirandola in due dipinti coevi". Quaderni della Bassa Modenese (in Italian) (20). San Felice sul Panaro: 49–54.
- Ceretti, Felice (1878). "Il Sacco della Mirandola nel 1799. Narrazione storica". La Fenice: Strenna Mirandolese per l'Anno 1879 (in Italian). Mirandola: 33–48.
- Marchesi, Giuseppe (1984). "La rivoluzione in provincia: i fatti del 1799 nella cronaca di un sanfeliciano". Quaderni della Bassa Modenese (in Italian) (5). San Felice sul Panaro: 37–46.
- Morselli, Giuseppe (1976). Mirandola: 30 secoli di cronaca. San Prospero: CPE-Centro Programmazione Editoriale. pp. 109–112. ICCU MOD0048091.
- Riccò, Roberto (2014). "Cronache della presa della città della Mirandola, 15 aprile 1799: insorgenze antifrancesi nei Ducati Estensi durante il triennio giacobino (1796-1799)". Terra e identità (in Italian). Modena. ICCU MOD1641385.
