= Steve Fuller (sociologist) =

American philosopher and sociologist (born 1959)

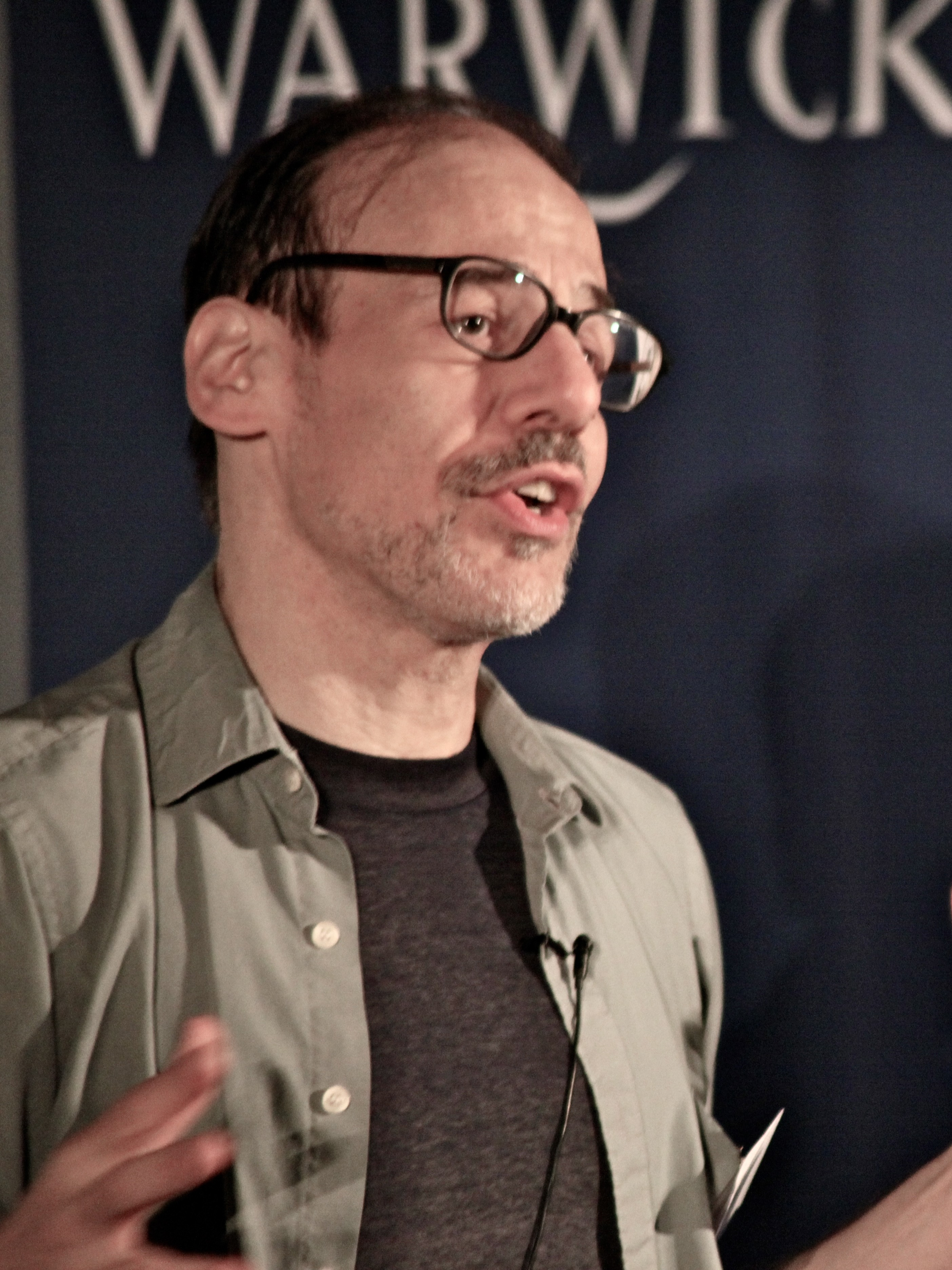
- Fuller in 2011
- Born: Steve William Fuller; July 12, 1959 (age 67); New York City, U.S.
- Education: Columbia University (BA); Clare College, Cambridge (MPhil); University of Pittsburgh (PhD)
- Occupations: Academic philosopher and professor
- Title: Auguste Comte Chair in Social Epistemology at the University of Warwick, England
- Website: warwick.ac.uk/fac/soc/sociology/staff/sfuller

Steve William Fuller (born July 12, 1959) is an American social philosopher and philosopher of science in the field of science and technology studies. He is the Auguste Comte Chair in Social Epistemology at the University of Warwick. He served as the president of the British Science Association's sociology division from 2008 to 2009. He has published in the areas of social epistemology, academic freedom, and in support of intelligent design and transhumanism.

== Early life and education ==
Fuller was born on July 12, 1959, in New York City. He attended Regis High School in Manhattan. After high school, Fuller graduated from Columbia University with a Bachelor of Arts, summa cum laude, in history and sociology in 1979. As an undergraduate at Columbia College, he was a John Jay Scholar.

After graduation, Fuller was awarded a Kellett Fellowship to complete graduate studies in England at the University of Cambridge, where he earned an M.Phil. in the history of science and philosophy of science in 1981. He then earned his Ph.D. from the University of Pittsburgh in the history and philosophy of science in 1985. His doctoral dissertation, "Bounded Rationality in Law and Science", explored the implications of the views of Herbert A. Simon for political theory and philosophy of science.

== Career ==
Fuller held assistant and associate professorships at the University of Colorado at Boulder, Virginia Tech and the University of Pittsburgh. In 1994, he was appointed to the chair in sociology and social policy at the University of Durham, England. He moved in 1999 to the University of Warwick, England. In July 2007 Fuller was awarded a D. Litt. by Warwick in recognition of "published work or papers which demonstrate a high standard of important original work forming a major contribution to a subject". In 2008, Fuller served as President of the Sociology section of the British Association for the Advancement of Science. In that capacity, he staged a play, "Lincoln and Darwin—Live for One Night Only!", at the BA's annual Festival of Science in Liverpool. The play was later produced as a podcast in Australia.

Fuller has been a visiting professor in Denmark, Germany, Israel, Japan, Netherlands, Norway, Sweden (where he held a Fulbright Professorship in 1995 at Gothenburg University), and the United States (UCLA).

In 2010, Fuller became a Senior Fellow at the Center for the Study of Interdisciplinarity at the University of North Texas. In 2011, the University of Warwick appointed him to the Auguste Comte Chair in Social Epistemology. In 2011, Fuller was appointed a Fellow of the UK Academy of Social Sciences. In 2012, he was appointed to an Honorary Professorship at Dalian University of Technology, China. In 2012, he was made a member of the European Academy of Sciences and Arts in Division I (Humanities).

== Work ==
Fuller is most closely associated with social epistemology as an interdisciplinary research program. Social epistemology is a normative discipline that addresses philosophical problems of knowledge using the tools of history and the social sciences. Fuller founded the first journal (1987) and wrote the first book (1988) devoted to this topic. The most obvious feature of Fuller's approach, already present in his 1988 book, is that he rejects out of hand the Cartesian problem of skepticism.

Along with 21 books, Fuller has written 65 book chapters, 155 academic articles and many minor pieces. He has given many distinguished lectures and plenary addresses, and has presented to academic and non-academic audiences throughout the world, including over 100 media interviews. His works have been translated into fifteen languages. 23 academic symposia have been published on his work. He moved to the United Kingdom in 1994, the year he organized a conference in Durham on "Science's Social Standing".

Since moving to the UK, Fuller has increasingly oriented himself towards public intellectual expression, including television, radio and internet, which he interprets as a natural outgrowth of his version of social epistemology. Two of his books have been recognized in this regard. Kuhn vs. Popper was Book of the Month for February 2005 in the US mass circulation magazine, Popular Science. However, Rupert Read wrote: "I did not have to read far into this book in order to conclude that it is worthless. ... In sum: this book offers only a cartoon opposition of a fake 'Popper' to a fake 'Kuhn.'" Fuller responded, coining the word "Kuhnenstein" (Kuhn + Wittgenstein) to capture Read's view of Kuhn, which Fuller calls a "figment of Read's – and other's – fertile imagination." The Intellectual was selected as a Book of the Year in 2005 by the UK left-wing magazine, New Statesman. He periodically contributes a column to the Project Syndicate, associated with George Soros' Open Society project, which appears in several languages in newspapers across the world. In 2006 he also taught a course on the epistemology of journalism at an international summer school at the University of Lund, Sweden.

=== Academic freedom ===
Fuller believes (modeled on what he takes to be the German model) that academic freedom is a freedom reserved for academics, not a special case of freedom of speech. This includes the right to "cause reasoned offence", if within the terms of reason and evidence appropriate to the academic profession. He believes it important for academics to be able to express intellectual opinions for further debate which can result in progress. He also argues that students are equally entitled to academic freedom.

=== Intelligent design ===
Fuller has made many statements about his support for the teaching of intelligent design (ID) and authored two books on the subject. In 2005, in the case of Kitzmiller v. Dover Area School District, he testified on behalf of a local school system in the United States that required the teaching of intelligent design. The decision of the U.S. District Court held that intelligent design was a form of creationism and that its inclusion in the curriculum violated the U.S. Constitution's prohibition on the establishment of religion. The decision repeatedly cited Fuller's testimony to undermine the school system's position. Some of Fuller's critics within the Science and Technology Studies community described his participation in the trial as "naïve" and suggested that the field needs further development before it can constructively engage the legal community on the nature of science.

Fuller has said that he does not support intelligent design "but feels that it should have a 'fair run for its money'". In his book Dissent over Descent, he says he sees religion in general as a motivating influence in scientific pursuits and believes that the difference between science and religion is more institutional than intellectual. Critics have called his views on science postmodernist, though others characterize them as more closely related to social constructionism.

On February 21, 2007, Fuller debated Lewis Wolpert at Royal Holloway, University of London on whether evolution and intelligent design should be accorded equal status as scientific theories. Fuller supported the proposition. Fuller endorsed a work in support of intelligent design, the Discovery Institute's textbook Explore Evolution: The Arguments For and Against Neo-Darwinism (2007).

Appearing in the 2008 documentary-style propaganda film Expelled: No Intelligence Allowed, Fuller claimed that "abortion and euthanasia" are natural consequences of the acceptance of evolution by natural selection. He also believes that religious belief has furthered the development of science.

=== Transhumanism ===
Much of his work focuses on questions around technological enhancements and how they can improve the capacities of human beings. Fuller argues that the pursuit for enhancements is based on a need ″to create some distance between ourselves and the other animals.″ For Fuller, transhumanism offers humanity the prospect "to re-engineer the human body to enable us to live longer so as to work and play harder."

He featured in the 2016 documentary The Future of Work and Death.

== Principal works ==
=== Science Vs Religion? ===
In 2007, Fuller wrote Science Vs Religion?: Intelligent Design and the Problem of Evolution. In addition to introduction and conclusion chapters, it has chapters on the history of the relationship between religion and science, the thesis that modern science has its basis in an attempt by humanity to transcend itself and reach God, how Fuller believes complexity distinguishes ID from "other versions of creationism", legal issues, and the future of "Darwinism".

Professor of mathematics at Rutgers University Norman Levitt, in a review, described it as "a truly miserable piece of work, crammed with errors scientific, historical, and even theological". Levitt took issue with the following points:

- Fuller's acceptance at face value of William Dembski's claims on complexity and randomness, and his failure to come to grips with the wealth of results that this field has generated and with the trenchant criticism of Dembski's claims (or even to describe these claims accurately);
- Fuller's disparagement of evolutionary biology, without doing "serious analysis of the working methods and logical structure of biology itself" on which to base it;
- Fuller's misrepresentation of Isaac Newton's religious beliefs in order to make a point that is in fact antithetical to Newton's views;

Levitt infers that Fuller's views arise from an "animosity to science as such and to its cognitive authority [that] still pervades academic life outside the dominion of the science faculty". Fuller later responded to these points, accusing Levitt of axe-grinding and questioning his understanding of the book, which Fuller claimed was less a defense of contemporary intelligent design theory than a demonstration of its rootedness in the history of science. Fuller also claims that Levitt misquotes one of the three passages Levitt cites from the book, making it mean the opposite of the original. Levitt subsequently responded at length to Fuller, concluding that "Fuller's misreading of the politics that generated and sustains the ID movement is so complete as to constitute a peculiar pathology all its own." Fuller has long been highly critical of the views of science of his opponents in the Science Wars, including Levitt, dating back at least to 1994.

Sahotra Sarkar, a philosophy professor and integrative biologist at the University of Texas at Austin also criticized Fuller's book for presenting an "analysis of the intellectual disputes over contemporary ID creationism [that] is almost vacuous". Sarkar further states that the book has an idiosyncratic interpretation of the history of philosophy, including of Kant, and of logical positivism; having a limited grasp of the history of science, including making claims about Newton, Cuvier, Agassiz, Lamarck, Mendel, Pearson and Galton that are not supported by their writings; failure to engage the "debate over naturalism that ID creationism has generated" with "remarks on supernaturalism [that show] him to be equally non-cognizant of the work of ... Philip Johnson"; and other scientific errors.

=== Dissent Over Descent ===
In 2008, Fuller's book on the intelligent design controversy, Dissent Over Descent: Intelligent Design's Challenge to Darwinism was published. Steven Poole of The Guardian wrote: "book is an epoch-hopping parade of straw men, incompetent reasoning and outright gibberish, as when evolution is argued to share with astrology a commitment to "action at a distance", except that the distance is in time rather than space. It's intellectual quackery like this that gives philosophy of science a bad name."

Michael Ruse, Philosopher of Science at Florida State University wrote in the journal Science that Fuller's book "is completely wrong and is backed by no sound scholarship whatsoever. In at least one case, Fuller makes his case by an egregious misreading—of something I wrote about the role of genetic drift in Sewall Wright's shifting balance theory. For the record, Charles Darwin set out to provide a cause, what he called—following his mentors like William Whewell (who in turn referred back to Newton)—a true cause or vera causa. Darwin felt, and historians and philosophers of science as well as practicing evolutionary biologists still feel, that he succeeded…" In a "book of the week" review by retired Divinity Professor Keith Ward in the Times Higher Education Supplement, the book was praised for providing often overlooked information and provocative interpretations, but was criticized for a number of inaccuracies and misrepresentations.

A. C. Grayling, in New Humanist, wrote that the book contains a "mark of ignorance and historical short-sightedness on Fuller's part". In response, Fuller wrote an online response saying "if Grayling's grasp of the history of science went beyond head-banging standards, he would realize that our current level of scientific achievement would never have been reached, and more importantly that we would not be striving to achieve more, had chance-based explanations dominated over the design-based ones in our thinking about reality." To which Grayling wrote: "Steve Fuller complains, as do all authors whose books are panned, that I did not read his book properly (or at all)." He continued, "I'll take on Fuller any day regarding the history and theology of the various versions of Christianity with which humanity has been burdened. […] The same applies to the history of science."

== Selected bibliography ==
=== Books ===
- Fuller, Steve (2002) [1988]. Social epistemology (2nd ed.). Bloomington: Indiana University Press. ISBN 9780253215154.
- Fuller, Steve; Woolgar, Steve; de Mey, Marc; Shinn, Terry (1989). The cognitive turn: sociological and psychological perspectives on science. Dordrecht, Netherlands: Springer. ISBN 9789401578257.
- Fuller, Steve (1993) [1989]. Philosophy of science and its discontents (2nd ed.). New York: Guilford Press. ISBN 9780898620207.
- Fuller, Steve; Collier, James H. (2004) [1993]. Philosophy, rhetoric, and the end of knowledge a new beginning for science and technology studies (2nd ed.). Mahwah, New Jersey: Lawrence Erlbaum Associates. ISBN 9780805847680.
- Fuller, Steve (1997). Science. Concepts in Social Sciences. Milton Keynes, UK / Minneapolis US: Open University Press / University of Minnesota Press. ISBN 9780335198481.
- Fuller, Steve (2000). The governance of science: ideology and the future of the open society. Issues in society. Buckingham Philadelphia: Open University Press. ISBN 9780335202348.
- Fuller, Steve (2000). Thomas Kuhn: a philosophical history for our times. Chicago: University of Chicago Press. ISBN 9780226268965.
- Fuller, Steve (2002). Knowledge management foundations. Hartland Four Corners, Vermont Boston: KMCI Press Butterworth-Heinemann. ISBN 9780750673655.
- Fuller, Steve (2004). Kuhn vs. Popper: the struggle for the soul of science. Thriplow, UK / New York, US: Icon Books / Columbia University Press. ISBN 9780231134286
- Fuller, Steve (2005). The intellectual. Thriplow, UK: Icon Books. ISBN 9781840467215.
- Fuller, Steve (2006). The philosophy of science and technology studies. New York: Routledge. ISBN 9780415941051.
- Fuller, Steve (2006). The new sociological imagination. London Thousand Oaks, California: SAGE. ISBN 9780761947578.
- Fuller, Steve (2007). The knowledge book key concepts in philosophy, science, and culture. Stocksfield England / Canada: Acumen / McGill-Queens University Press. ISBN 9781844650989.
- Fuller, Steve (2007). New frontiers in science and technology. Cambridge, UK Malden, Massachusetts: Polity. ISBN 9780745636948.
- Fuller, Steve (2007). Science vs. religion?: intelligent design and the problem of evolution. Cambridge: Polity. ISBN 9780745641225.
- Fuller, Steve (2008). Dissent over descent: intelligent design's challenge to Darwinism. Thriplow, Cambridgeshire: Icon. ISBN 9781840468045.
- Fuller, Steve (2009). The sociology of intellectual life: the career of the mind in and around the academy. Los Angeles London: SAGE. ISBN 9781412928380.
- Fuller, Steve (2010). Science. The art of living. Durham U.K: Acumen. ISBN 9781844652044.
- Fuller, Steve (2011). Humanity 2.0: what it means to be human past, present and future. Houndmills, Basingstoke, Hampshire New York: Palgrave Macmillan. ISBN 9780230233430.
- Fuller, Steve (2013). Preparing for life in humanity 2.0. Basingstoke: Palgrave Macmillan. ISBN 9781137277060.
- Fuller, Steve; Lipinska, Veronika (2014). The proactionary imperative: a foundation for transhumanism. Basingstoke, UK New York: Palgrave Macmillan. ISBN 9781137433091.
- Fuller, Steve (2015). Knowledge: the philosophical quest in history. London New York: Routledge. ISBN 9781844658183.
- Fuller, Steve (2016). The Academic Caesar: University Leadership is Hard. Los Angeles London: SAGE. ISBN 9781473961784.
- Fuller, Steve (2018). Post-Truth: Knowledge as a Power Game. London: Anthem Press. ISBN 9781783086931.
- Fuller, Steve (2019). Nietzschean Meditations: Untimely Thoughts at the Dawn of the Transhuman Era. Basel, Switzerland: Schwabe Verlag. ISBN 9783796539466.
- Fuller, Steve (2020). A Player's Guide to the Post-Truth Condition: The Name of the Game. London: Anthem Press. ISBN 9781785276057.
- Fuller, Steve (2023). Back to the University's Future: The Second Coming of Humboldt. Berlin: Springer. ISBN 9783031363269.

=== Chapters in books ===
- Fuller, Steve (1992). "Social epistemology and the research agenda of science studies". In Pickering, Andrew (ed.). Science as practice and culture. Chicago: University of Chicago Press. pp. 390–428. ISBN 9780226668017.
- Fuller, Steve (1996). "Does science put an end to history, or history to science? Or, why being pro-science is harder than you think". In Ross, Andrew (ed.). Science wars. Durham, North Carolina: Duke University Press. pp. 29–60. ISBN 9780822318712.

=== Journal articles ===
- Fuller, Steve (November 1990). "They shoot dead horses, don't they?: Philosophical fear and sociological loathing in St Louis". Social Studies of Science. 20 (4): 664–681. doi:10.1177/030631290020004005. S2CID 146531717.
- Fuller, Steve (2005). "Kuhnenstein: or, the importance of being read". Philosophy of the Social Sciences. 35 (4): 480–498. doi:10.1177/0048393105280868. S2CID 54546035.
- Fuller, Steve; Haworth, Alan (2007). "Academic freedom". The Philosophers' Magazine. 38 (2): 72–77. doi:10.5840/tpm20073864. Debating the "statement of academic freedom" made by Academics for Academic Freedom (AFAF).
