= Explore Evolution =

- Cover
- Authors: Stephen C. Meyer, Scott Minnich, Jonathan Moneymaker, Paul A. Nelson, Ralph Seelke
- Language: English
- Subject: Evolution
- Publisher: Hill House Publishers Pty. Ltd. (Melbourne and London)
- Publication date: 2007
- Publication place: United States
- Media type: Print (Hardcover)
- Pages: 160
- ISBN: 0-947352-47-3
- OCLC: 170885225

Explore Evolution: The Arguments For and Against Neo-Darwinism is a controversial biology textbook written by a group of intelligent design supporters and published in 2007. Its promoters describe it as aimed at helping educators and students to discuss "the controversial aspects of evolutionary theory that are discussed openly in scientific books and journals but which are not widely reported in textbooks." As one of the Discovery Institute intelligent design campaigns to "teach the controversy" its evident purpose is to provide a "lawsuit-proof" way of attacking evolution and promoting pseudoscientific creationism without being explicit.

The book is co-authored by three Discovery Institute members, Stephen C. Meyer, Scott Minnich and Paul A. Nelson, as well as illustrator and creationist author Jonathan Moneymaker and Kansas evolution hearings participant Ralph Seelke. Hill House Publishers Pty. Ltd. ( Melbourne and London), headed by creationist and entomological taxonomist Bernard d'Abrera, is the publisher of Explore Evolution.

Nick Matzke of the National Center for Science Education suggests that the name Explore Evolution might have been chosen with the intention of creating confusion. For example, Explore Evolution is also the name of a National Science Foundation grant program for museums in the United States launched in June, 2003.

This book replaces Of Pandas and People, the supplementary textbook previously intended to introduce intelligent design to high school students. Discovery Institute fellows William A. Dembski and Jonathan Wells rewrote Of Pandas and People as a new 360-page college textbook called The Design of Life.

== Promotion ==
The Discovery Institute promotes Explore Evolution as an alternative approach to mainstream teaching evolution to high school biology students:

"Sadly, the majority of biology textbooks in use today are ‘dumbed-down’ and do a poor job explaining evolution," said Dr. John West of Discovery Institute, the book’s United States distributor. "Explore Evolution will improve the teaching of evolution by providing teachers and students with more information about evolution than they are likely to find in any other textbook written at the same level."

The Discovery Institute claims that the book Explore Evolution encourages critical thinking – a claim challenged by the National Centre for Science Education:

Explore Evolution promotes inquiry-based learning, encouraging students to participate in the process of discovery, deliberation, and argument that scientists use to form their theories.

Explore Evolution brings to the classroom data and debates that already are raised regularly by scientists in their science journals," emphasized science education policy analyst Casey Luskin, M.S., J.D. “Exposure to these real-world scientific debates will make the study of evolution more interesting to students, and it will train them to be better scientists by encouraging them to actually practice the kind of critical thinking and analysis that forms the heart of science.

The Discovery Institute states that the textbook was "peer-reviewed" and claim that it was written by authors with impeccable credentials. This claim is refuted by the National Centre for Science Education, and the integrity of the peers is called into question:

Co-authored by two state university biology professors, two philosophers of science, and a science curriculum writer, Explore Evolution was peer-reviewed by biology faculty at both state and private universities, teachers with experience in both AP and pre-AP life science courses, and doctoral scientists working for industry and government. The textbook has been pilot-tested in classes at both the secondary school and college levels.

The Master of Arts Program in Science and Religion and the Department of Education of Los Angeles' evangelical Christian Biola University (formerly the Bible Institute of Los Angeles) presented a conference entitled Science Teacher Symposium – Teaching Biological Origins on August 3 and 4 of 2007. A major thrust of this conference was to introduce and promote Explore Evolution as a textbook to teachers and others.

Several public school and college courses used drafts of Explore Evolution in courses before its official publication date. There are plans to use Explore Evolution in a public school in Tacoma, Washington.

In late 2009 the UK based creationist group "Truth in Science" sent out copies of the book to UK school librarians claiming that it was suitable for the UK science curriculum. In response the British Centre for Science Education published an open letter to UK school librarians together with a leaflet called "Explore Evolution Exposed" that was based on the NCSE analysis and adapted for the UK.

== Reaction ==
Science writer Sally Lehrman wrote an editorial in The Boston Globe on August 9, 2007 in which she stated that Explore Evolution "claims to teach students critical thinking but instead uses pseudoscience to attack Darwin's theories." Discovery Institute fellow Stephen C. Meyer objected in a letter to the editor of The Boston Globe, which was published on August 16, 2007.

University of Minnesota faculty member PZ Myers wrote a preliminary review after examining a copy of Explore Evolution. Myers had a negative impression of the book. Myers wrote,

In general, the book presents the subjects superficially, cherry picks examples, and sets up shallow hypotheses that bear little resemblance to what scientists actually think about the subject, and then shoots down the examples in such a way as to cast doubt on entire disciplines. It's a dirty, dishonest book in a slick package. It's gonna sell like hotcakes to every lazy, stupid teacher who wants to substitute vacuous crap for an honest and serious examination of a difficult and important subject.

Myers feels that, "The biology part is shallow, useless, and often wrong, and the critiques are basically just warmed over creationist arguments." Myers also points out that Explore Evolution is only 150 pages which compares unfavorably with the 1,146 pages of Kenneth Miller and Joseph S. Levine's popular high school textbook, Biology: The Living Science.

National Center for Science Education Public Information Project Director Nick Matzke suggests that Explore Evolution is a major signal at the vanguard of the fourth stage of the creationism–evolution controversy:

- Round 1: Fundamentalists ban evolution (1920s-1960s). Epperson v. Arkansas (1968) concluded this round.
- Round 2: "Creation science", which was invented in 1969, and ended as a serious legal strategy by Edwards v. Aguillard (1987), although there were earlier defeats such as Hendren v. Campbell (1977) and McLean v. Arkansas (1982).
- Round 3: Intelligent design, invented about 1987, ended as a serious legal strategy by Kitzmiller v. Dover (2005).
- Round 4: Attack evolution and imply creationism and/or intelligent design without making explicit statements. This is the strategy used in Explore Evolution in 2007.

That the book's strategy has been formulated in an attempt to avoid repeating previous court defeats is acknowledged by the Discovery Institute:

State school boards in Pennsylvania, South Carolina, New Mexico, and Minnesota along with local boards in Wisconsin and Louisiana have adopted science standards that encourage critical analysis of Darwinian Theory. To date, not a single lawsuit has challenged such standards.

This is consistent with the Discovery Institute intelligent design campaigns, "Stand up for science" and "Critical Analysis of Evolution". Matzke also notes that there is little that is new in the book or its associated teaching materials.

John Calvert, managing director of IDnet, believes that although Explore Evolution is "enormously important" for the creationist movement, he is skeptical about its chances for success. Since 2005, IDnet has tried to bring what they call "critical analysis of evolution" into the classroom. However, a setback in Kansas in February 2007 to change science standards in the wake of the Kitzmiller v. Dover decision left Calvert pessimistic.

John Timmer of technology site Ars Technica also reviewed the book, writing that its version of inquiry-based learning (IBL) "assiduously avoids suggesting that any conclusion can be reached at all", and as such it "makes a mockery of the use of IBL in the sciences", making the analogy that teaching gravity in this manner would lead students to the conclusion that "the force of gravity is random or unmeasurable". He also summarises the book's use of classic creationist arguments, noting that the book maintains "plausible deniability" by not explicitly mentioning either creationism or intelligent design. He also criticises the book for "logical inconsistencies" in its argument and its "divide and conquer" approach to the lines of evidence for evolution, particularly the idea "that the fact that any one of them supports evolution was just a lucky fluke". Ultimately he surmised that the book "doesn't only promote stupidity, it demands it" and "will leave their students with a picture of modern biology that is essentially unrelated to the way that science is actually practiced".
