= Kuhn vs. Popper =

2003 book by Steve Fuller

Kuhn vs. Popper: The Struggle for the Soul of Science (Revolutions in Science)
- Author: Steve Fuller
- Language: English
- Series: Revolutions in Science
- Subjects: Thomas Kuhn, Karl Popper
- Publisher: Columbia University Press
- Publication date: 2003
- Publication place: United States
- Media type: Print (Hardcover and Paperback)
- Pages: 160
- ISBN: 978-0231134286

Kuhn vs. Popper: The Struggle for the Soul of Science is a 2003 book by the sociologist Steve Fuller, in which the author discusses and criticizes the philosophers of science Thomas Kuhn and Karl Popper. The book was published by Columbia University Press.

== Summary ==
Fuller uses the 1965 meeting between the philosophers Thomas Kuhn and Karl Popper, in which they discussed the philosophy of science, as a point of departure to discuss how their respective philosophies have been received by the media, the public, and scholars.

== Reception ==
Kirkus Reviews called it a "succinct yet in-depth inquiry into a significant philosophical issue". In the "Journal of Critical Realism" the book was defined as "smart, engaging and well written but also (...) skates along the surface of the subject matter". The Journal "Nuncius" said that the book's aim "...is to invite readers to a critical examination of the wide ranging sociological and cultural implication of ideas, with particular emphasis on their consequences in time".

The philosopher Rupert Read called the book worthless, and wrote that it presented an over-simplified and distorted view of both Popper and Kuhn. The Economist wrote that the book was not thorough enough to be convincing.

The mass circulation US magazine Popular Science made the book 'Book of the Month' in February 2005.

== Reviews ==
- Choice July–August 2005 volume 42 i11-12 p1999
- Kirkus Reviews November 15, 2004, volume 72, issue 22, p1078
- New Scientist September 6, 2003, volume 179, issue 2411, page 48
- Philosophy of the Social Sciences, Rupert Read Sept 2005 v35 i3 p369-387
- Popular Science February 1, 2005, volume 266, issue 2, page 89
- The Economist (US) August 9, 2003, volume 368, i8336, page 71
