= Tilapia baloni =

Conservation status
- Least Concern (IUCN 3.1)

Scientific classification
- Kingdom: Animalia
- Phylum: Chordata
- Class: Actinopterygii
- Order: Cichliformes
- Family: Cichlidae
- Genus: Tilapia
- Species: T. baloni

Binomial name
- Tilapia baloni (Trewavas, Stewart 1975)

Species of fish

Tilapia baloni is a species of cichlid native to the Congo River basin of western Zambia. It is named after Polish-Canadian ichthyologist Eugene K. Balon.
