= Intelligent design movement =

Neo-creationist religious campaign

The intelligent design movement is a neo-creationist religious campaign for broad social, academic and political change to promote and support the pseudoscientific idea of intelligent design (ID), which asserts that "certain features of the universe and of living things are best explained by an intelligent cause, not an undirected process such as natural selection." Its chief activities are a campaign to promote public awareness of this concept, the lobbying of policymakers to include its teaching in high school science classes, and legal action, either to defend such teaching or to remove barriers otherwise preventing it. The movement arose out of the creation science movement in the United States, and is driven by a small group of proponents. The Encyclopædia Britannica explains that ID cannot be empirically tested and that it fails to solve the problem of evil; thus, it is neither sound science nor sound theology.

== Purpose ==
The overall goal of the intelligent design movement is to overthrow materialism and atheism. Its proponents believe that society has suffered "devastating" cultural consequences from adopting materialism and that science is the cause of the decay into materialism because it seeks only natural explanations, and is therefore atheistic. They believe that the scientific theory of evolution implies that humans have no spiritual nature, no moral purpose, and no intrinsic meaning. They seek to "reverse the stifling dominance of the materialist worldview", represented by the theory of evolution, in favor of "a science consonant with Christian and theistic convictions."

To achieve their goal of defeating a materialistic world view, advocates of intelligent design take a two-pronged approach. Alongside the promotion of intelligent design, proponents also seek to "Teach the Controversy"; discredit evolution by emphasizing perceived flaws in the theory of evolution, or disagreements within the scientific community and encourage teachers and students to explore non-scientific alternatives to evolution, or to critically analyze evolution and the controversy surrounding the teaching of evolution. But the world's largest general scientific society, the American Association for the Advancement of Science, has stated that "There is no significant controversy within the scientific community about the validity of evolution." and that "Evolution is one of the most robust and widely accepted principles of modern science." The ruling in the 2005 Dover Area School District trial; Kitzmiller v. Dover Area School District, where the claims of intelligent design proponents were considered by a United States federal court, stated that "evolution, including common descent and natural selection, is 'overwhelmingly accepted' by the scientific community."

The Discovery Institute (DI) is a religious think tank that drives the intelligent design movement. The Institute's Center for Science and Culture (CSC) counts most of the leading intelligent design advocates among its membership, most notably its former program advisor the now deceased Phillip E. Johnson. Johnson was the architect of the movement's key strategies, the wedge strategy and the "Teach the Controversy" campaign. The Discovery Institute and leading proponents represent intelligent design as a revolutionary scientific theory. The overwhelming majority of the scientific community, as represented by the American Association for the Advancement of Science, the National Academy of Sciences and nearly all scientific professional organizations, firmly reject these claims, and insist that intelligent design is not valid science, its proponents having failed to conduct an actual scientific research program. This has led the movement's critics to state that intelligent design is merely a public relations campaign and a political campaign.

According to critics of the intelligent design movement, the movement's purpose is political rather than scientific or educational. They claim the movement's "activities betray an aggressive, systematic agenda for promoting not only intelligent design creationism, but the religious worldview that undergirds it." Intelligent design is an attempt to recast religious dogma in an effort to reintroduce the teaching of biblical creationism to public school science classrooms; the intelligent design movement is an effort to reshape American society into a theocracy, primarily through education. As evidence, critics cite the Discovery Institute's political activities, its wedge strategy and statements made by leading intelligent design proponents. The scientific community's position, as represented by the National Academy of Sciences and the National Center for Science Education (NCSE), is that intelligent design is not science, but creationist pseudoscience. Richard Dawkins, a biologist and professor at Oxford University, compares the intelligent design movement's demand to "teach the controversy" with the demand to teach flat Earthism; acceptable in terms of history, but not in terms of science. "If you give the idea that there are two schools of thought within science--one that says the earth is round and one that says the earth is flat--you are misleading children."

== Philosophy ==
At the 1999 "Reclaiming America for Christ Conference" called by Reverend D. James Kennedy of Coral Ridge Ministries, Phillip E. Johnson gave a speech called "How The Evolution Debate Can Be Won." In it he sums up the theological and epistemological underpinnings of intelligent design and its strategy for victory:

To talk of a purposeful or guided evolution is not to talk about evolution at all. That is "slow creation." When you understand it that way, you realize that the Darwinian theory of evolution contradicts not just the book of Genesis, but every word in the Bible from beginning to end. It contradicts the idea that we are here because a Creator brought about our existence for a purpose. That is the first thing I realized, and it carries tremendous meaning.

I have built an intellectual movement in the universities and churches that we call "The Wedge," which is devoted to scholarship and writing that furthers this program of questioning the materialistic basis of science. One very famous book that's come out of The Wedge is biochemist Michael Behe's book Darwin's Black Box, which has had an enormous impact on the scientific world.

Now, the way that I see the logic of our movement going is like this. The first thing you understand is that the Darwinian theory isn't true. It's falsified by all of the evidence, and the logic is terrible. When you realize that, the next question that occurs to you is, "Well, where might you get truth?" When I preach from the Bible, as I often do at churches and on Sundays, I don't start with Genesis. I start with John 1:1, "In the beginning was the Word." In the beginning was intelligence, purpose, and wisdom. The Bible had that right and the materialist scientists are deluding themselves.

— Johnson, How The Evolution Debate Can Be Won

Darwin's Black Box, mentioned in the quote above, received harsh criticism from the scientific community, including negative reviews by evolutionary scientist Nathan Lents.

== History of the movement ==
The intelligent design movement grew out of a creationist tradition which argues against evolutionary theory from a religious standpoint, usually that of evangelical or fundamentalistic Christianity. Although intelligent design advocates often claim that they are arguing only for the existence of a designer who may or may not be God, all the movement's leading advocates believe that this designer is God. They frequently accompany their arguments with a discussion of religious issues, especially when addressing religious audiences, but elsewhere downplay the religious aspects of their agenda.

=== Origins ===
The modern use of the words "intelligent design," as a term intended to describe a field of inquiry, began after the Supreme Court of the United States, in the case of Edwards v. Aguillard (1987), ruled that creationism is unconstitutional in public school science curricula. A Discovery Institute report says that Charles Thaxton, editor of Of Pandas and People, had picked the phrase up from a NASA scientist, and thought "That's just what I need, it's a good engineering term." In drafts of the book over one hundred uses of the root word "creation," such as "creationism" and "creation science," were changed, almost without exception, to "intelligent design," while "creationists" was changed to "design proponents" or, in one instance, "cdesign proponentsists." [sic] In 1989, Of Pandas and People was published by the Foundation for Thought and Ethics (FTE), with the definition:

"Intelligent design means that various forms of life began abruptly through an intelligent agency, with their distinctive features already intact. Fish with fins and scales, birds with feathers, beaks, wings, etc."

Pandas was followed in 1991 by Darwin on Trial, a neo-creationist polemic by Phillip E. Johnson, that is regarded as a central text of the movement. Darwin on Trial mentioned Pandas as "'creationist' only in the sense that it juxtaposes a paradigm of 'intelligent design' with the dominant paradigm of (naturalistic) evolution," but his use of the term as a focus for his wedge strategy promoting "theistic realism" came later. The book was reviewed by evolutionary biologist Stephen Jay Gould for Scientific American in July 1992, concluding that the book contains "... no weighing of evidence, no careful reading of literature on all sides, no full citation of sources (the book does not even contain a bibliography) and occasional use of scientific literature only to score rhetorical points." Gould's review led to the formation in 1992 or 1993 of an 'Ad Hoc Origins Committee' of Johnson's supporters, which wrote a letter, circulated to thousands of university professors, defending the book. Among the 39 signatories were nine who later became members of the Center for the Renewal of Science and Culture (CRSC).

During the early 1990s Johnson worked to develop a 'big tent' movement to unify a wide range of creationist viewpoints in opposition to evolution. In 1992, the first formal meeting devoted to intelligent design was held in Southern Methodist University. It included a debate between Johnson and Michael Ruse (a key witness in McLean v. Arkansas (1982)) and papers by William A. Dembski, Michael Behe and Stephen C. Meyer. In 1993, Johnson organized a follow-up meeting, including Dembski, Behe, Meyer, Dean H. Kenyon (co-author of Pandas) and Walter Bradley (co-author with Thaxton and Kenyon of The Mystery of Life's Origin (1984)), as well as two graduate students, Paul A. Nelson and Jonathan Wells.

=== Center for the Renewal of Science and Culture ===
On December 6, 1993, an article by Meyer was published in The Wall Street Journal, drawing national attention to the controversy over Dean H. Kenyon's teaching of creationism. This article also gained the attention of Discovery Institute co-founder Bruce Chapman. On discovering that Meyer was developing the idea of starting a scientific research center in conversations with conservative political scientist John G. West, Chapman invited them to create a unit within the Discovery Institute called the Center for the Renewal of Science and Culture (later renamed the Center for Science and Culture). This center was dedicated to overthrowing "scientific materialism" and "fomenting nothing less than a scientific and cultural revolution." A 1995 conference, "The Death of Materialism and the Renewal of Culture," served as a blueprint for the center. By 1996 they had nearly a million dollars in grants, the largest being from Howard Ahmanson, Jr., with smaller but still large contributions coming from the Stewardship Foundation established by C. Davis Weyerhaeuser and the Maclellan Foundation, and appointed their first class of research fellows.

=== The wedge strategy ===
The wedge strategy was formulated by Phillip E. Johnson to combat the "evil" of methodological naturalism. It first came to the general public's attention when a Discovery Institute internal memo now known as the "Wedge Document" (believed to have been written in 1998) was leaked to the public in 1999. However it is believed to have been an update of an earlier document to be implemented between 1996 and 2001.

The document begins with "The proposition that human beings are created in the image of God is one of the bedrock principles on which Western civilization was built." and then goes on to outline the movement's goal to exploit perceived discrepancies within evolutionary theory in order to discredit evolution and scientific materialism in general. Much of the strategy is directed toward the broader public, as opposed to the professional scientific community. The stated "governing goals" of the CSC's wedge strategy are:

1. To defeat scientific materialism and its destructive moral, cultural and political legacies
2. To replace materialistic explanations with the theistic understanding that nature and human beings are created by God

Critics of intelligent design movement argue that the Wedge Document and strategy demonstrate that the intelligent design movement is motivated purely by religion and political ideology and that the Discovery Institute as a matter of policy obfuscates its agenda. The Discovery Institute's official response was to characterize the criticism and concern as "irrelevant," "paranoid," and "near-panic" while portraying the Wedge Document as a "fund-raising document."

Johnson in his 1997 book Defeating Darwinism by Opening Minds confirmed some of the concerns voiced by the movement's gainsayers:

If we understand our own times, we will know that we should affirm the reality of God by challenging the domination of materialism and naturalism in the world of the mind. With the assistance of many friends I have developed a strategy for doing this,...We call our strategy the "wedge."

=== Kansas evolution hearings ===
The Kansas evolution hearings were a series of hearings held in Topeka, Kansas, from May 5 to May 12, 2005, by the Kansas State Board of Education and its State Board Science Hearing Committee to change how evolution and the origin of life would be taught in the state's public high school science classes. The hearings were arranged by the conservative Board with the intent of introducing intelligent design into science classes via the "Teach the Controversy" method.

The hearings raised the issues of creation and evolution in public education and were attended by all the major participants in the intelligent design movement but were ultimately boycotted by the scientific community over concern of lending credibility to the claim, made by proponents of intelligent design, that evolution is purportedly the subject of wide dispute within the scientific and science education communities.

The Discovery Institute, hub of the intelligent design movement, played a central role in starting the hearings by promoting its Critical Analysis of Evolution lesson plan which the Kansas State Board of Education eventually adopted over objections of the State Board Science Hearing Committee, and campaigning on behalf of conservative Republican candidates for the Board.

Local science advocacy group Kansas Citizens for Science organized a boycott of the hearings by mainstream scientists, who accused it of being a kangaroo court and argued that their participation would lend an undeserved air of legitimacy to the hearings. Board member Kathy Martin declared at the beginning of the hearings "Evolution has been proven false. ID (Intelligent Design) is science-based and strong in facts." At their conclusion she proclaimed that evolution is "an unproven, often disproven" theory.

"ID has theological implications. ID is not strictly Christian, but it is theistic," asserted Martin. The scientific community rejects teaching intelligent design as science; a leading example being the National Academy of Sciences, which issued a policy statement saying "Creationism, intelligent design, and other claims of supernatural intervention in the origin of life or of species are not science because they are not testable by the methods of science."

On February 13, 2007, the Board voted 6 to 4 to reject the amended science standards enacted in 2005.

=== Kitzmiller v. Dover Area School District (2005) ===
In the movement's sole major case, Kitzmiller v. Dover Area School District, it was represented by the Thomas More Law Center, which had been seeking a test-case on the issue for at least five years. However conflicting agendas resulted in the withdrawal of a number of Discovery Institute Fellows as expert witnesses, at the request of DI director Bruce Chapman, and mutual recriminations with the DI after the case was lost. The Alliance Defense Fund briefly represented the Foundation for Thought and Ethics in its unsuccessful motion to intervene in this case, and prepared amicus curiae briefs on behalf of the DI and FTE in it. It has also made amicus curiae submissions and offered to pay for litigation, in other (actual and potential) creationism-related cases. On a far smaller scale, Larry Caldwell and his wife operate under the name Quality Science Education for All, and have made a number of lawsuits in furtherance of the movement's anti-evolution agenda. In 2005 they brought at least three separate lawsuits to further the intelligent design movement's agenda. One was later abandoned, two were dismissed.

== Reception by the public ==
An August 2005 poll from The Pew Forum on Religion & Public Life showed 64% of Americans favoring the teaching of creationism along with evolution in science classrooms, though only 38% favored teaching it instead of evolution, with the results varying deeply by education level and religiosity. The poll showed the educated were far less attached to intelligent design than the less educated. Evangelicals and fundamentalists showed high rates of affiliation with intelligent design while other religious persons and the secular were much lower.

== Reception by the scientific community ==
Jason Rosenhouse summarized the prevailing attitude of the scientific community: "Scientists who have responded to ID arguments in print have generally done so with a tone of sneering contempt. This is understandable: ID supporters present fallacious arguments, use dishonest rhetoric, and often present non-contemptuous responses as evidence that their theories are gaining acceptance."

Intelligent design advocates realize that their arguments have little chance of acceptance within the mainstream scientific community, so they direct them toward politicians, philosophers and the general public. What prima facie "scientific" material they have produced has been attacked by critics as containing factual misrepresentation and misleading, rhetorical and equivocal terminology. A number of documentaries that promote their assertion that intelligent design as an increasingly well-supported line of scientific inquiry have been made for the Discovery Institute. The bulk of the material produced by the intelligent design movement, however, is not intended to be scientific but rather to promote its social and political aims. Polls indicate that intelligent design's main appeal to citizens comes from its link to religious concepts.

Scientists responding to a poll overwhelmingly said intelligent design is about religion, not science. A 2002 sampling of 460 Ohio science professors had 91% say it's primarily religion, 93% say there is not "any scientifically valid evidence or an alternate scientific theory that challenges the fundamental principles of the theory of evolution," and 97% say that they did not use intelligent design concepts in their own research.

In October and November 2001, the Discovery Institute advertised A Scientific Dissent From Darwinism in three national publications (The New York Review of Books, The New Republic and The Weekly Standard), listing what they claimed were "100 scientific dissenters" who had signed a statement that "We are skeptical of claims for the ability of random mutation and natural selection to account for the complexity of life. Careful examination of the evidence for Darwinian theory should be encouraged." Shortly afterwards the National Center for Science Education described the wording as misleading, noting that a minority of the signatories were biologists and some of the others were engineers, mathematicians and philosophers, and that some signatories did not fully support the Discovery Institute's claims. The list was further criticized in a February 2006 article in The New York Times which pointed out that only 25% of the signatories by then were biologists and that signatories' "doubts about evolution grew out of their religious beliefs." In 2003, as a humorous parody of such listings the NCSE produced the pro-evolution Project Steve list of signatories, all with variations of the name Steve and most of whom are trained biologists. As of July 31, 2006, the Discovery Institute lists "over 600 scientists," while Project Steve reported 749 signatories; as of May 30, 2014, 1,338 Steves have signed the statement, while 906 have signed A Scientific Dissent from Darwinism as of April 2014.

== Structure ==
=== The "big tent" strategy ===
The movement's strategy as set forth by Phillip E. Johnson states the replacement of "materialist science" with "theistic science" as its primary goal; and, more generally, for intelligent design to become "the dominant perspective in science" and to "permeate our religious, cultural, moral and political life." This agenda is now being actively pursued by the Center for Science and Culture, which plays the leading role in the promotion of intelligent design. Its fellows include most of the leading intelligent design advocates: William A. Dembski, Michael Behe, Jonathan Wells and Stephen C. Meyer.

Intelligent design has been described by its proponents as a 'big tent' belief, one in which all theists united by having some kind of creationist belief (but of differing opinions as regards details) can support. If successfully promoted, it would reinstate creationism in the teaching of science, after which debates regarding details could resume. In his 2002 article in Christian Research Journal, Discovery Institute fellow Paul A. Nelson credits Johnson for the 'big tent' approach and for reviving creationist debate since the Edwards v. Aguillard decision. According to Nelson, "The promise of the big tent of ID is to provide a setting where Christians (and others) may disagree amicably, and fruitfully, about how best to understand the natural world, as well as Scripture."

In his presentation to the 1999 "Reclaiming America for Christ Conference," "How The Evolution Debate Can Be Won," Johnson affirmed this 'big tent' role for "The Wedge" (without using the term intelligent design):

To talk of a purposeful or guided evolution is not to talk about evolution at all. That is "slow creation." When you understand it that way, you realize that the Darwinian theory of evolution contradicts not just the book of Genesis, but every word in the Bible from beginning to end. It contradicts the idea that we are here because a Creator brought about our existence for a purpose. That is the first thing I realized, and it carries tremendous meaning.

...

So did God create us? Or did we create God? That's an issue that unites people across the theistic world. Even religious, God-believing Jewish people will say, "That's an issue we really have a stake in, so let's debate that question first. Let us settle that question first. There are plenty of other important questions on which we may not agree, and we'll have a wonderful time discussing those questions after we've settled the first one. We will approach those questions in a better spirit because we have worked together for this important common end."

...

[The Wedge is] inherently an ecumenical movement. Michael Behe is a Roman Catholic. The next book that is coming out from Cambridge University Press by one of my close associates is by an evangelical convert to Greek Orthodoxy. We have a lot of Protestants, too. The point is that we have this broad-based intellectual movement that is enabling us to get a foothold in the scientific and academic journals and in the journals of the various religious faiths.

— Johnson, How The Evolution Debate Can Be Won

The Discovery Institute consistently denies allegations that its intelligent design agenda has religious foundations, and downplays the religious source of much of its funding. In an interview of Stephen C. Meyer when World News Tonight asked about the Discovery Institute's many evangelical Christian donors the Institute's public relations representative stopped the interview saying "I don't think we want to go down that path."

=== Obfuscation of religious motivation ===
Phillip E. Johnson, largely regarded as the leader of the movement, positions himself as a "theistic realist" against "methodological naturalism" and intelligent design as the method through which God created life. Johnson explicitly calls for intelligent design proponents to obfuscate their religious motivations so as to avoid having intelligent design recognized "as just another way of packaging the Christian evangelical message." Hence intelligent design arguments are carefully formulated in secular terms and intentionally avoid positing the identity of the designer. Johnson has stated that cultivating ambiguity by employing secular language in arguments which are carefully crafted to avoid overtones of theistic creationism is a necessary first step for ultimately introducing the Christian concept of God as the designer. Johnson emphasizes "the first thing that has to be done is to get the Bible out of the discussion" and that "after we have separated materialist prejudice from scientific fact" only then can "biblical issues" be discussed. In the foreword to Creation, Evolution, & Modern Science (2000) Johnson writes "The intelligent design movement starts with the recognition that 'In the beginning was the Word,' and 'In the beginning God created.' Establishing that point isn't enough, but it is absolutely essential to the rest of the gospel message."

=== Organizations ===
==== The Center for Science and Culture ====
The Center for Science and Culture, formerly known as the Center for the Renewal of Science and Culture, is a division of the Discovery Institute. The Center consists of a tightly knit core of people who have worked together for almost a decade to advance intelligent design as both a concept and a movement as necessary adjuncts of its wedge strategy policy. This cadre includes Phillip E. Johnson, Michael Behe, William A. Dembski and Stephen C. Meyer. They are united by a religious vision which, although it varies among the members in its particulars and is seldom acknowledged outside of the Christian press, is predicated on the shared conviction that America is in need of "renewal" which can be accomplished only by unseating "Godless" materialism and instituting religion as its cultural foundation.

In his keynote address at the "Research and Progress in intelligent design" (RAPID) conference held in 2002 at Biola University, William A. Dembski described intelligent design's "dual role as a constructive scientific project and as a means for cultural renaissance." In a similar vein, the movement's hub, the Discovery Institute's Center for Science and Culture had until 2002 been the "Center for the Renewal of Science and Culture." Explaining the name change, a spokesperson for the CSC insisted that the old name was simply too long. However, the change followed accusations that the center's real interest was not science but reforming culture along lines favored by conservative Christians.

Critics of the movement cite the Wedge Document as confirmation of this criticism and assert that the movement's leaders, particularly Phillip E. Johnson, view the subject as a culture war: "Darwinian evolution is not primarily important as a scientific theory but as a culturally dominant creation story. ... When there is radical disagreement in a commonwealth about the creation story, the stage is set for intense conflict, the kind of conflict that is known as a 'culture war.'"

Recently the Center for Science and Culture has moderated its previous overtly theistic mission statements to appeal to a broader, more secular audience. It hopes to accomplish this by using less overtly theistic messages and language. Despite this, the Center for Science and Culture still states as a goal a redefinition of science, and the philosophy on which it is based, particularly the exclusion of what it calls the "unscientific principle of materialism," and in particular the acceptance of what it calls "the scientific theory of intelligent design."

Promotional materials from the Discovery Institute acknowledge that the Ahmanson family donated $1.5 million to the Center for Science and Culture, then known as the Center for the Renewal of Science and Culture, for a research and publicity program to "unseat not just Darwinism but also Darwinism's cultural legacy." Mr. Ahmanson funds many causes important to the Christian religious right, including Christian Reconstructionism, whose goal is to place the US "under the control of biblical law." Until 1995, Ahmanson sat on the board of the Christian Reconstructionist Chalcedon Foundation.

==== Other organizations ====
- The Access Research Network (ARN) has become a comprehensive clearinghouse for ID resources, including news releases, publications, multimedia products and an elementary school science curriculum. Its stated mission is "providing accessible information on science, technology and society issues from an intelligent design perspective." Its directors are Dennis Wagner and CSC Fellows Mark Hartwig, Stephen C. Meyer and Paul A. Nelson. Its 'Friends of ARN' is also dominated by CSC Fellows.
- The Foundation for Thought and Ethics (FTE) is a Christian non-profit organization based in Richardson, Texas, that publishes textbooks and articles promoting intelligent design, abstinence, and Christian nationism. CSC Fellows Charles Thaxton and William A. Dembski have served as academic editors for the Foundation. The FTE has close associations with the Discovery Institute, hub of the intelligent design movement and other religious Christian groups.
- The Intelligent Design and Evolution Awareness Center (IDEA Center) is a Christian nonprofit organization formed originally as a student club promoting intelligent design at the University of California, San Diego (UCSD). There are about 25 active chapters of the organization in the United States, Kenya, Canada, Ukraine, and the Philippines. There have been 35 active chapters formed and several others are currently pending. Six out of the listed 32 chapters in the United States are located at high schools. In December 2008, biologist Allen MacNeill stated, on the basis of analysis of the webpages of the national organization and local chapters, that it appeared that the organization is moribund.
- The Intelligent Design Network (IDnet) is a nonprofit organization formed in Kansas to promote intelligent design. It is based in Shawnee Mission, Kansas. The Intelligent Design Network was founded by John Calvert, a corporate finance lawyer with a bachelor's degree in geology and nutritionist William S. Harris. Together, Calvert and Harris have published the article in The National Catholic Bioethics Quarterly. Calvert also has written a play about intelligent design in a high school biology class with Daniel Schwabauer.

== Activism ==
The intelligent design movement primarily campaigns on two fronts: a public relations campaign meant to influence the popular media and sway public opinion; and an aggressive lobbying campaign to cultivate support for the teaching of intelligent design amongst policymakers and the wider educational community. Both these activities are largely funded and directed by the Discovery Institute, from national to grassroots levels. The movement's first goal is to establish an acceptance of intelligent design at the expense of evolution in public school science; its long-term goal is no less than the "renewal" of American culture through the shaping of public policy to reflect conservative Christian values. As the Discovery Institute states, intelligent design is central to this agenda: "Design theory promises to reverse the stifling dominance of the materialist worldview, and to replace it with a science consonant with Christian and theistic convictions."

The Discovery Institute has also relied on several polls to indicate the acceptance of intelligent design. A 2005 Harris poll identified ten percent of adults in the United States as taking what they called the intelligent design position, that "human beings are so complex that they required a powerful force or intelligent being to help create them." (64% agreed with the creationist view that "human beings were created directly by God" and 22% believed that "human beings evolved from earlier species." 49% accepted plant and animal evolution, while 45% did not.) Although some polls commissioned by the Discovery Institute show more support, these polls have been criticized as suffering from considerable flaws, such as having a low response rate (248 out of 16,000), being conducted on behalf of an organization with an expressed interest in the outcome of the poll, and containing leading questions.

Critics of intelligent design and its movement contend that intelligent design is a specific form of creationism, neo-creationism, a viewpoint rejected by intelligent design advocates. It was bolstered by the 2005 ruling in United States federal court that a public school district requirement for science classes to teach that intelligent design is an alternative to evolution was a violation of the Establishment Clause of the First Amendment to the United States Constitution. In Kitzmiller v. Dover Area School District, United States District Judge John E. Jones III also ruled that intelligent design is not science and is essentially religious in nature.

In pursuing the goal of establishing intelligent design at the expense of evolution in public school science, intelligent design groups have threatened and isolated high school science teachers, school board members and parents who opposed their efforts. Responding to the well-organized curricular challenges of intelligent design proponents to local school boards have been disruptive and divisive in the communities where they've taken place. The campaigns run by intelligent design groups place teachers in the difficult position of arguing against their employers while the legal challenges to local school districts are costly and divert scarce funds away from education into court battles. Although these court battles have almost invariably resulted in the defeat of intelligent design proponents, they are draining and divisive to local schools. For example, as a result of Kitzmiller v. Dover Area School District trial, the Dover Area School District was forced to pay $1,000,011 in legal fees and damages for pursuing a policy of teaching the controversy - presenting intelligent design as an allegedly scientific alternative to evolution.

Leading members of the intelligent design movement are also associated with denialism, both Phillip E. Johnson and Jonathan Wells have signed an AIDS denialism petition.

=== Campaigns ===
The Discovery Institute, through its Center for Science and Culture, has formulated a number of campaigns to promote intelligent design, while discrediting evolutionary biology, which the Institute terms "Darwinism."

Prominent Institute campaigns have been to "Teach the Controversy" and, more recently, to allow Critical Analysis of Evolution. Other prominent campaigns have claimed that intelligent design advocates (most notably Richard Sternberg) have been discriminated against, and thus that Academic Freedom bills are needed to protect academics' and teachers' ability to criticise evolution, and that there is a link from evolution to ideologies such as Nazism and eugenics. These three claims are all publicised in the pro-ID movie Expelled: No Intelligence Allowed (2008). Other campaigns have included petitions, most notably A Scientific Dissent From Darwinism.

The response of the scientific community has been to reiterate that the theory of evolution is overwhelmingly accepted as a matter of scientific consensus whereas intelligent design has been rejected by the overwhelming majority of the scientific community (see list of scientific societies explicitly rejecting intelligent design).

=== Politics and public education ===
The main battlefield for this culture war has been US regional and state school boards. Courts have also become involved as those campaigns to include intelligent design or weaken the teaching of evolution in public school science curricula are challenged on First Amendment grounds. In Kitzmiller v. Dover Area School District, the plaintiffs successfully argued that intelligent design is a form of creationism, and that the school board policy thus violated the Establishment Clause of the First Amendment.

Intelligent design is an integral part of a political campaign by cultural conservatives, largely from evangelical religious convictions, that seek to redefine science to suit their own ideological agenda. Though numerically a minority of Americans, the politics of intelligent design is based less on numbers than on intensive mobilization of ideologically committed followers and savvy public relations campaigns. Political repercussions from the culturally conservative sponsorship of the issue has been divisive and costly to the effected communities, polarizing and dividing not only those directly charged with educating young people but entire local communities.

With a doctrine that calls itself science among non-scientists but is rejected by the vast majority of the real practitioners, an amicable coexistence and collaboration between intelligent design advocates and upholders of mainstream science education standards is rare. With mainstream scientific and educational organizations saying the theory of evolution is not "in crisis" or a subject doubted by scientists, nor intelligent design the emergent scientific paradigm or rival theory its proponents proclaim, "teaching the controversy" is suitable for classes on politics, history, culture, or theology they say, but not science. By attempting to force the issue into science classrooms, intelligent design proponents create a charged environment that forces participants and bystanders alike to declare their positions, which has resulted in intelligent design groups threatening and isolating high school science teachers, school board members and parents who opposed their efforts.

In a round table discussion entitled "Science Wars: Should Schools Teach Intelligent Design?" at the American Enterprise Institute on 21 October 2005 and televised on C-SPAN, the Discovery Institute's Mark Ryland and the Thomas More Law Center's Richard Thompson had a frank disagreement, in which Ryland claimed the Discovery Institute has always cautioned against the teaching of intelligent design, and Thompson responded that the Institute's leadership had not only advocated the teaching of intelligent design, but encouraged others to do so, and that the Dover Area School District had merely followed the Institute's calls for action. As evidence, Thompson cited the Discovery Institute's guidebook Intelligent Design in Public School Science Curricula written by the Institute's co-founder and first director, Stephen C. Meyer, and David K. DeWolf, a CSC Fellow, which stated in its closing paragraphs: "Moreover, as the previous discussion demonstrates, school boards have the authority to permit, and even encourage, teaching about design theory as an alternative to Darwinian evolution -- and this includes the use of textbooks such as Of Pandas and People that present evidence for the theory of intelligent design."

=== Higher education ===
In 1999, William A. Dembski was invited by Baylor University president Robert B. Sloan to form the Michael Polanyi Center, described by Dembski as "the first Intelligent Design think tank at a research university." Its creation was controversial with Baylor faculty, and in 2000 it was merged with the Institute for Faith and Learning. Dembski, although remaining as a research professor until 2005, was given no courses to teach.

Two universities have offered courses in intelligent design: Oklahoma Baptist University, where ID advocate Michael Newton Keas taught 'Unified Studies: Introduction to Biology,' and Biola University, host of the Mere Creation conference. Additionally, numerous Christian evangelical institutions have faculty with interests in intelligent design. These include Oral Roberts University and Southwestern Baptist Theological Seminary. Patrick Henry College teaches creationism but also exposes its students to both Darwinian evolution and intelligent design.

In 2005, the American Association of University Professors issued a strongly worded statement asserting that the theory of evolution is nearly universally accepted in the community of scholars, and deploring requirements "to make students aware of an 'intelligent-design hypothesis' to account for the origins of life." It said that such requirements are "inimical to principles of academic freedom."

=== The Web ===
Much of the actual debate over intelligent design between intelligent design proponents and members of the scientific community has taken place on the Web, primarily blogs and message boards, instead of the scientific journals and symposia where traditionally much science is discussed and settled. In promoting intelligent design the actions of its proponents have been more like a political pressure group than like researchers entering an academic debate as described by movement critic Taner Edis. The movement lacks any verifiable scientific research program and concomitant debates in academic circles.

The Web continues to play a central role in the Discovery Institute's strategy of promotion of intelligent design and it adjunct campaigns. On September 6, 2006, on the Center's Evolution News & Views blog, Discovery Institute staffer Casey Luskin published a post entitled "Putting Wikipedia On Notice About Their Biased Anti-ID Intelligent Design Entries." In the post, Luskin reprinted a letter from a reader complaining that Wikipedia's coverage of ID to be "one sided" and that pro-intelligent design editors were censored and attacked. Along with the letter, Luskin published a Wikipedia email address for general information and urged readers "to contact Wikipedia to express your feelings about the biased nature of the entries on intelligent design."

=== International ===
Despite being primarily based in the United States, there have been efforts to introduce pro-intelligent design teaching material into educational facilities in other countries. In the United Kingdom, the group Truth in Science has used material from the Discovery Institute to create free teaching packs which have been mass-mailed to all UK schools. Shortly after this emerged, government ministers announced that they regarded intelligent design to be creationism and unsuitable for teaching in the classroom. They also announced that the teaching of the material in science classes was to be prohibited.

== Criticisms of the movement ==
One of the most common criticisms of the movement and its leadership is that of intellectual dishonesty, in the form of misleading impressions created by the use of rhetoric, intentional ambiguity, and misrepresented evidence. It is alleged that its goal is to lead an unwary public to reach certain conclusions, and that many have been deceived as a result. Critics of the movement, such as Eugenie Scott, Robert T. Pennock and Barbara Forrest, claim that leaders of the intelligent design movement, and the Discovery Institute in particular, knowingly misquote scientists and other experts, deceptively omit contextual text through ellipsis, and make unsupported amplifications of relationships and credentials. Theologian and molecular biophysicist Alister McGrath has a number of criticisms of the Intelligent design movement, stating that "those who adopt this approach make Christianity deeply... vulnerable to scientific progress" and defining it as just another "god-of-the-gaps" theory. He went on to criticize the movement on theological grounds as well, stating "It is not an approach I accept, either on scientific or theological grounds."

Such statements commonly note the institutional affiliations of signatories for purposes of identification. But this statement strategically listed either the institution that granted a signatory's PhD or the institutions with which the individual is presently affiliated. Thus the institutions listed for Raymond G. Bohlin, Fazale Rana, and Jonathan Wells, for example, were the University of Texas, Ohio University, and the University of California, Berkeley, respectively, where they earned their degrees, rather than their current affiliations: Probe Ministries for Bohlin, Reasons to Believe ministry for Rana, and the Discovery Institute's Center for Science and Culture for Wells. Similarly confusing lists of local scientists were circulated during controversies over evolution education in Georgia, New Mexico, Ohio, and Texas. In another instance, the Discovery Institute frequently mentions the Nobel Prize in connection with Henry F. Schaefer, III, a CSC Fellow, and chemist at the University of Georgia. Critics allege that Discovery Institute is inflating his reputation by constantly referring to him as a "five-time nominee for the Nobel Prize" because Nobel Prize nominations remain confidential for fifty years.

This criticism is not reserved only to the Institute; individual intelligent design proponents have been accused of using their own credentials and those of others in a misleading or confusing fashion. For example, critics allege William A. Dembski gratuitously invokes his laurels by boasting of his correspondence with a Nobel laureate, bragging that one of his books was published in a series whose editors include a Nobel laureate, and exulting that the publisher of the intelligent design book The Mystery of Life's Origin, Philosophical Library, also published books by eight Nobel laureates. Critics claim that Dembski purposefully omits relevant facts which he fails to mention to his audience that in 1986, during the Edwards v. Aguillard hearings, 72 Nobel laureates endorsed an amicus curiae brief that noted that the "evolutionary history of organisms has been as extensively tested and as thoroughly corroborated as any biological concept."

Another common criticism is that since no intelligent design research has been published in mainstream, peer-reviewed scientific journals, the Discovery Institute often misuses the work of mainstream scientists by putting out lists of articles that allegedly support their arguments for intelligent design drawing from mainstream scientific literature. Often, the original authors respond that their articles cited by the center don't support their arguments at all. Many times, the original authors have publicly refuted them for distorting the meaning of something they've written for their own purposes.

Sahotra Sarkar, a molecular biologist at the University of Texas, has testified that intelligent design advocates, and specifically the Discovery Institute, have misused his work by misrepresenting its conclusions to bolster their own claims, has gone on to allege that the extent of the misrepresentations rises to the level of professional malfeasance:

"When testifying before the Texas State Board of Education in 2003 (in a battle over textbook adoption that we won hands down), I claimed that my work had been maliciously misused by members of the Discovery Institute. ... The trouble is that it says nothing of the sort that Meyer claims. I don't mention Dembski, ID, or "intelligent" information whatever that may be. I don't talk about assembly instructions. In fact what the paper essentially does is question the value of informational notions altogether, which made many molecular biologists unhappy, but which is also diametrically opposed to the "complex specified information" project of the ID creationists. ... Notice how my work is being presented as being in concordance with ID when Meyer knows very well where I stand on this issue. If Meyer were an academic, this kind of malfeasance would rightly earn him professional censure. Unfortunately he's not. He's only the Director of the Discovery Institute's Center for Science and Culture."

— Sahotra Sarkar, Fraud from the Discovery Institute

An October 2005 conference called "When Christians and Cultures Clash" was held in Christ Hall at Evangelical School of Theology in Myerstown, Pennsylvania. Attorney Randall L. Wenger, who is affiliated with the Alliance Defense Fund, and a close ally of the Discovery Institute, and one of the presenters at the conference advocated the use of subterfuge for advancing the movement's religious goals: "But even with God's blessing, it's helpful to consult a lawyer before joining the battle... For instance, the Dover area school board might have had a better case for the intelligent design disclaimer they inserted into high school biology classes had they not mentioned a religious motivation at their meetings... Give us a call before you do something controversial like that... I think we need to do a better job at being clever as serpents."

Critics state about the wedge strategy that its "ultimate goal is to create a theocratic state". The Discovery Institute rejected the charge. Others have said that the charge is overstated, but accurate. Anyway, intelligent design seems to cross the boundary between church and state.

== Legacy ==
In 2017, theoretical physicist Mano Singham wrote that since the ruling of Kitzmiller v. Dover Area School District, "little" has been "heard from" the intelligent design movement, adding "Whereas before one heard of ID all over the place, now one has to seek them out by visiting the Discovery Institute which has become kind of a refuge for the last holdouts."

== See also ==
- Expelled: No Intelligence Allowed
- Intelligent Design and Evolution Awareness Center
- Intelligent design in politics
- Intelligent design network
- Kitzmiller v. Dover Area School District
- Wedge strategy
