= Intelligent Design and Evolution Awareness Center =

Nonprofit advocacy organization

The Intelligent Design and Evolution Awareness Center (IDEA Center) is a nonprofit advocacy organization that promotes intelligent design.

The center was formed in 2001; it grew out of a Christian student club that was formed at University of California, San Diego in May 1999 by Steve Renner, Eddie Colanter, and Casey Luskin after the "father" of the intelligent design movement Phillip E. Johnson lectured at UCSD. By 2008 it appeared to be moribund.

== See also ==
- A Scientific Support for Darwinism
- Creation–evolution controversy
- National Center for Science Education
- Project Steve
