= Environmental Biology of Fishes =

- Discipline: Ichthyology
- Language: English
- Edited by: Margaret F. Docker

Publication details
- History: 1976–present
- Publisher: Springer Science+Business Media
- Frequency: Quarterly
- Impact factor: 1.844 (2020)

Standard abbreviations
- ISO 4: Environ. Biol. Fishes

Indexing
- CODEN: EBFID3
- ISSN: 0378-1909 (print); 1573-5133 (web)
- LCCN: 76648815
- OCLC no.: 02986368

Links
- Journal homepage; Online access

Environmental Biology of Fishes is a peer-reviewed scientific journal focusing on all aspects of fish and fish-related biology, and the links to their environment. The journal is published by Springer Science+Business Media and was established in 1976. The current editor-in-chief is Margaret F. Docker (University of Manitoba).

== Abstracting and indexing ==
The journal is abstracted and indexed in the following databases:

- Academic OneFile
- AGRICOLA
- Aquatic Sciences and Fisheries Abstracts
- Biological Abstracts
- BIOSIS Previews
- CAB Abstracts
- CAB International
- Current Abstracts
- Current Awareness in Biological Sciences
- Current Contents/Agriculture
- Biology & Environmental Sciences
- EBSCO databases
- Elsevier BIOBASE
- EMBiology
- Environment Index
- GEOBASE
- GeoRef
- Global Health
- IBIDS
- INIS Atomindex
- PASCAL
- ProQuest
- Science Citation Index
- Scopus
- VINITI Database RAS
- The Zoological Record

According to the Journal Citation Reports, the journal has a 2020 impact factor of 1.844.
