= Theoretical Biology Forum =

- Discipline: Theoretical biology
- Language: English
- Edited by: David M. Lambert

Publication details
- Former name: Rivista di Biologia-Biology Forum
- History: Since 1919
- Publisher: Fabrizio Serra Editore (Italy)
- Frequency: Annual
- Impact factor: 1.2 (2024)

Standard abbreviations
- ISO 4: Theor. Biol. Forum

Indexing
- ISSN: 0035-6050

Links
- Journal homepage

Theoretical Biology Forum (known as Rivista di Biologia-Biology Forum before 2012) is an annual scientific journal covering theoretical biology. According to the Journal Citation Reports, the journal has a 2025 impact factor of 1.2 The journal's founder was Prof Osvaldo Polimanti who was a physician and physiologist and was elected to the Faculty of Physiology at the University of Perugia in December 1913. In 1914 he founded the Institute of Physiology and in 1919, he founded Rivista di Biologia. Previous editors for the journal have included Giuseppe Sermonti and Silvano Traverso.

Theoretical Biology Forum Journal aims to cover the broad field of theoretical biology. In particular, the problems of evolutionary theory are discussed and the possibility of relative mathematical modelling is examined. Historical, philosophical and other chemical and physical subjects linked to biology are also accepted. The current editor in chief is Professor David Lambert of Griffith University Department of Evolution.

Members of the editorial board have included Paolo Freguglia, Lev Beloussov, Eva Jablonka, Marcello Buiatti and Peter Saunders.
