= Intelligent Design Network =

American nonprofit organization

The Intelligent Design network, inc. (commonly IDnet or Intelligent Design Network) is a nonprofit organization formed in Kansas to promote the pseudoscientific principle of intelligent design. It is based in Shawnee Mission, Kansas. The Intelligent Design Network was founded by John Calvert, a corporate finance lawyer with a bachelor's degree in geology, and nutritionist William S. Harris. Its self-described mission is "to promote evidence-based science education with regard to the origin of the universe and of life and its diversity" and "to enhance public awareness of the evidence of intelligent design and living systems."

In June 2000, it made a news release urging Kansas school boards "to reject National Science Standards proposed by Kansas Citizens for Science", complaining that they "would limit teaching to only 'natural explanations'", limiting tuition to only "one side of the controversy" (see Teach the Controversy) and ignoring "[t]he evidence supporting design". In a letter sent the same day to all Kansas school districts, Calvert hinted at legal consequences for failing to admit intelligent design into curricula. In July 2000, two weeks before the Kansas State Board of Education Republican primaries, IDNet held a symposium featuring a number of Center for Science and Culture fellows and affiliates.
