= Istituto Centrale per il Catalogo Unico =

Italian government agency

Coordinates: 41.9062°N 12.5056°E

The Central Institute for the Unified Catalogue of Italian Libraries and Bibliographic Information (in Italian: Istituto centrale per il catalogo unico delle biblioteche italiane e per le informazioni bibliografiche) is an Italian government agency that was created in 1975 to supersede the Centro nazionale per il catalogo unico (National Center for Unified Catalog), that had in turn been created in 1951 to build a single catalog of all the libraries in the nation.

The institute today manages a network of libraries called Servizio bibliotecario nazionale, or SBN; it is answerable to, and technical-scientific advisor for, the Direzione generale Biblioteche e diritto d'autore.
