= Kansas Citizens for Science =

Not-for-profit organization

Kansas Citizens for Science (KCFS) is a science advocacy organization, incorporated as a not-for-profit 501(c)(3), that "promotes a better understanding of what science is, and does, by: advocating for science education, educating the public about the nature and value of science, and serving as an information resource." KCFS has been active in both local and national evolution-advocacy efforts and served as the prototype for other Citizens for Science organizations.

== Formation ==
By law, Kansas' educational standards require periodic revision. In 1999 a 25 person committee of science educators, businesspeople and other community members was assembled by the state board of education to help perform this revision. Creationists managed to influence the revisions to adopt a more pro-creationism, anti-evolutionary stance for state education standards. A local Lawrence, Kansas group called POSH (Parents for Objective Science and History) began lobbying a local school board for creationist changes to the Lawrence curriculum. When the State Board of Education became deadlocked with a 5-5 split on approving the revisions, the group Creation Science Association of Mid America helped to find the 6th vote and pass the pro-creationism science education standards.

Reactions included recruiting those who wrote pro-science letters to newspapers in order to generate a core group of activists. Although these activists originally met to coordinate testimony before board meetings, a week prior to the actual BOE vote over the standards, KCFS was incorporated on August 8, 1999. Holding a media conference on the steps of the Kansas Museum of Natural History the next day, they pledged to combat the anti-science activities of the board.

The board would vote 6-4 on August 11, 1999 to approve creation science-friendly standards that minimized teaching the theories of evolution, the Big Bang, and geological time. Although they did not outlaw the teaching of evolution, they did open the standards to local control, prompting several communities, including Pratt, Kansas, to adopt overtly creationist standards.

KCFS recruited participants from across the state and led the fight to correct the standards the creationists had passed. They formed relationships with educational and scientific organizations both across Kansas and throughout the US. At the next election, Kansas voters replaced the creationists with a pro-science majority and within a few months, the standards recommended by the expert committee were passed, replacing the creationist standards that de-emphasized evolution.

== The National Citizens for Science Movement ==
The method whereby KCFS organized was noted by national pro-science organizations. The attacks on evolution are nationwide and prominent members of the pro-science community are pushing for nationwide duplication of the KCFS method. One result was the Citizens for Science movement, which seeks to promote communication and cooperation between KCFS-like entities in each state.
