= 2014 in religion =

This is a timeline of events during the year 2014 which relate to religion.

== Events ==
- 4 February — The Bill Nye–Ken Ham debate occurs.
- 18 February — The Jin Taw Yan temple opens in Mandalay, Myanmar.
- 27 April – The Catholic Church canonises John XXIII and John Paul II.
- 29 June – The Islamic State declares itself a caliphate.

=== Date Unknown ===
- The Modern English Version of the Christian Bible is completed.
