= Structure Films =

Structure Films is an American documentary film production company with a focus on science, health, information, and technology. Founding filmmakers Jason Sussberg and David Alvarado met in a documentary filmmaking program at Stanford University where they both earned their MFA degrees in film.

Structure Film's first full-length feature is The Immortalists (2014), following short films Lithium (2014) and DeExtinction (2014). Their most recent film, Bill Nye: Science Guy, a documentary about science communicator and PBS children's show star Bill Nye of Bill Nye the Science Guy, is currently being screened at film festivals following its premiere at the South by Southwest Film Festival in March 2017.

Productions of Structure Films have screened in major international festivals including South by Southwest, Hot Docs International, and London International Film Festival; broadcast on the BBC, TIME, and Outside Magazine; and supported by the Sundance Institute, Tribeca Film Institute, ITVS and the MacArthur Foundation.
