= Corey S. Powell =

American science writer and journalist (born 1966)

Corey Stevenson Powell
- Born: January 7, 1966 (age 60)
- Education: Harvard University
- Occupation: Journalist

Corey Stevenson Powell (born January 7, 1966) is an American science writer and journalist, particularly known for his writing for Discover magazine, of which he became Editor-in-Chief in 2012, and his longstanding collaboration with Bill Nye. Powell co-authored three books with Nye, and as of 2019 co-hosted a podcast with Nye as well.

== Early life, education ==
Powell graduated from Harvard University with a degree in history and science, with his senior thesis, published in 1988, being on "J. Homer Lane and the Internal Structure of the Sun." Powell became a writer for Discover and in 2002 published his first book, God in the Equation : How Einstein Transformed Religion. Powell contended therein that traditional forms of religion are giving way to a new cultural fusion of science and mysticism, which Powell called sci/religion. Powell felt that this was brought about to a great degree by Albert Einstein's own embrace of the deistic elements of Spinozism. Reviews were somewhat mixed, with reviewers finding Powell to have strained too hard to find a religious theme in modern science.

== Editor and author ==
Powell was a member of the editorial board of Scientific American, and became the Editor-in-Chief of Discover in 2012. He has additionally been a SHERP visiting scholar at New York University. In 2014, Powell notably disputed the account written by astrophysicist Steven Soter in the segment of Cosmos: A Spacetime Odyssey addressing the story of Giordano Bruno, the dispute described as follows:

Soter... defended the account in dialogue with Discover magazine’s Corey Powell, who studied history and science at Harvard. Powell won this blog debate with Sotor by pointing to more evidence against Bruno as the "lone wolf" discoverer of some things now known to be true.

…

Although the Bruno story is little more complicated than this, Powell was much closer to the truth than Cosmos 2014. Near the end of this blog, Powell, perhaps speaking for Discover as a popular science venue, said, "I greatly admire the entire Cosmos project, which is why I am being so critical here."

Powell has co-authored three books with Bill Nye:

- Everything All at Once: How to Unleash Your Inner Nerd, Tap Into Radical Curiosity, and Solve Any Problem (July 11, 2017) ISBN 1623367913
- Unstoppable: Harnessing Science to Change the World (Nov 10, 2015) ISBN 1250007143
- Undeniable: Evolution and the Science of Creation (Nov 4, 2014) ISBN 1250007135

Beginning in 2019, Powell co-hosted Nye's podcast, of which Nye commented that Powell was "very well read about the news of science, and he offers charming commentary".

== Personal life ==
Powell is married with two daughters, and lives in Brooklyn.
