= Riverside Cemetery (Fairhaven, Massachusetts) =

Cemetery in Fairhaven, Massachusetts, US

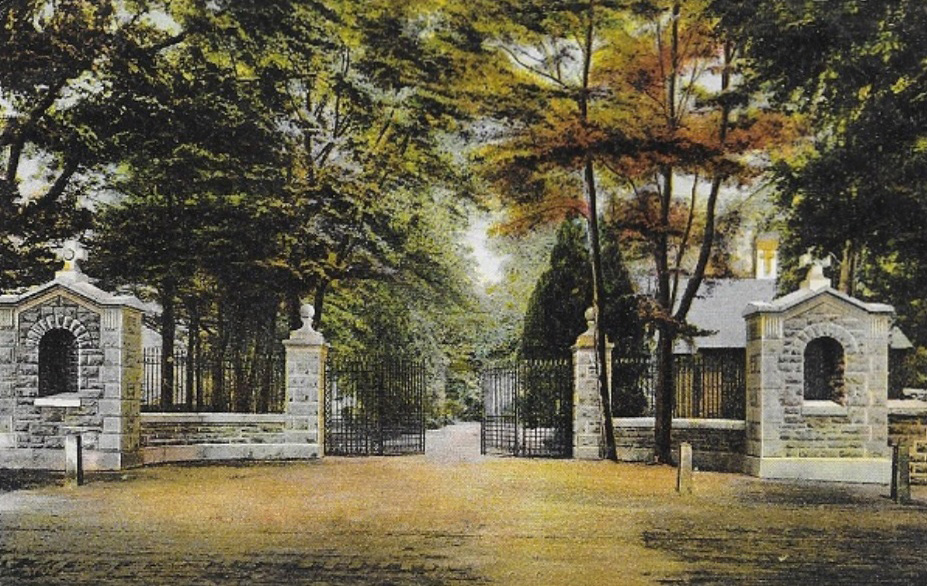
- The entrance to Riverside Cemetery in 1907
- Interactive map of Riverside Cemetery

Details
- Established: 1850
- Location: Fairhaven, Massachusetts
- Country: United States
- Coordinates: 41.6522°N 70.9125°W
- Find a Grave: Riverside Cemetery

Riverside Cemetery is a cemetery located in Fairhaven, Massachusetts at 274 Main Street. Laid out in the rural style, it was established in 1850 by Warren Delano II, the grandfather of Franklin Delano Roosevelt.

== History ==
By the late 1840s Fairhaven's old burial ground, established in 1771 and later known as the Railroad Cemetery, could no longer accommodate the increasing population of the town which had become a center for shipping and the whale industry. In addition, the Fairhaven Branch Railroad was being planned which would require closing part of the old burial ground. Warren Delano II purchased 14 acres of farm land in 1847 which was destined for the building of a new cemetery and gifted it to the town of Fairhaven. The cemetery was consecrated on July 7, 1850 with 1000 people in attendance. The first burial there was Mary Evans Delano who had died at the age of 15.

When the railway came to the town in the mid-1850s, half of the bodies in the Railroad Cemetery were moved to Riverside. Eventually, all the remaining bodies there were re-interred at Riverside. A sexton's cottage was built in 1881 and is one of the rare examples of the Eastlake architectural style in the area. Delano purchased a further five acres of farmland in 1889 to enlarge the cemetery. In 1893, Frances Mills was the first African-American to be buried there.

The cemetery was enlarged again in 1905 and now encompasses 44 acres. It is run as a charitable corporation and has also incorporated Naskatucket Cemetery, another 18th century burial ground in Fairhaven.

== Notable burials and monuments ==
Riverside Cemetery

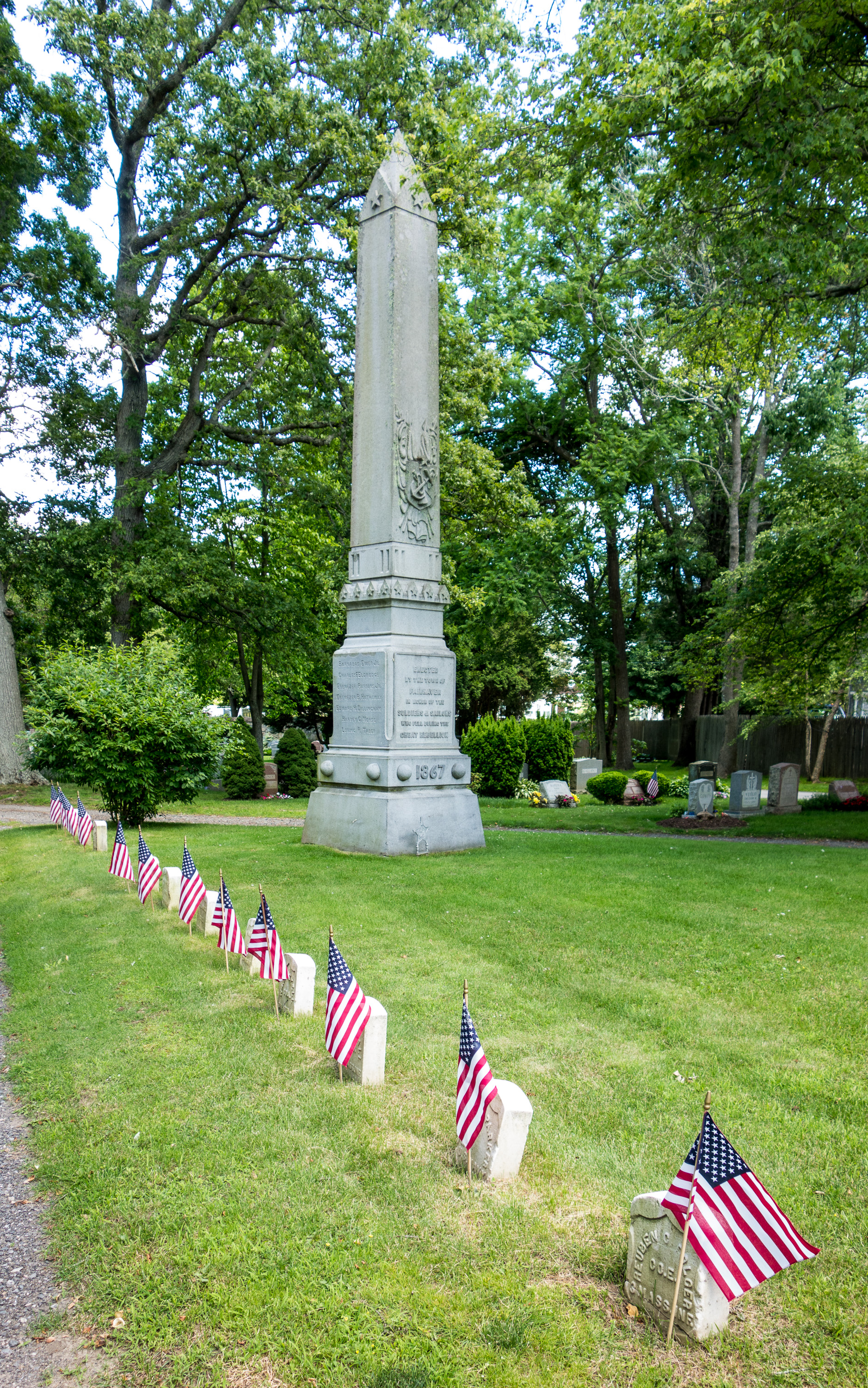
Civil War memorial

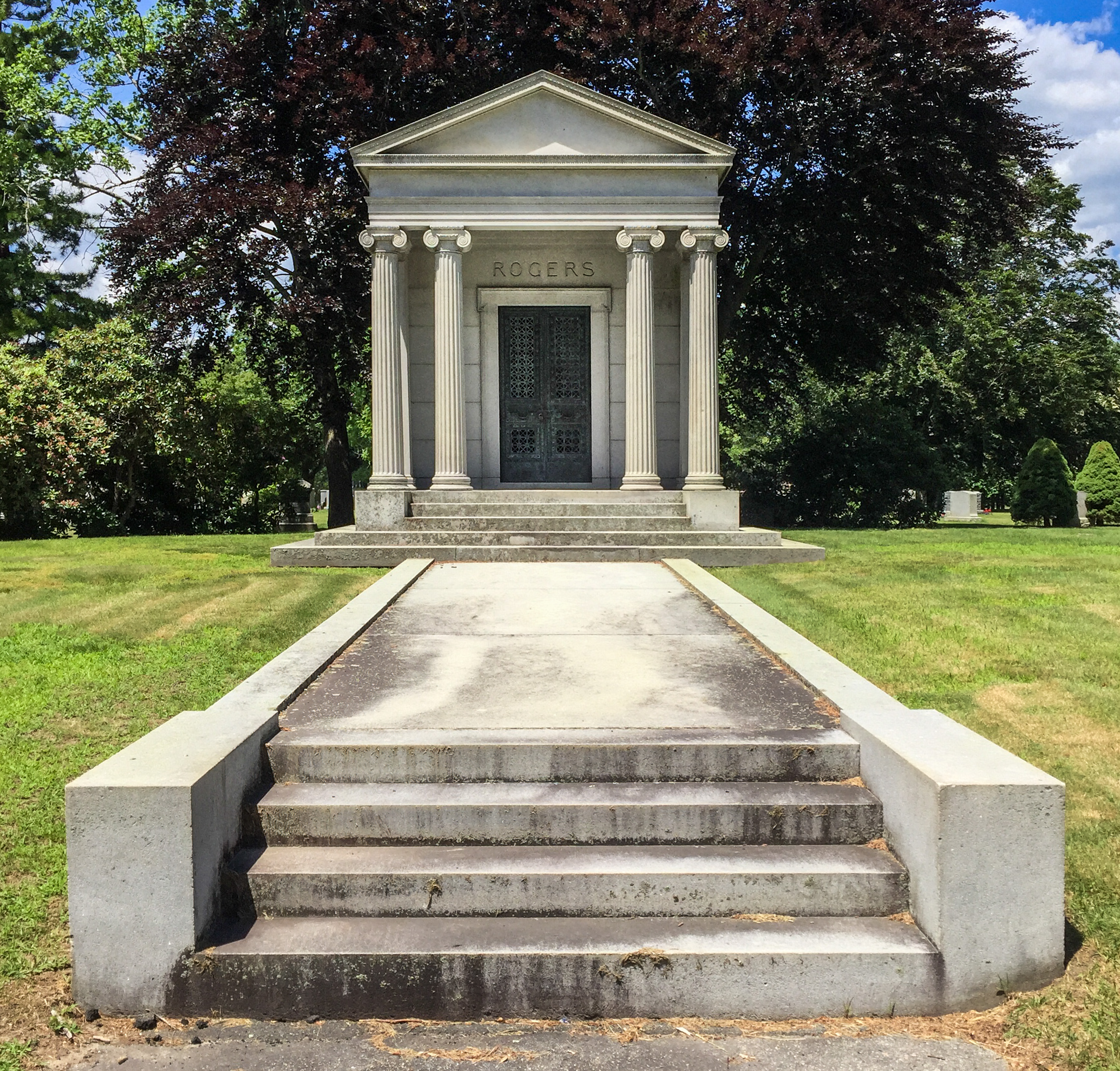
Henry Huttleston Rogers Mausoleum

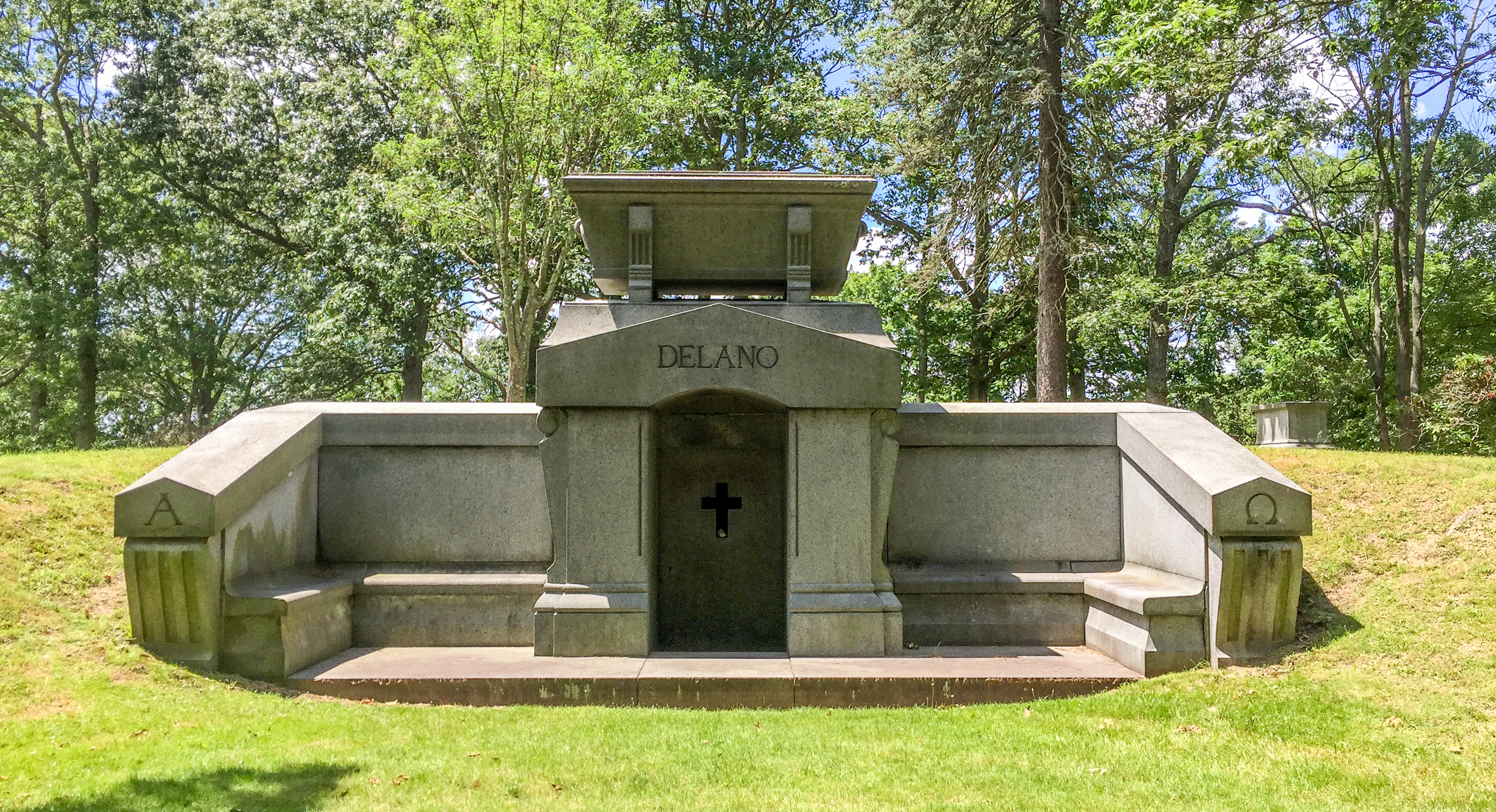
Delano family tomb

A monument designed by George F. Meacham to commemorate the soldiers and sailors from Fairhaven who had died in the Civil War was erected in the cemetery in 1868. Twenty members of the Delano family, including Warren Delano I and Warren Delano II, are buried in the Delano family tomb. The tomb was erected in 1859 and designed by Richard Morris Hunt. Henry Huttleston Rogers, his wife Abbie G. Rogers, and three of their children are interred in a mausoleum erected in 1893 which was designed by Charles Brigham after an ancient temple to Minerva. Other notable burials include:

- William Bradford (1823–1892), artist and photographer
- William Howell Forbes (1837–1896), businessman and uncle of Franklin Delano Roosevelt
- William Foster Nye (1824–1910), founder of a lubricating oil business still in existence today and known as Nye Lubricants.
- Warren Delano Robbins (1885–1935), diplomat and first cousin of Franklin Delano Roosevelt.
- Noah Stoddard (1755–1850), privateer who distinguished himself during the American Revolution
- George W. Weymouth (1850–1910), U.S. Representative from Massachusetts
- William H. Whitfield (1804–1886), the sea captain who rescued Nakahama Manjirō from a shipwreck in 1841 and supervised his education in Fairhaven.
