= Unstoppable (Nye book) =

2015 nonfiction book by Bill Nye

Unstoppable: Harnessing Science to Change the World
- Author: Bill Nye
- Subject: Environmental science
- Genre: Nonfiction
- Publisher: St. Martin's Press
- Publication date: 2015
- Pages: 352
- ISBN: 978-1250007148
- Preceded by: Undeniable: Evolution and the Science of Creation

Unstoppable: Harnessing Science to Change the World is a 2015 book written by Bill Nye and edited by Corey S. Powell. Published by St. Martin's Press, it is Nye's second book, after Undeniable: Evolution and the Science of Creation, also with Powell, which was also published by St. Martin's Press in 2014. The book is about how to use science to improve the environment and the challenges faced with global warming as well as raising the standard of living.

== Reception ==
BBC science columnist Rose Eveleth wrote a joint review in The New York Times of the audiobook versions of Unstoppable and Leonard Mlodinow's 2015 book The Upright Thinkers. Eveleth found Nye's audiobook "easy to listen to", noting the familiarity of Nye's voice to those who have watched the children's television series Bill Nye the Science Guy. However, Eveleth wrote that both books "stumble" because they "recycle well-known material", describing how Nye "spends a good chunk of his book talking about the setup of his extremely energy-efficient home ... Some of these stories are relevant and interesting. Other times, they feel forced, as if both authors knew that without a personal touch, their books would read like any other general primer on climate change or great men in science." Simon Warthall, in the introduction to an interview with Nye for National Geographic's "Book Talk" column, commented that Unstoppable "mixes science and [Nye's] trademark humor". Jennifer Kay, in a review for the Associated Press, commented on the clarity of Nye's language, writing how "Nye explains the basics of climate science without making Unstoppable feel like a textbook."
