= Mozart in the Jungle =

American television series

- Genre: Comedy drama
- Based on: Mozart in the Jungle: Sex, Drugs, and Classical Music by Blair Tindall
- Developed by: Roman Coppola; Jason Schwartzman; Alex Timbers; Paul Weitz
- Starring: Gael García Bernal; Lola Kirke; Saffron Burrows; Bernadette Peters; Peter Vack; Hannah Dunne; Malcolm McDowell
- Theme music composer: Roger Neill
- Opening theme: "Lisztomania" by Phoenix
- Country of origin: United States
- Original language: English
- No. of seasons: 4
- No. of episodes: 40 (list of episodes)

Production
- Executive producers: Roman Coppola; Jason Schwartzman; Paul Weitz; Caroline Baron; Alex Timbers; Will Graham; John J. Strauss
- Production locations: New York City; Venice, Italy
- Camera setup: Single camera
- Running time: 26–30 minutes
- Production companies: American Zoetrope; Depth of Field; Picrow; Amazon Studios

Original release
- Network: Amazon Prime Video
- Release: February 6, 2014 – February 16, 2018

Mozart in the Jungle is an American comedy-drama television series developed by Roman Coppola, Jason Schwartzman, Alex Timbers, and Paul Weitz for the video-on-demand service Amazon Prime Video. It received a production order in March 2014.

The story was inspired by Mozart in the Jungle: Sex, Drugs, and Classical Music, oboist Blair Tindall's 2005 memoir of her career in New York, playing various high-profile gigs with ensembles including the New York Philharmonic Orchestra and the pit bands of numerous Broadway shows. The series stars Gael García Bernal as Rodrigo, a character based on conductor Gustavo Dudamel, alongside Lola Kirke, Malcolm McDowell, Saffron Burrows, Hannah Dunne, Peter Vack, and Bernadette Peters.

The first season premiered in full on December 23, 2014. Three more seasons, each ten episodes long, followed in 2015, 2016 and 2018, before Amazon announced the show's cancellation.

== Cast ==
=== Main cast ===
- Gael García Bernal as Rodrigo De Souza, the new conductor of the New York Symphony Orchestra
- Lola Kirke as Hailey Rutledge, an oboist with a yearning ambition to play with the New York Symphony Orchestra. She develops a strong bond with Rodrigo as the series progresses.
- Bernadette Peters as Gloria Windsor, the president of the New York Symphony Orchestra (recurring, season 1; seasons 2–4)
- Malcolm McDowell as Thomas Pembridge, the conductor emeritus of the New York Symphony Orchestra
- Saffron Burrows as Cynthia Taylor, a cellist with the New York Symphony Orchestra
- Hannah Dunne as Elizabeth "Lizzie" Campbell, Hailey's roommate and best friend
- Peter Vack as Alex Merriweather, Hailey's dancer boyfriend (seasons 1–2)

=== Recurring cast ===
- Debra Monk as Betty Cragdale, the long-time oboist for the New York Symphony Orchestra who instantly despises Hailey
- Mark Blum as Union Bob, a piccolo player for the symphony orchestra and known for bringing up the union rules
- Jennifer Kim as Sharon, Rodrigo's assistant
- Joel Bernstein as Warren Boyd, the concertmaster for the symphony orchestra
- Nora Arnezeder as Ana Maria, Rodrigo's estranged violinist wife
- John Miller as Dee Dee, the drug-dealing percussionist of the New York Symphony Orchestra
- Rubio Qian as Triangle Tanya, the triangle player of the New York Symphony Orchestra
- Brennan Brown as Edward Biben, an orchestra board member
- Gretchen Mol as Nina Robertson, the New York Symphony Orchestra's lawyer who falls for Cynthia
- Makenzie Leigh as Addison, Alex's dancing partner and roommate
- Margaret Ladd as Claire, Thomas' ex-wife who dies after hearing his completed symphony
- Jason Schwartzman as Bradford Sharpe, a classical music enthusiast and host of his own podcast, "B-Sharpe"
- John Hodgman as Marlin Guggenheim, a purported billionaire infatuated with Hailey
- Wallace Shawn as Winslow Elliott, a neurotic concert pianist
- Tenoch Huerta Mejía as Manuel, Rodrigo's childhood friend
- Dermot Mulroney as Andrew Walsh, a cello soloist who fraternizes with Hailey
- Monica Bellucci as Alessandra, a reclusive Italian soprano living in Venice, Italy, also known as "La fiamma"
- Ana María Martínez provides Alessandra's singing voice
- Christian de Sica as Alessandra's manager
- Bruce Davison as Hesby Ennis, a colleague of Thomas and Gloria
- Sandro Isaack as Pavel, the orchestra's stagehand who becomes friendly with Gloria
- Philip Jackson Smith as Mike Margusa, a friend of Hailey's whom she recruits to work for the orchestra
- Christian Coulson as Sebastian, a member of Andrew Walsh's orchestra who later becomes a member of Hailey's orchestra and moves to her apartment
- Cole Escola as Shawn, Hailey's roommate and a member of her orchestra who also becomes Sebastian's boyfriend
- Miles Robbins as Danny/Erase Face, a DJ with whom Thomas collaborates
- Matthew Maher as Alan Lawford, a colleague of Thomas at the Queens' Philharmonic
- Santino Fontana as Mozart, to whom Rodrigo frequently talks in his imagination
- David Turner as Liberace, briefly replaces Mozart as Rodrigo's muse

== Episodes ==
Season	Episodes	Originally released	
Season	Episodes	First released	Last released
1	10	February 6, 2014	December 23, 2014
2	10	December 30, 2015	
3	10	December 9, 2016	
4	10	February 16, 2018	

== Production ==
The many oboe solos played by the protagonist and other characters throughout the series are performed by Lelie Resnick, principal oboist of the Hollywood Bowl Orchestra, while the character of Rodrigo is loosely based on Gustavo Dudamel, the Venezuelan music director of the Los Angeles Philharmonic. Dudamel coached García Bernal before the latter conducted, in the character of Rodrigo, for a real performance of the Los Angeles Philharmonic at the Hollywood Bowl, scenes of which were used for the second season opener. Dudamel has a cameo in that episode, acting as a stagehand trying to convince Rodrigo to move to Los Angeles. Other musicians with cameos in the series are violinist Joshua Bell, pianists Emanuel Ax and Lang Lang, composers Anton Coppola and Nico Muhly, Broadway star Brian d'Arcy James and conductors Alan Gilbert and Bernard Uzan. Blair Tindall, oboist and writer of the book on which the series is based, also appears in a cameo. Much of the original music for the show (most notably "Impromptu", and other work presented within the show's continuity as by Thomas Pembridge) is composed by contemporary composer Missy Mazzoli. For Pembridge's more experimental music in Season 4, the show turned to another female composer, Laura Karpman. Irish composer and conductor Eímear Noone served as Lola Kirke's real-life conducting coach in season four. Interior shots of the home concert hall were filmed at the Performing Arts Center at SUNY Purchase.

== Focus on women composers and conductors ==
In addition to behind-the-scenes contributions from Mazzoli, Karpman and Noone, the theme of women composers and conductors in the world of classical music became central in the show's third and fourth seasons. Historical female composers who appear in the show include Vítězslava Kaprálová, Isabella Leonarda, Nannerl Mozart and Fanny Mendelssohn. The fourth season featured Pulitzer Prize-winning contemporary composer Caroline Shaw appearing as herself (and the characters perform one of her actual compositions). Composer Paola Prestini also makes a brief cameo in season four, playing one of her own compositions.

== Reception ==
=== Critical response ===
Critical response of Mozart in the Jungle
Season	Rotten Tomatoes	Metacritic
1	91% (35 reviews)	73 (20 reviews)
2	88% (17 reviews)	71 (5 reviews)
3	100% (16 reviews)	84 (5 reviews)
4	100% (10 reviews)	84 (5 reviews)

The first season of the series received positive reviews. Review aggregator Rotten Tomatoes gave the series a 'fresh' 91% rating based on 35 critic reviews, with the critical consensus "Though confined to the isolated world of classical music, Mozart in the Jungle's Gael Garcia Bernal makes this charming little show sing." Metacritic gave the series a 73 out of 100, indicating "generally favorable reviews". Cory Barker, writing for TV.com, praised the series. "What works so well is that Mozart isn't afraid to throw you into a world you're likely unfamiliar with, but it doesn't swim so far into the deep end that you immediately drown in jargon and distanced dramatic stakes." Robert Lloyd, writing for the Los Angeles Times, also lauded the first season. He stated that "Characters who were mouthpieces for attitudes start to seem like people, more complicated than a thumbnail description can accommodate. You grow interested in what will become of them without expecting or rooting for any particular outcome." Kory Grow of Rolling Stone also praised the series: "Thanks to quirky scripts and a smart ensemble cast... it comes off whimsical without ringing off-pitch."

Tim Goodman of The Hollywood Reporter also gave the first season a positive review: "Bernal is both likable and magnetic, and makes the eclectic maestro surge on the screen. He alone is worth streaming the series, but, thankfully, there's a lot more going on here." Brian Lowry, writing for Variety, also lauded the series: "While Mozart is surely a niche confection, the show generally shines by proving long on charm even when it's short on laughs." In a more mixed review, Jeff Jensen of Entertainment Weekly gave the series a B−.

Some socially-minded critics have praised the show's push for gender equity, while others have critiqued the "almost all-white orchestra and main cast" as unrealistic, given the prevalence of East Asian musicians in real-life orchestras.

=== Accolades ===
Year	Award	Category	Recipients	Result	Ref.
2015	Imagen Foundation Awards	Best Actor – Television	Gael García Bernal	Won	
2016	Golden Globe Awards	Best Television Series – Comedy	Mozart in the Jungle	Won	
2016	Golden Globe Awards	Best Actor in a Television Series – Musical or Comedy	Gael Garcia Bernal	Won	
2016	Primetime Emmy Awards	Outstanding Sound Mixing for a Comedy or Drama Series (Half-Hour) and Animation	Thomas Varga, Andy D'Addario, Bill Higley, Chris Navarro (for "Nothing Resonates Like Rhinoceros Foreskin")	Won	
2016	Imagen Foundation Awards	Best Actor – Television	Gael García Bernal	Won	
2017	Golden Globe Awards	Best Television Series – Comedy	Mozart in the Jungle	Nominated	
2017	Golden Globe Awards	Best Actor in a Television Series – Musical or Comedy	Gael Garcia Bernal	Nominated	
2017	Primetime Emmy Awards	Outstanding Cinematography for a Single-Camera Series (Half-Hour)	Tobias Datum (for "Now I Will Sing")	Nominated	
2017	Primetime Emmy Awards	Outstanding Production Design for a Narrative Program (Half-Hour or Less)	Tommaso Ortino, Susanna Codognato, Letizia Santucci (for "Now I Will Sing")	Nominated	
2017	Primetime Emmy Awards	Outstanding Sound Mixing for a Comedy or Drama Series (Half-Hour) and Animation	Andy D'Addario, Gary Gegan, Marco Fiumara (for "Now I Will Sing")	Won	
