= Blair Tindall =

American oboist, journalist, and author (1960–2023)

- Born: Blair Alston Mercer Tindall; February 2, 1960; Chapel Hill, North Carolina, U.S.
- Died: April 12, 2023 (aged 63); Los Angeles, California, U.S.
- Education: Manhattan School of Music (BM, MM); Stanford University (MA)
- Occupations: Oboist; performer; producer; speaker; journalist
- Spouse: Bill Nye (m. 2006; ann. 2006)
- Partner(s): Chris Sattlberger (–2023, her death)
- Father: George Tindall

Blair Alston Mercer Tindall (February 2, 1960 – April 12, 2023) was an American oboist, performer, producer, speaker, and journalist. After spending years as a classical musician, she wrote the 2005 memoir Mozart in the Jungle: Sex, Drugs, and Classical Music, which was later adapted into a television series.

== Early life and education ==
Tindall was born in Chapel Hill, North Carolina, to historian George Brown Tindall and Blossom Tindall. She started playing the piano at an early age and switched to oboe when joining the junior high school band; because of her surname's place in alphabetical order, she was the last person able to choose an instrument, and the only one available was the oboe. She completed high school at the North Carolina School of the Arts, received bachelor's and master's degrees from the Manhattan School of Music, and a masters in communication from Stanford University, which she attended on a full tuition fellowship. She also attended Columbia University.

== Career ==
Tindall spent 23 years as a professional musician in New York City, playing with such groups as the New York Philharmonic, Orpheus Chamber Orchestra, and the Orchestra of St. Luke's, presenting a critically acclaimed solo debut at Carnegie Recital Hall, and earning a jazz Grammy nomination. She also performed on many film soundtracks, including those of the movies Malcolm X, for which she was lauded in CD Review Magazine, Crooklyn, and Twilight. She has also performed with Rolling Stones drummer Charlie Watts at the Blue Note Jazz Club.

Tindall taught journalism at Stanford and music at the University of California, Berkeley and Mills College. She has also received residencies at the MacDowell Colony, Kimmel Harding Nelson Center for the Arts, and the Ucross Foundation.

While studying at Stanford, Tindall supported herself by performing with the San Francisco Symphony and as a soloist with the San Francisco Contemporary Music Players. During this time, she was also a staff business reporter at the Examiner (Hearst) and critic-at-large for the Contra Costa Times in Walnut Creek. She went on to write for The New York Times, Agence France-Presse, the Los Angeles Times, Sierra, The Sydney Morning Herald, and the International Herald Tribune.

In 2005, she published Mozart in the Jungle: Sex, Drugs, and Classical Music (Atlantic Monthly Press), a memoir of her experiences in the classical music world. The New York Times described it as an "eyebrow-raising" book which dispelled the "pristine" image of classical musicians in popular culture. National Public Radio named it one of the top five arts stories of the year. Her book was also lauded by musicologist Richard Taruskin in The New Republic as "the smartest take on [the classical music] situation". In 2014, the book was adapted for an Amazon Studios web video series of the same name. The pilot was written by Roman Coppola, Jason Schwartzman, and Alex Timbers, and directed by Paul Weitz. The series stars Lola Kirke, Malcolm McDowell, Saffron Burrows, Bernadette Peters, and Gael García Bernal.

== Personal life ==
Tindall married science educator Bill Nye on February 3, 2006. The ceremony was performed by Rick Warren at The Entertainment Gathering at the Skirball Cultural Center in Los Angeles. Yo-Yo Ma provided the music. Seven weeks later, the State of California declared the marriage invalid, for reasons that neither Tindall nor Nye have ever revealed. At that point Nye left the relationship and had the marriage annulled.

In 2007, Tindall broke into Nye's house and stole several items including his laptop, which she used to send defamatory emails impersonating him, and damaged his garden with herbicide. In response, Nye obtained a restraining order against her. Tindall acknowledged killing his plants but denied being a threat to him. After violating the order in 2009, Tindall was ordered to pay $57,000 of Nye's legal expenses. In 2012, Nye sued Tindall for the money, saying she had still not paid the fees.

Tindall later started a relationship with photographer Chris Sattlberger, and they were engaged at the time of her death.

== Death ==
Tindall died in Los Angeles on April 12, 2023, at the age of 63. The Los Angeles County Department of Medical Examiner-Coroner ruled that the cause of death was arteriosclerosis, with chronic ethanol consumption given as a contributing factor.
