= Undeniable: Evolution and the Science of Creation =

2014 non-fiction book by Bill Nye

- Author: Bill Nye
- Publisher: St. Martin's Press
- Publication date: November 4, 2014
- Media type: Print
- Pages: 309
- ISBN: 978-1250007131
- OCLC: 898419191
- Followed by: Unstoppable: Harnessing Science to Change the World
- Website: Undeniable on Macmillan.com

Undeniable: Evolution and the Science of Creation is a 2014 book written by Bill Nye. It was co-written and edited by Corey S. Powell and discusses advances in science in support of evolution. The book is Nye's extension of the Bill Nye–Ken Ham debate that took place in 2014.

== Background ==
Undeniable was written by Bill Nye, best known as the host of Bill Nye the Science Guy, which aired from 1993 to 1998 on PBS Kids. The show focused on Nye teaching natural science to a preteen audience. Nye transitioned into cable television where he spoke on the topic of science, including giving speaking tours at colleges and universities. During his speaking engagements, Nye would often become involved in a debate of creationism versus evolution, including a 2014 debate with creationist Ken Ham. Nye attributes this to being the inspiration for him writing the book.

== Summary ==
Nye discusses the creationism versus evolution debate. He lays out evidence about life on earth evolving. He provides an overview of the evolutionary theories such as bottlenecking, punctuated equilibrium, Red Queen hypothesis, and the good enough design theory while at the same time providing counter arguments for creationism theories such as the second law of thermodynamics. Nye also addresses scientific issues that include genetically modified foods and human cloning.

== Reception ==
The book received considerable press, including The New York Times interviewing Nye about his inspiration and the subject of the book and a feature in National Geographic. In addition to The New York Times, the book was reviewed by major news outlets that included The Wall Street Journal, Scientific American, U.S. News & World Report, C-SPAN, HuffPost Live, The Washington Post, and CBS News.

The Wall Street Journal stated that "Mr. Nye makes an eloquent case for evolution." Regarding the debate and the book, Scientific American stated "no matter your stance on whether Bill should have engaged in the original debate or not, this book is a very appropriate follow-up and a terrific gift idea for those who might need a primer in how science looks at the world."

== Revised chapter on GMOs ==
In 2015, Nye stated an upcoming revision of his book would contain a rewritten chapter on GMOs, which he now supports.
