= William Foster Nye =

American businessman (1824–1910)

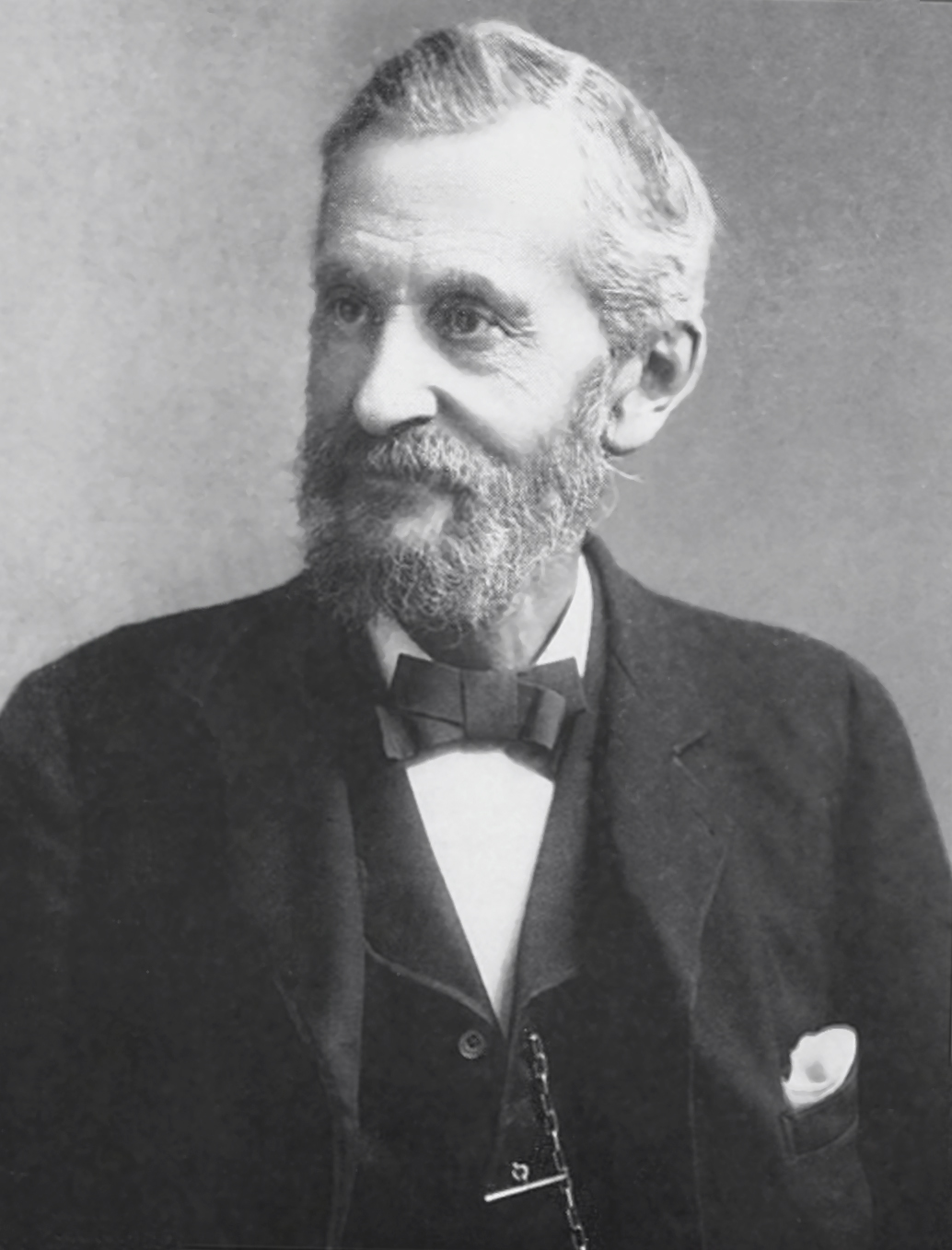
- Born: May 20, 1824; Pocasset, Massachusetts, U.S.
- Died: August 12, 1910 (aged 86); New Bedford, Massachusetts, U.S.
- Occupation: businessman
- Known for: founder of Nye Lubricants

William Foster Nye (May 20, 1824 – August 12, 1910) was an American businessman and founder of a lubricating oil business in New Bedford, Massachusetts, which is still in existence today and known as Nye Lubricants. He was a relative of science communicator Bill Nye.

== Life and career ==
Nye was born in the village of Pocasset (at the time considered part of the town of Sandwich), one of the eight children of Syrena née Dimmock and Ebenezer Nye. His family was descended from Benjamin Nye who had emigrated from England in 1635 and settled in Massachusetts where he eventually built and operated a sawmill near Sandwich.

At the age of 16 Nye was apprenticed to Prince Weeks, a master builder in New Bedford. On finishing his apprenticeship, he worked for a pipe organ-building company in Boston and then spent three years in Calcutta as a carpenter for the Frederic Tudor Ice Company. On his return to Massachusetts he married Mary Keith on May 20, 1851. Nye then sailed to California, crossing the Isthmus of Panama on foot, and arriving in San Francisco shortly after the Fire of 1851 which had destroyed much of the city. He worked in the re-building of the city for several years, helping to construct some of San Francisco's first brick buildings.

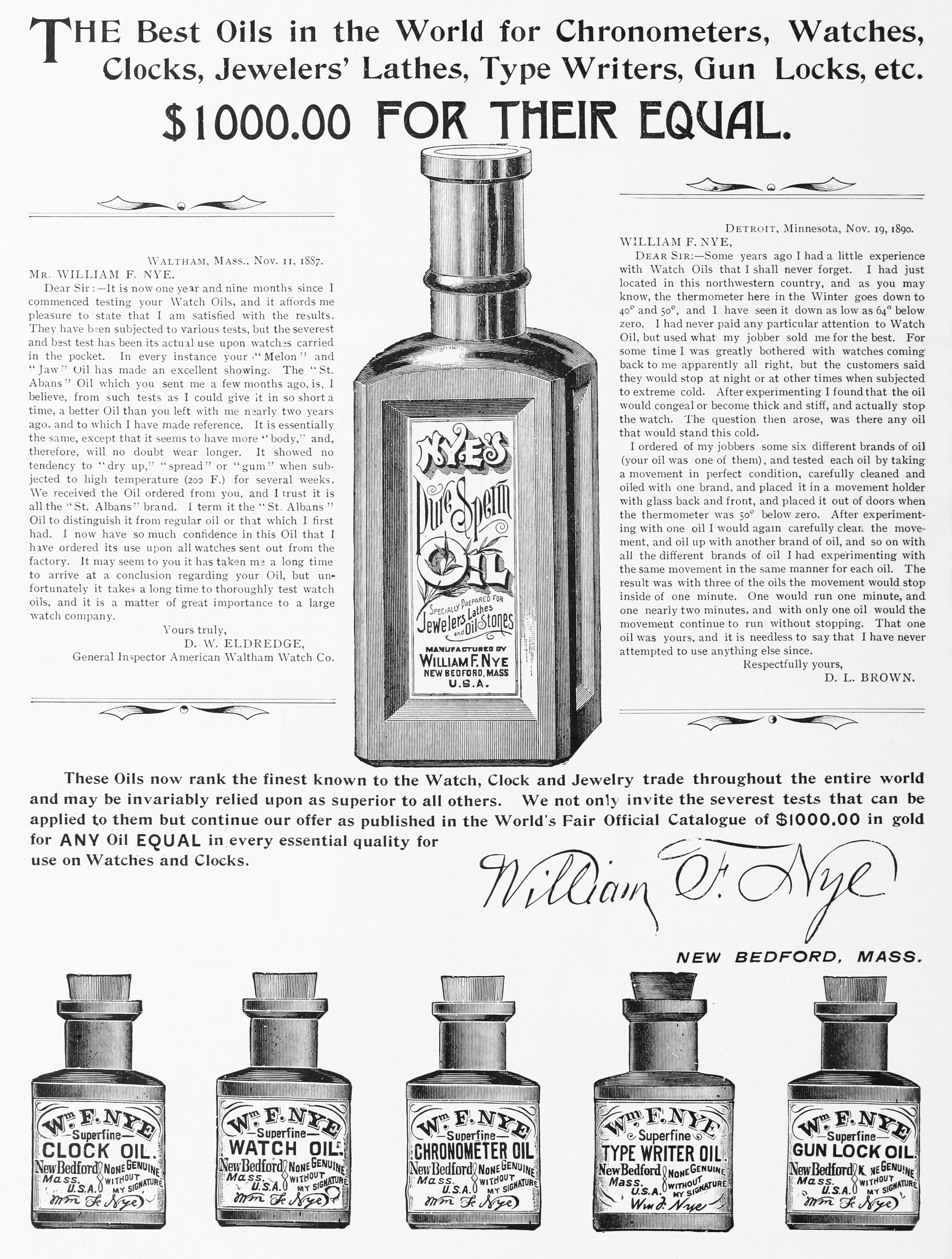
1894 advertisement for Nye's oils

In 1855, Nye returned to New Bedford and set up an oil and kerosene business which he operated until the outbreak of the American Civil War when he joined the Union Army as a sutler to the Massachusetts Artillery and the 4th Massachusetts Cavalry. He was with the advance guard of the cavalry when it entered Richmond, Virginia in 1865 and set up a trading post there in one of the city's remaining brick buildings. For a time he was the sole tradesman operating in Richmond. After his regiment was mustered out in November 1865 Nye returned to New Bedford and began developing the lubricant oil business for which he became principally known.

Nye's oil business, originally run out of small rented premises in Fairhaven, focused primarily on highly refined lubricant oils for watches, clocks, typewriters, sewing machines, and bicycles. In the late 1860s he acquired an entire catch of 2,200 pilot whales which would supply the raw material for his lubricating oils for several years. He expanded the business in 1877 with the purchase of a large brick building on Fish Island which became its principal refinery. By 1888, his company had become one of the world's largest suppliers of refined lubricant oils. In 1896 Nye absorbed Ezra Kelley's oil company, his main rival. He remained actively involved in the business until shortly before his death in 1910 at the age of 86.

Nye's son, Joseph Keith Nye (1858–1923) (Note: Nye and his wife had two other children: Martha Elizabeth (1852–1928) and Mary Athalie (1862–1894).) worked extensively with his father, patented several inventions for the improvement of the refining process, and took over the company after his father's death. After Joseph's death in 1923, the business was acquired by his associate Anderson W. Kelley. (Note: Prior to Joseph Nye's death, Kelley had served as the superintendent of the company and was the executor of Nye's estate.) It was subsequently acquired by the Mock family in 1956 and still operates today under the name Nye Lubricants.

A keen believer in spiritualism, Nye had been one of the founders and most active promoters of the Onset Bay Grove Association. Their summer retreat, Onset Bay Grove, built by the association in the late 1870s, claimed to be the "largest community of spiritualism yet formed in the fifty years history of its teachings." In his later years Nye said of his beliefs:

That I am a spiritualist must be to those I leave behind me the touch that withers my memory or the ever living archway about which they can entwine earth's fragrant flowers and through which they may in gladness follow me to the evergreen shore.

Nye is buried with his wife Mary in Riverside Cemetery in Fairhaven.
