= List of Mozart in the Jungle episodes =

Mozart in the Jungle is a television series produced by Picrow for Amazon Studios. The pilot was written by Roman Coppola, Jason Schwartzman, and Alex Timbers and directed by Paul Weitz. The show was given a production order in March 2014. It is considered a dramedy.

On February 9, 2016, Mozart in the Jungle was renewed for a third season. On January 30, 2017, Amazon announced that the series had been renewed for a fourth season, scheduled for release on February 16, 2018. As of February 16, 2018, 40 episodes of Mozart in the Jungle have aired, concluding its fourth season. In April 2018, Amazon announced that it had cancelled the show, and it would not air for a fifth season.

== Series overview ==
Season	Episodes	Originally released	
Season	Episodes	First released	Last released
1	10	February 6, 2014	December 23, 2014
2	10	December 30, 2015	
3	10	December 9, 2016	
4	10	February 16, 2018	

== Episodes ==
=== Season 1 (2014) ===
No. overall	No. in season	Title	Directed by	Written by	Original release date
1	1	"Pilot"	Paul Weitz	Alex Timbers & Roman Coppola & Jason Schwartzman	February 6, 2014
What happens behind the curtains at the symphony orchestra is just as captivating as what happens on stage. Brash new maestro Rodrigo (Gael Garcia Bernal) stirs things up, and young oboist Hailey (Lola Kirke) hopes for her big chance.
2	2	"Fifth Chair"	Paul Weitz	Paul Weitz & John Strauss	December 23, 2014
Inspired by Hailey's passion, Rodrigo insists that she play with the orchestra, over the objections of Gloria (Bernadette Peters). Veteran maestro Thomas (Malcolm McDowell) tries to rise above his resentment of Rodrigo, only to face more humiliations. Hailey pays a late night visit to Alex, (Peter Vack) on the eve of her big day -- the moment she's been waiting for.
3	3	"Silent Symphony"	Bart Freundlich	Mark Steilen	December 23, 2014
Alex helps Hailey figure out an easy way to make money, while back at the symphony hall, an older musician collapses when Rodrigo pushes him too hard. After being humiliated by Rodrigo's assistant, Hailey lets off a lifetime of steam, and is caught off guard when Rodrigo makes her an offer to be his personal assistant.
4	4	"You Have Insulted Tchaikovsky"	Daisy von Scherler Mayer	David I. Stern	December 23, 2014
Gloria hosts a fundraiser to introduce Rodrigo. Hailey is sent to retrieve him and Thomas steps in to perform. When Rodrigo finally arrives to wow the crowd, Thomas can no longer contain himself. But the new maestro isn't enjoying himself -- he's haunted by a message: something important is coming.
5	5	"I'm with the Maestro"	Tricia Brock	Alex Timbers and Nikki Schiefelbein	December 23, 2014
Rodrigo seeks guidance to rid himself of his "dreadful passion". With Thomas gone on sabbatical, Cynthia bonds with Betty (Debra Monk). In the middle of Alex's showcase -- an intimate dance with his roommate -- Hailey is summoned by Rodrigo to keep him from seeing Ana Maria. When she heads to Alex's apartment later, Hailey meets Alex's beautiful female roommate, and fears that Alex must be sleeping with her.
6	6	"The Rehearsal"	Bart Freundlich	Story by : Paula Yoo; Teleplay by : John Strauss & David I. Stern	December 23, 2014
As pressure mounts before the launch of a new season, Rodrigo erupts. His behavior alarms the Symphony orchestra's business advisor, Edward, who warns Gloria to rein him in - just as her star conductor takes the orchestra on a surprise field trip. In the wake of all this, Hailey arrives home to find Alex, who wonders why she hasn't returned his calls.
7	7	"You Go to My Head"	Roman Coppola	Adam Brooks and Kate Gersten	December 23, 2014
At a fundraising gala at an estate, Edward offers a large sum if Rodrigo will play the violin. Rodrigo ups the ante and turns the tables. Hailey runs into Lizzie, and discovers her roommate has been hiding her upper crust roots -- before spending the rest of the night impressing a man with aristocratic credentials of his own.
8	8	"Mozart with the Bacon"	Adam Brooks	Roman Coppola & Jason Schwartzman	December 23, 2014
When Rodrigo decides he doesn't want Windsor Eliot for his opening night, the legendary pianist confronts him, and ends up helping him realize who he does want. Cynthia is sent to track down Thomas, but isn't quite prepared for what greets her. Hailey gives an intimate oboe lesson to her wealthy new friend, but the session is interrupted by Lizzie, who has some surprising news about her pupil.
9	9	"Now, Fortissimo!"	Daryl Wein	Alex Timbers	December 23, 2014
Rodrigo summons Hailey to drive him upstate to find Ana Maria, explaining that she "makes him alive", exactly what the orchestra needs on opening night. Back in the city, Cynthia takes some pills for her wrist, and in an inebriated state, seduces Union Bob. Hailey finds Alex, ready to feel alive.
10	10	"Opening Night"	Paul Weitz	Story by : John Strauss & Paul Weitz; Teleplay by : Paul Weitz	December 23, 2014
After a harsh verdict from Betty, Hailey is ready to give up on her dream. But as the crowd fills the hall for opening night, Betty's cab driver takes her to the wrong location, and Hailey is thrust into Betty's role. As their tempestuous new soloist, Ana Maria, goes off the rails, Rodrigo is forced to make a choice.

=== Season 2 (2015) ===
No. overall	No. in season	Title	Directed by	Written by	Original release date
11	1	"Stern Papa"	Paul Weitz	Paul Weitz	December 30, 2015
To the outside, Rodrigo's tenure as the new maestro is a roaring success, but the conductor is having doubts. Meanwhile, Hailey works to replace herself as Rodrigo's assistant so she can focus on her new position as substitute in the oboe section. Cynthia meets the orchestra's take-no-prisoners lawyer, who develops a strong attraction to Cynthia.
12	2	"Nothing Resonates Like Rhinoceros Foreskin"	Adam Brooks	Roman Coppola & Jason Schwartzman	December 30, 2015
A near disaster during a live performance forces Rodrigo to make some changes in how he conducts not only himself but also his orchestra. Gloria extends an invitation to Hailey to appear on banners advertising the orchestra, in an attempt to appeal to a younger audience. But, as the young oboist will soon find out, there is no such thing as a free dinner.
13	3	"It All Depends on You"	Adam Brooks	Stuart Blumberg	December 30, 2015
After one drum circle too many, Rodrigo is evicted from his apartment -- though it doesn't take him long to find a new roommate...Gloria. Hailey and Lizzie help Bradford record his podcast about a famed building for artists. Hailey thinks about her future as one of the tenants recounts some famous performances. The threat of a strike causes some musicians to feel the heat.
14	4	"Touché Maestro, Touché"	Jason Schwartzman	Alex Timbers	December 30, 2015
Guest cellist, Andrew Walsh (Dermot Mulroney) invites Hailey out to see Lang Lang play, and gives her her first glimpse inside the world of classical music's elite crew. They end up sleeping with each other. Thomas and Rodrigo enjoy a rare guys' night in and end up in a tent in a living room, exploring the farthest corners of their minds. Gloria proves she is more than she appears, and sings at an open-mic event at a small bar.
15	5	"Regreso Del Rey"	Roman Coppola	Adam Brooks	December 30, 2015
Hailey has more work than she planned on during the orchestra's Latin America tour. When a stolen violin threatens the tour's final concert in front of Rodrigo's former maestro and a potential major donor, Rodrigo has to call an old friend. An adventure through Mexico's underworld ensues, whereby Rodrigo and his friend correctly figure out that Warren Boyd's violin was never stolen, and he was pretending that it was to get a large insurance payout.
16	6	"How to Make God Laugh"	Roman Coppola	Stuart Blumberg & Adam Brooks	December 30, 2015
Rodrigo shows Hailey HIS Mexico and takes her to a performance of his childhood youth orchestra. Thomas and Gloria meet with Juan Luis Delgado, the richest man in Mexico. Cynthia gets a surprise visitor and ends up in an unexpected position. Maestro Rivera, Rodrigo's mentor, asks him to fulfill a promise.
17	7	"Can You Marry a Moon?"	Tricia Brock	David Iserson	December 30, 2015
The gang celebrates Betty's 35 years in the orchestra with some tequila and a special guest. Hailey breaks the cardinal rule of touring: what happens on the road, stays on the road. Negotiations hit a wall and the idea of a work stoppage begins to sink in. Rodrigo develops a mysterious ailment, and must adjust his senses while filming a new Virtual Reality video game.
18	8	"Leave Everything Behind"	Tricia Brock	Rachel Axler	December 30, 2015
Thomas shares his symphony with soon-to-be-ex-wife Claire, who finds the music absolutely breathtaking. A funeral becomes the setting of backstage plotting between the orchestra and the board. Rodrigo attempts to let go of something from his past, but she will have none of it. Hailey goes on a date with a board member and finds out more than she thought she would.
19	9	"Amusia"	Paul Weitz	Kate Gersten & Matt Shire	December 30, 2015
Lennox, a guest "enfant terrible" conductor, brings some anger and fury to the orchestra. Thomas battles his oldest demons and hears the crash of his legacy. Rodrigo does everything in his power to keep the world around him from going out of tune. Nina and Cynthia disagree on negotiation tactics. Through the chaos, priorities become clearer. Changes will be made.
20	10	"Home"	Paul Weitz	Story by : Paul Weitz; Teleplay by : Paul Weitz & Kate Gersen & Matt Shire	December 30, 2015
Things are about to erupt between the board and the orchestra, and Rodrigo prepares to do whatever it takes. As the tables turn with each double cross, no one is safe - not even the greatest composers in history. The future is uncertain.

=== Season 3 (2016) ===
No. overall	No. in season	Title	Directed by	Written by	Original release date
21	1	"La Fiamma"	Paul Weitz	Paul Weitz	December 9, 2016
Rodrigo travels to Venice in search of reclusive soprano Alessandra, also known as "La Fiamma". Hailey finds herself out of place in Venice when touring with Andrew Walsh's ensemble.
22	2	"The Modern Piece"	Will Graham	Kate Gersten	December 9, 2016
The New York Symphony strike continues. Thomas finds himself an interesting collaborator. Back in Venice, Rodrigo introduces Alessandra to a new opera all about Joey Buttafuoco. Alessandra gives Hailey an offer to be her dresser. Gloria and Thomas start hooking up.
23	3	"My Heart Opens to Your Voice"	Patricia Rozema	Will Graham	December 9, 2016
The Mayor of New York (Danny Glover) calls an emergency meeting to end the lockout once and for all. Rodrigo keeps Alessandra occupied.
24	4	"Avventura Romantica"	Patricia Rozema	Susan Coyne	December 9, 2016
The striking musicians sneak into the locked out Symphony Hall. Alessandra goes missing after making love to Rodrigo. When Rodrigo goes searching for her, he has Hailey sub for him. Gloria and Thomas arrive in Venice.
25	5	"Now I Will Sing"	Paul Weitz	Paul Weitz & Peter Morris	December 9, 2016
Rodrigo conducts Alessandra in her big return concert. Placido Domingo tells Rodrigo some sad news about his mentor, who has recently died.
26	6	"Symphony of Red Tape"	Azazel Jacobs	Hannah Bos & Paul Thureen	December 9, 2016
Rodrigo and Hailey return to New York. Rodrigo takes drastic measures to end the lockout. Hailey reunites with Lizzie to find her emulating Czech composer Vítězslava Kaprálová.
27	7	"Not Yet Titled"	Roman Coppola	Roman Coppola	December 9, 2016
This episode is presented as an untitled documentary film by Bradford Sharpe all about the New York Symphony's return to performing after the end of the lockout. This episode includes the works of Olivier Messiaen exclusively.
28	8	"Circles Within Circles"	Tricia Brock	Noelle Valdivia	December 9, 2016
Gloria introduces Thomas to her parents. Rodrigo gets insomnia. Hailey recruits musicians for a special ensemble, where they will be performing music composed by Thomas. Cynthia discovers she has carpal tunnel syndrome, and considers whether to have surgery. As she is leaving, she meets a professional basketball player who has recently had surgery, played by former NBA star Baron Davis.
29	9	"Creative Solutions for Creative Lives"	Gael García Bernal	Susan Coyne & Will Graham	December 9, 2016
After Rodrigo announces a new youth orchestra, much to the ire of Gloria, he attempts to fund it himself. Hailey makes her conducting debut leading a small orchestra for Thomas' newest composition, and it is considered a success.
30	10	"You're the Best or You F'ing Suck"	Paul Weitz	Paul Weitz	December 9, 2016
To help raise funds, Rodrigo agrees to appear in some cheesy commercials selling tacos. Hailey auditions to be the first chair oboist of the New York Symphony after Betty's retirement. However, she loses out to someone else Hailey meets at the auditions. Cynthia ends up getting surgery on her hand, but will have to wait a few weeks to see if she'll be able to play again. Gloria gives Thomas a special gift.

=== Season 4 (2018) ===
No. overall	No. in season	Title	Directed by	Written by	Original release date
31	1	"The Boyfriend"	Paul Weitz	Paul Weitz	February 16, 2018
Rodrigo expresses his interest in meeting Hailey's parents as he is her boyfriend. Rodrigo starts to work at a Mexican restaurant to fill in for one of his young students at Youth Orchestra. Gloria, Cynthia, Pembridge and Rodrigo plan for their next show.
32	2	"If I Was an Elf, I Would Tell You"	Will Graham	Will Graham	February 16, 2018
Hailey and Rodrigo have arrived in Hailey's hometown where she has been asked to lead a master class at the conservatory, Hailey does not want Rodrigo to tell her parents anything about her musical life in New York. Gloria receives news that a very VIP will be attending a concert, Cynthia tells a lie to be able to return to the orchestra to perform in this concert.
33	3	"Significant Lover"	Kat Coiro	Sarah Walker	February 16, 2018
The Pope comes to watch Rodrigo's current production, Hailey takes extreme measures to convince Caroline to allow the ensemble to debut one of her compositions. Meanwhile Gloria wants everything to go Perfect.
34	4	"An Honest Ghost"	Tobias Datum	Halley Feiffer	February 16, 2018
The ghost of Mozart has abandoned Rodrigo, while looking to bring him back, it is Hailey instead who receives some inspiration about her dilemmas.
35	5	"The Coach"	Azazel Jacobs	Andrew Pierce Fleming & Matt Kriete	February 16, 2018
Hailey has to decide if she should find better musicians. Thomas begins to find his old self, whilst Gloria has interest from a new company.
36	6	"Domo Arigato"	Paul Weitz	Peter Morris & Paul Weitz	February 16, 2018
The gang head to Japan for a conducting competition. Gloria shows unexpectedly at the event, to ensure that nothing threatens the funding for the orchestra. And Rodrigo meets someone who claims to know Mozart better than he does.
37	7	"We're Not Robots"	Azazel Jacobs	Susan Coyne	February 16, 2018
Rodrigo has to decide what he will do about the Requiem. Hailey has made it into the semi-finals with Rodrigo's coaching making things difficult. Gloria and Thomas get into an argument where the secrets from each other come to a head.
38	8	"Ichi Go Ichi E"	Roman Coppola	Roman Coppola & Susan Coyne	February 16, 2018
Before leaving Japan, Rodrigo and Hailey experience a traditional tea ceremony, where they contemplate what the next phase of their relationship should be.
39	9	"I Want You to Think of Me"	Wendey Stanzler	Sarah Walker	February 16, 2018
Hailey and Rodrigo have returned from Japan, each determined to move on with their lives, whilst Gloria and Thomas fight over Hesby's musical piece.
40	10	"Dance"	Paul Weitz	Paul Weitz	February 16, 2018
Things are not going well in the debut of Hesby's composition, with Rodrigo having to make a choice about the future of his conducting.
