= George Brown Tindall =

American historian

George Brown Tindall (February 26, 1921 – December 2, 2006) was an American historian and author. A professor at the University of North Carolina at Chapel Hill from 1958 until his retirement, Tindall was "one of the nation's pre-eminent historians of the modern South." He served as president of the Southern Historical Association. He held a Guggenheim Fellowship and was a Fulbright Scholar, a visiting Member of the Institute for Advanced Study, and a Fellow of the Center for Advanced Study in the Behavioral Sciences. In 1969, Tindall's book The Emergence of the New South: 1913-1945 was given the Lillian Smith Book Award.

== Early life ==
Tindall grew up in Greenville, South Carolina, graduated from Furman University there, and then served in the Pacific theater in World War II in the U.S. Army Air Forces. After the war he received his Ph.D. from the University of North Carolina at Chapel Hill.

== Personal life ==
He was married to Blossom McGarrity Tindall for 60 years. He was survived by her, his son Bruce Tindall, his daughter Blair Tindall, and his former son-in-law Bill Nye.

== Works ==
- South Carolina Negroes, 1877–1900 (1952)
- "The Benighted South: Origins of a Modern Image" (1964)
- A Populist Reader: Selections from the Works of American Populist Leaders (1966)
- The Disruption of the Solid South (1972)
- The Persistent Tradition in New South Politics (1975)
- The Ethnic Southerners (1976)
- America: A Narrative History (1984)
- Natives & Newcomers: Ethnic Southerners and Southern Ethnics (1995)
