= Bill Nye: Science Guy =

- Release poster
- Directed by: David Alvarado; Jason Sussberg
- Produced by: David Alvarado; Seth Gordon; Kate McLean; Nick Pampenella; Jason Sussberg
- Starring: Bill Nye
- Cinematography: David Alvarado
- Edited by: Annukka Lilja
- Music by: William Ryan Fritch
- Production companies: Structure Films; Exhibit A Complex Corporation; The Redford Center
- Distributed by: PBS
- Release date: March 12, 2017 (SXSW)
- Running time: 101 minutes
- Country: United States
- Language: English
- Box office: $74,909

Bill Nye: Science Guy is a 2017 American biographical documentary film produced and directed by David Alvarado and Jason Sussberg of Structure Films, and produced by Seth Gordon, Kate McLean and Nick Pampenella. The documentary concept was pitched to the film's subject, Bill Nye, by Alvarado, Sussberg, and Gordon at a hotel bar in San Francisco in October 2014. Upon release, it was selected as a NYT Critic's Pick.

== Content ==
The film documents the personal life and career comeback of Bill Nye, the star of PBS children's show Bill Nye the Science Guy. The documentary, which filmed from November 2014 through September 2016, follows Nye as he retires his kid show act in a bid to become more like his late professor, astronomer Carl Sagan. In his role as the CEO of The Planetary Society, an organization founded by Sagan in 1980, Nye sets out to accomplish Sagan's dream of putting a solar sail into space. In his more mature persona, Nye reaches out to a wider audience using his trademark enthusiasm for science advocacy and education, but he is pulled away when he is challenged by evolution and climate change contrarians to defend the scientific consensus.

== Cast ==
- Bill Nye, star of PBS children's series Bill Nye the Science Guy, mechanical engineer, science communicator, The Planetary Society CEO, and comedian.
- Neil deGrasse Tyson, American astrophysicist, author, and science communicator.
- Ann Druyan, Emmy Award-winning American writer and Peabody Award-winning producer specializing in the communication of science. She co-wrote the 1980 PBS documentary series Cosmos, hosted by Carl Sagan, whom she married in 1981.
- Heather Berlin, American neuroscientist noted for her work in science communication and outreach.
- Michael E. Mann, American climatologist and geophysicist, currently director of the Earth System Science Center at Pennsylvania State University.
- Francis Collins, American physician-geneticist noted for his discoveries of disease genes and his leadership of the Human Genome Project.
- Eugenie Scott, American physical anthropologist, a former university professor and an activist opposing the teaching of young Earth creationism and intelligent design in schools.
- Ken Ham, Australian Christian fundamentalist, Young Earth creationist, and founder of the Creation Museum and Ark Encounter.
- Joe Bastardi, American meteorologist and weather forecaster known for his denial of anthropogenic global warming.

== Release ==
Bill Nye: Science Guy premiered on March 12, 2017, at the South by Southwest film festival in Austin, Texas. In April 2017, the film made its West Coast premiere at the San Francisco International Film Festival, followed by an international screening at Hot Docs Canadian International Documentary Film Festival in May 2017, and another May screening at the Montclair Film Festival in New Jersey.

== Reception ==
On the review aggregator website Rotten Tomatoes, the film has a 100% approval rating, based on 26 reviews. The website's consensus reads, "Bill Nye: The Science Guy is as edifying as it is entertaining, much like the scientist turned TV celebrity and political advocate himself."

On October 26, 2017, the film was reported to be a NYT Critic's Pick.
