= Bill Nye–Ken Ham debate =

2014 debate on the origins of the universe

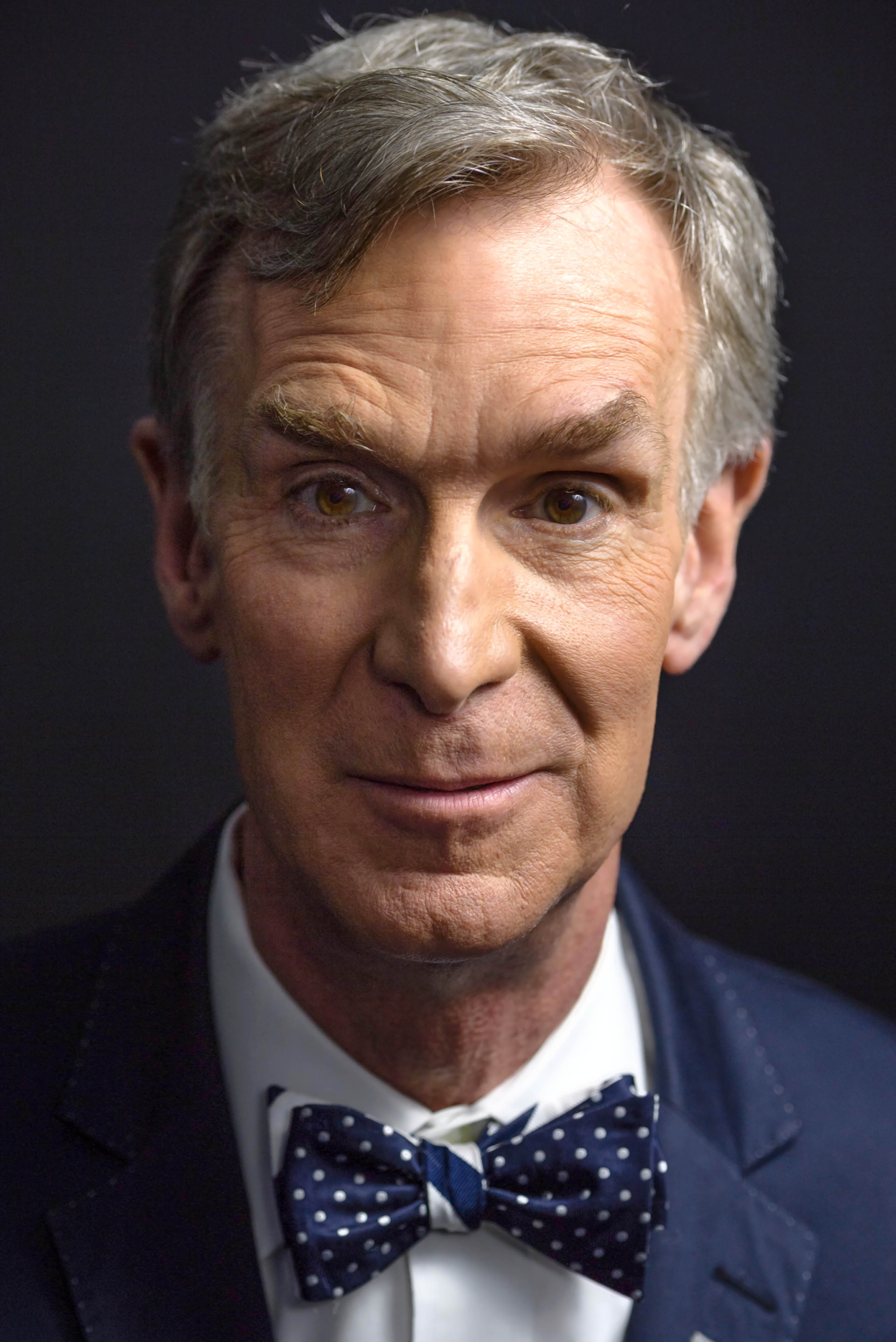
Bill Nye

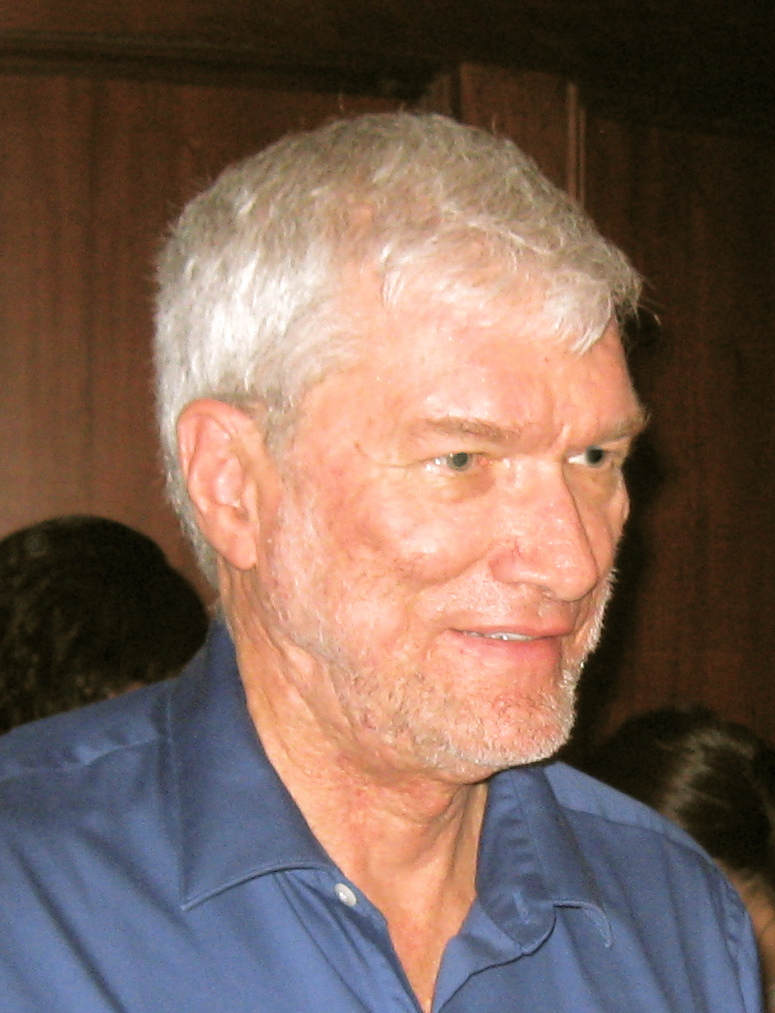
Ken Ham

The debate between Bill Nye and Ken Ham on the question "Is Creation A Viable Model of Origins?" was held February 4, 2014, at the Creation Museum in Petersburg, Kentucky.

Ken Ham, founder and chief executive officer of the Young Earth creationist (YEC) ministry Answers in Genesis (AiG), challenged Bill Nye, a science educator best known for hosting the 1990s television series Bill Nye the Science Guy, to the debate after taking exception to a YouTube video featuring Nye lamenting the refusal of a large segment of the U.S. population to accept evolution. Tickets to the event sold out within minutes, and according to a Christian public relations firm an estimated 3 million people viewed the event live via video streams on the Internet. During the debate, Ham advocated the legitimacy of a YEC model of the universe's origins, while Nye cited observations from a variety of scientific fields to defend the scientific consensus that the Earth is approximately 4.5 billion years old.

Many scientists were critical of Nye for accepting Ham's invitation, claiming his participation in the debate gave Ham's views undeserved legitimacy, but two humanist groups – the American Humanist Association and the Center for Inquiry – praised Nye's decision. Ham later announced that the publicity generated by the debate had spurred fundraising for AiG's planned Ark Encounter theme park, allowing the ministry to begin construction. Both Ham and Nye have since released books on the debate.

== Background ==
On August 23, 2012, the Internet forum Big Think posted a video entitled "Creationism is Not Appropriate for Children" on YouTube. The video featured Bill Nye complaining that a significant portion of the U.S. population does not believe in evolution, asserting that this disbelief has a detrimental impact on science education in the U.S., and encouraging parents who have doubts about evolution not to teach them to their children "because we need them." In a follow-up interview with the Associated Press, Nye said, "If we raise a generation of students who don't believe in the process of science, who think everything that we've come to know about nature and the universe can be dismissed by a few sentences translated into English from some ancient text, you're not going to continue to innovate." By September 2012, the Associated Press reported that Nye's video had been viewed 4.6 million times and garnered 186,000 comments.

Days after the Nye video was posted, the YEC ministry Answers in Genesis (AiG) posted a video response featuring AiG scientists David Menton and Georgia Purdom. AiG founder and executive director Ken Ham also objected to the claims in Nye's video in a post on his blog, Answers with Ken Ham. Soon after, Ham began trying to convince Nye to visit AiG's Creation Museum in Petersburg, Kentucky, which presents a YEC viewpoint that the Earth was created by the God of the Bible approximately 6,000 years ago and dinosaurs and humans once co-existed, based on a literal reading of the book of Genesis, in contrast to the scientific consensus that the Earth is approximately 4.5 billion years old and the existence of dinosaurs and humans is separated by about 60 million years. On January 2, 2014, Ham announced on his Facebook page that Nye had accepted his invitation to a debate at the museum. AiG agreed to pay Nye's travel expenses, and the date – February 4, 2014 – was close to one of Nye's previously scheduled speaking engagements at Kentucky's Murray State University. In an AiG press release, Ham commented that "having the opportunity to hold a cordial but spirited debate with such a well-known personality who is admired by so many young people will help bring the creation-evolution issue to the attention of many more people, including youngsters." Of Ham and AiG, Nye said, "This guy and his beliefs are in their midst, and we can't have this way of thinking for our science students, to have people like this organization try to insinuate themselves in our schools is not appropriate and a formula for a darker future." Nye told the Associated Press that he didn't mind holding the debate at the Creation Museum: "It either makes me anxious, or it's an opportunity to influence that many more people and, frankly, have that much more fun."

Many in the scientific community were critical of Nye's decision to participate in the event, claiming it lent undue credibility to the creationist worldview. The Biologos Foundation, an organization promoting the compatibility of science and Christianity, released a statement advocating evolutionary creation, maintaining the position "that you don't have to choose. You don't have to give up Christian faith in order to accept the best, most compelling science. We expect that we'll agree with most of what Bill Nye will say about the science of evolution. Fossils, genetics, and other disciplines give compelling evidence that all life on earth is related and developed over a very long time through natural processes. But we're also brothers and sisters in Christ with Ken Ham. We believe that Jesus is the Son of God, that he died for our sins and rose from the dead, and that the Bible is the authoritative word of God." Others expressed concern that Nye's relative lack of familiarity with evolution – his formal training is in mechanical engineering – and inexperience in debates might lead some to conclude that Ham won the debate. "I am by no means an expert on most of this," Nye later admitted, but added, "In this situation, our skeptical arguments are not the stuff of Ph.Ds. It's elementary science and common sense." In preparation for the event, Nye had lunch with scientists who specialize in evolutionary theory and traveled to Oakland, California, to meet with the staff of National Center for Science Education (NCSE), an advocacy group for teaching evolution. In an op-ed for CNN, Nye answered critics, saying, "In short, I decided to participate in the debate because I felt it would draw attention to the importance of science education here in the United States." He later conceded that he had underestimated the debate's impact, saying he expected it to draw attention comparable to his scholarly presentations at college campuses.

Leaders of two humanist groups – the American Humanist Association (AHA) and the Center for Inquiry – praised Nye's decision to participate in the debate. AHA director of development and communications Maggie Ardiente told The Washington Post, "I am looking at statistics and they tell me people like Ken Ham and other creationists are being very effective and that is a serious problem. We can't just ignore that. We have to challenge people like Ken Ham so I support the debate 100 percent." Debbie Goddard, the Center for Inquiry's director of outreach, concurred: "If we don't let [creationists'] ideas see the light of day we can't develop the tools to address them. And we don't just need the tools of facts and evidence, but also of understanding their views and compassion for them if we want to be effective at changing their minds."

== Attendance and viewership ==
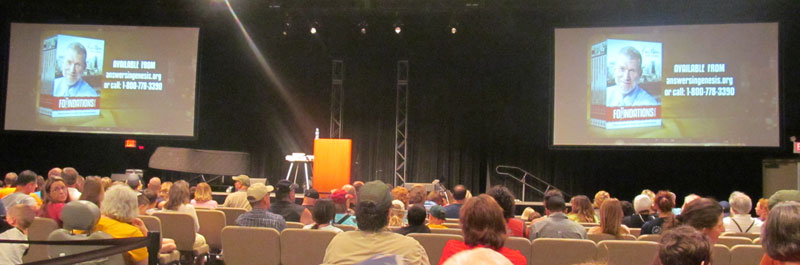
Legacy Hall, the site of the debate

Tickets to the debate, entitled "Is Creation A Viable Model of Origins?" and held in the Creation Museum's 900-seat Legacy Hall, went on sale for $25 each on January 6 and sold out within minutes. Creation Museum officials reported that tickets were sold to residents of 29 different states. Ham told The Daily Beast that "the ticket sales won't come to half the cost of the debate."

Over 70 media credentials were distributed for the event. The debate was streamed live over the Internet at debatelive.org and Google+ Hangouts On Air. Approximately 750,000 computers logged into the live stream. The event was widely discussed on Facebook and Twitter, with commenters frequently employing the hashtag #HamonNye. Approximately 10,000 groups from churches, schools, and colleges informed AiG of their intent to host viewing groups. Christian public relations firm A. Larry Ross Communications estimated that almost 3 million people viewed the event live over the Internet. Immediately after the debate, video footage was made available via YouTube. C-SPAN aired the debate on February 19, 2014.

== Debate ==
Tom Foreman, a broadcast journalist from CNN, was chosen to moderate the debate. Each man was allowed a five-minute opening statement, followed by a thirty-minute presentation of the evidence for his side; each man was then given five minutes to rebut the other's arguments, and then the floor was opened for questions that the audience had previously submitted on cards. Ham won the coin toss to determine which man delivered his opening statement first.

The debate lasted two and a half hours. During his opening statement, Ham declared, "I believe science has been hijacked by secularists." He followed up by pointing to several examples of scientists who profess a belief in YEC, most notably Raymond Vahan Damadian, a pioneer in the field of magnetic resonance imaging.

Ham also drew a distinction between "historical science" and "observational science", a distinction The Christian Science Monitor notes is unique to creation scientists. "We observe things in the present, and we're assuming that has always happened in the past," said Ham, adding, "You've got a problem, because you weren't there." During his rebuttal, Nye asked, "Why should we accept your word for it that natural law changed 3,000 years ago and we have no record of it?"

Nye cited radiometric dating, ice core data, and the light from distant stars to argue that the Earth must be much older than young Earth creationists like Ham theorize. Ham argued that these various dating methods are untrustworthy because they often give varying ages for the same artifacts.

The Genesis flood narrative, which Nye repeatedly referred to as "Ken Ham's great flood", was a major topic of discussion, with Nye arguing that a boat constructed according to the literal parameters given for Noah's Ark in the Book of Genesis would not float. Nye also calculated that, if there were 7,000 "kinds" of animals on the Ark, on average, 11 new species would have had to come into existence every day for the Earth to contain all presently known species.

Towards the end of the debate, Ham admitted that nothing would change his mind concerning his views on creationism, whereas Nye acknowledged that, if enough convincing evidence were presented to him, he would change his mind immediately.

== Reaction ==
No score was kept to declare a winner in the debate. Prior to the event, Ham commented, "I don't see it as a debate to win or lose. I don't believe people should go away saying 'Bill Nye won' or 'Ken Ham won.' I want to passionately deal with what I believe, and I want Bill Nye to passionately speak on what he believes." In a letter published in Skeptical Inquirer after the debate, Nye wrote that by "a strong majority of accounts, I bested him."

Scientists typically stated that Nye won the debate. University of Chicago biologist Jerry Coyne contested Ham's distinction between historical science and observational science: "Science based on historical reconstruction, when done properly, is just as valid as science based on direct, real-time observation." While Coyne felt the debate may have given undeserved credibility to the creationist viewpoint, he concluded that, "The debate was Ham's to win and he lost. And the debate was Nye's to lose and he won." Science blogger Greg Laden, who had earlier expressed concerns about Nye's lack of evolutionary expertise, believed Nye's victory was as lop-sided as the Seattle Seahawks' victory over the Denver Broncos in the recently played Super Bowl XLVIII. He noted that Nye charmed the "evangelical audience" with his style, while the NCSE noted that Ham – "no mean orator", according to the NCSE – "sometimes rambled far afield, and [his presentation] often raced by so quickly that it was hard even to know what he was saying". Daily Beast writer Michael Schulson, however, used the same Seahawks-Broncos analogy to declare Ham the resounding victor. Although Schulson agreed with Nye's underlying scientific message, and allowed that Nye "had his moments," he wrote that "it was easy to pick out the smarter man on the stage. Oddly, it was the same man who was arguing that the earth is 6,000 years old." He believed that Ham's simpler presentation made him sound like "a reasonable human being", while Nye lost his audience by "sounding like a clueless geek, even if his points were scientifically valid".

Evangelical blogger Ezra Byer credited Ham with raising awareness of the Christian message, but felt he failed to provide compelling factual evidence for his beliefs. As partial explanation, Byer noted, "As I watched Mr. Ham's mannerisms, you could sense a tremendous Spirit about him. He was gracious and the power of God showed through his life. There were multiple times I believed he could have hammered Nye on some of his inconsistencies but in my opinion chose not to."

The BioLogos Foundation stated "that one of the lasting effects of this debate will be to further alienate Christianity from science in the public consciousness." The Australian Broadcasting Corporation said that the debate "drew world attention, once again, on the United States as the home of whacky Christianity."

Michael Behe, a biologist at Lehigh University and an advocate of intelligent design, felt that by "talking on about the age of the Earth [rather] than on the elegance and complexities of life", both Ham and Nye lost the debate. Metropolitan Nicholas of the Greek Orthodox Church, who was trained as a scientist before taking holy orders, also criticized both Nye's and Ham's approach to the debate, saying that "Research that is done to challenge God, has the disease of prejudice. Research is done to discover scientific truth. What problem is there with someone wanting to broaden the horizons of their thoughts and knowledge? God is approached better this way. God is not an ideology that we should by all means defend, but we believe in Him because He is Truth. In this sense, even scientific truth reveals Him. If He is still questioned, it is time to find out about Him. A believer who fears scientific research, fears the truth. Perhaps he is a believer who does not believe."

On February 27, 2014, Ham announced that the publicity the debate generated for AiG had spurred fundraising for its stalled Ark Encounter project, allowing the first phase of construction – a 510-foot (160 m) representation of Noah's Ark estimated to cost $73 million – to begin. Following the announcement, Nye told the Associated Press he hopes the project "goes out of business", adding "If [Ham] builds that ark, it's my strong opinion, it's bad for the commonwealth of Kentucky and bad for scientists based in Kentucky and bad for the U.S. And I'm not joking, bad for the world."

== See also ==
- A Scientific Support for Darwinism
- Rejection of evolution by religious groups
- National Center for Science Education
- Project Steve
- Undeniable: Evolution and the Science of Creation
