= Jin Taw Yan =

Buddhist temple in Burma

- 金多堰 ကြင်းတော်ယန်
- Location within Myanmar

Religion
- Affiliation: Buddhism
- Rite: Mahayana
- Ecclesiastical or organizational status: Temple
- Status: Active

Location
- Location: Mandalay
- Country: Myanmar
- Interactive map of Jin Taw Yan
- Coordinates: 21°58′36″N 96°03′29″E

Architecture
- Completed: 2014

Jin Taw Yan (Chinese: 金多堰; pinyin: Jīnduōyàn; Burmese: ကြင်းတော်ယန်ဗုဒ္ဓဘာသာဘုရားကျောင်း), is a Mahayana Buddhist temple located on Strand Road in Mandalay, Myanmar (Burma). The temple was officially opened on 18 February 2014, and faces the Irrawaddy River. Construction began in 2009, and cost approximately 4.5 billion kyats, with 20% of funds coming from the Capital Diamond Star Group. The temple is reputed to be Myanmar's largest Chinese temple.
