= Bill Nye =

American science communicator (born 1955)

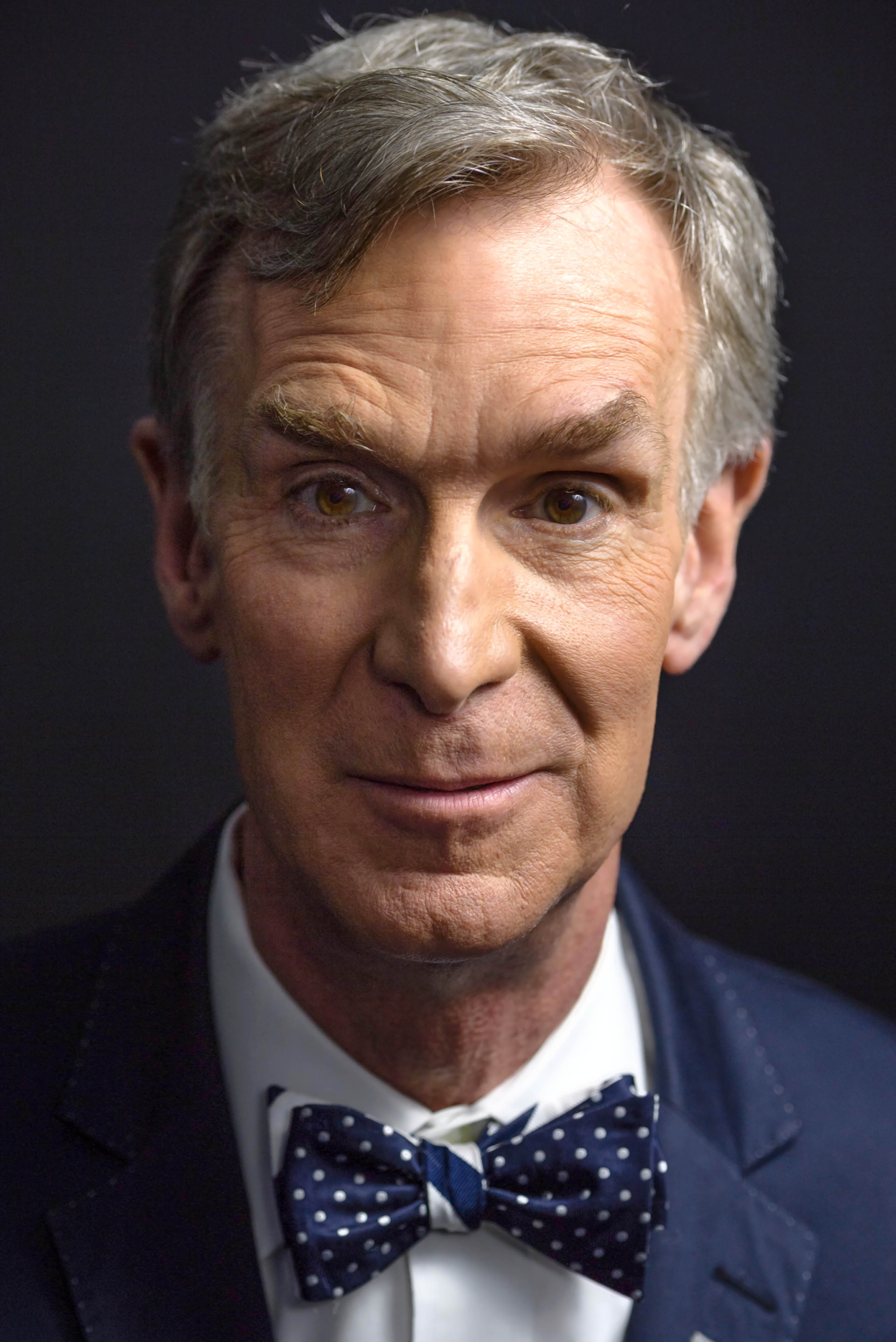
- Nye in 2017
- Born: William Sanford Nye; November 27, 1955 (age 70); Washington, D.C., U.S.
- Education: Cornell University (BS)
- Occupations: Science communicator; television presenter; mechanical engineer
- Known for: Bill Nye the Science Guy (1993–1999); Bill Nye: Science Guy (2017); Bill Nye Saves the World (2017–2018)
- Spouses: Blair Tindall (m. 2006; ann. 2006) Liza Mundy (m. 2022)
- Relatives: George Tindall (former-father-in-law)
- Awards: Presidential Medal of Freedom (2025)
- Scientific career
- Fields: Mechanical engineering; science communication
- Workplaces: Boeing Company; Cornell University; The Planetary Society
- Website: billnye.com

William Sanford Nye (/naɪ/; born November 27, 1955) is an American science communicator, television presenter, and former mechanical engineer. He is best known as the host of the science education television show Bill Nye the Science Guy (1993–1998) and as a science educator in pop culture. Born in Washington, D.C., Nye began his career as a mechanical engineer for Boeing in Seattle, where he invented a hydraulic resonance suppressor tube used on 747 airplanes. In 1986, he left Boeing to pursue comedy, writing and performing for the local sketch television show Almost Live!, where he regularly conducted wacky scientific experiments.

Aspiring to become the next Mr. Wizard, Nye successfully pitched the children's television program Bill Nye the Science Guy to Seattle's public television station, KCTS-TV. The show—which proudly proclaimed in its theme song that "science rules!"—ran from 1993 to 1998 in national TV syndication. Known for its "high-energy presentation and MTV-paced segments", the program became a hit among kids and adults, was critically acclaimed, and was nominated for 23 Emmy Awards, winning 19, including Outstanding Performer in Children's Programming for Nye himself.

Nye continued to advocate for science, becoming the CEO of The Planetary Society. He has written two bestselling books on science: Undeniable: Evolution and the Science of Creation (2014) and Unstoppable: Harnessing Science to Change the World (2015). He has appeared frequently on other TV shows, including Dancing with the Stars, The Big Bang Theory, and Inside Amy Schumer. He starred in a documentary about his life and science advocacy, Bill Nye: Science Guy, which premiered at the South by Southwest Film Festival in March 2017; and, in October 2017, was named a NYT Critic's Pick. In 2017, the Netflix series Bill Nye Saves the World debuted, and ran for three seasons until 2018. His most recent series, The End Is Nye, premiered August 25, 2022, on Peacock and Syfy.

== Early life and education ==
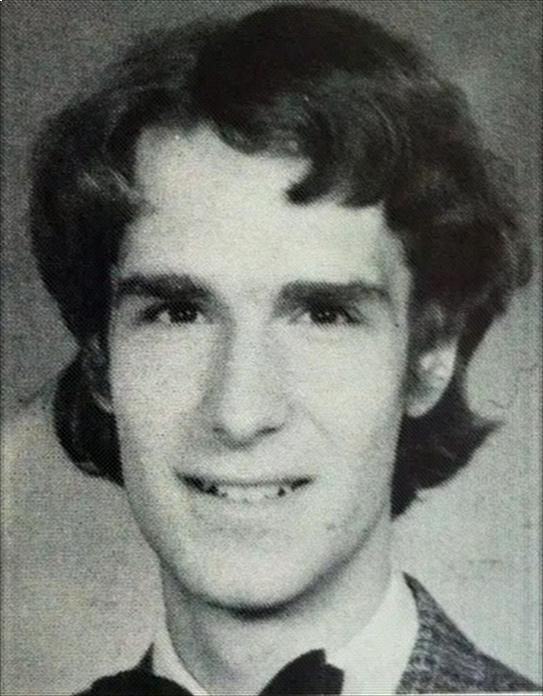
Nye as a senior at Sidwell Friends School in 1973

Nye was born November 27, 1955, in Washington, D.C., to Jacqueline Jenkins (1921–2000), who was a codebreaker during World War II, and Edwin Darby "Ned" Nye (1917–1997), who also served in World War II and worked as a contractor building an airstrip on Wake Island. He is related to William Foster Nye, founder of Nye Lubricants in New Bedford, Massachusetts.

Ned was captured and spent nearly four years in a Japanese prisoner-of-war camp; living without electricity or watches, he learned how to tell time using the shadow of a shovel handle, spurring his passion for sundials. Jenkins-Nye was among a small elite group of young women known as "Goucher Girls", alumnae of Goucher College in Towson, Maryland, whom the Navy enlisted to help crack codes used by Japan and Germany. "She wasn't Rosie the Riveter; she was Rosie the Top-Secret Code Breaker", Nye recalls. "People would ask her what she did during World War II and she'd say, 'I can't talk about it, ha ha ha!'"

Nye attended Lafayette Elementary School and Alice Deal Middle School before attending Sidwell Friends School for high school on a scholarship, graduating in 1973.

After graduating from Sidwell Friends, he attended Cornell University in Ithaca, New York, where he studied at the Sibley School of Mechanical and Aerospace Engineering. His enthusiasm for science deepened after he took an astronomy class with Carl Sagan at Cornell. In 1977, Nye graduated with a B.S. in mechanical engineering.

== Career ==
After graduating from Cornell, Nye worked as an engineer for the Boeing Corporation and Sundstrand Data Control near Seattle. At Boeing, he invented a hydraulic resonance suppressor tube used on Boeing 747 airplanes. He applied four times, unsuccessfully, for NASA's astronaut training program.

=== Comedy ===
Nye started doing standup comedy after winning a Steve Martin lookalike contest in 1978. Nye's friends asked him to do Steve Martin impressions at parties, and he discovered how much he enjoyed making people laugh. He began moonlighting as a comedian while working at Boeing. He has stated, "At this point in our story, I was working on business jet navigation systems, laser gyroscope systems during the day, and I'd take a nap and go do stand-up comedy by night." He also participated in Big Brothers Big Sisters of America, and volunteered at the Pacific Science Center on weekends as a "Science Explainer".

Nye quit his job at Boeing on October 3, 1986, to focus on his burgeoning comedy career. During Nye's 10-year college reunion in 1987, he went to great lengths to meet with Carl Sagan at Cornell. Sagan's assistant told Nye, "Okay, you can talk to him for five minutes." In their meeting at the space sciences building, Nye explained that he was interested in developing a science television program. "I mentioned how I planned to talk about bridges and bicycles and so on—stuff that, as an engineer, I'd been interested in—and [Sagan] said, 'Focus on pure science. Kids resonate to pure science rather than technology.' And that turned out to be great advice."

=== Television ===
In 1986, Nye worked as a writer/actor on a local sketch comedy television show in Seattle called Almost Live! He first got his big break on the show from John Keister who met him during an open mic night. After a guest canceled, cohost Ross Shafer told Nye he had seven minutes of programming to fill. "Why don't you do that science stuff?" Shafer suggested. Nye entertained audiences with comical demonstrations, including what happened when you ate a marshmallow that had been dipped in liquid nitrogen. His other main recurring role on Almost Live! was as Speed Walker, a speedwalking Seattle superhero "who fights crime while maintaining strict adherence to the regulations of the international speedwalking association."

A famous incident on the show led to Nye's stage name. He corrected Keister on his pronunciation of the word "gigawatt", and Keister responded, "Who do you think you are—Bill Nye the Science Guy?" Nye's science experiments resonated with viewers, and the local chapter of the National Academy of Television Arts and Sciences awarded him a talent Emmy for one of his segments. He later hosted a weekly radio show on KJR in 1988 that answered listener questions about science topics.

Even though Nye was a regular on Almost Live!, he was only doing freelance work for the program. While looking for more TV gigs, he got the opportunity in 1989 to host Fabulous Wetlands, a short educational show about Washington's wetlands, sponsored by the Washington State Department of Ecology. On Fabulous Wetlands, Nye explained the importance of preserving estuaries, and the hazards of pollution. The show was, in many ways, a model for Nye's later show, with "zany camera cuts paired with Nye's humor" that set it apart from other scientific broadcasts. Nye soon got more offers to appear on nationally broadcast programs, including eight segments of the Disney Channel's All-New Mickey Mouse Club. Following his stint on Almost Live!, from 1991 to 1993 Nye appeared on live-action educational segments of Back to the Future: The Animated Series, assisting Dr. Emmett Brown (played by Christopher Lloyd). He was a member of the Seattle Bicycle Advisory Board from 1992 to 1994.

==== Bill Nye the Science Guy ====
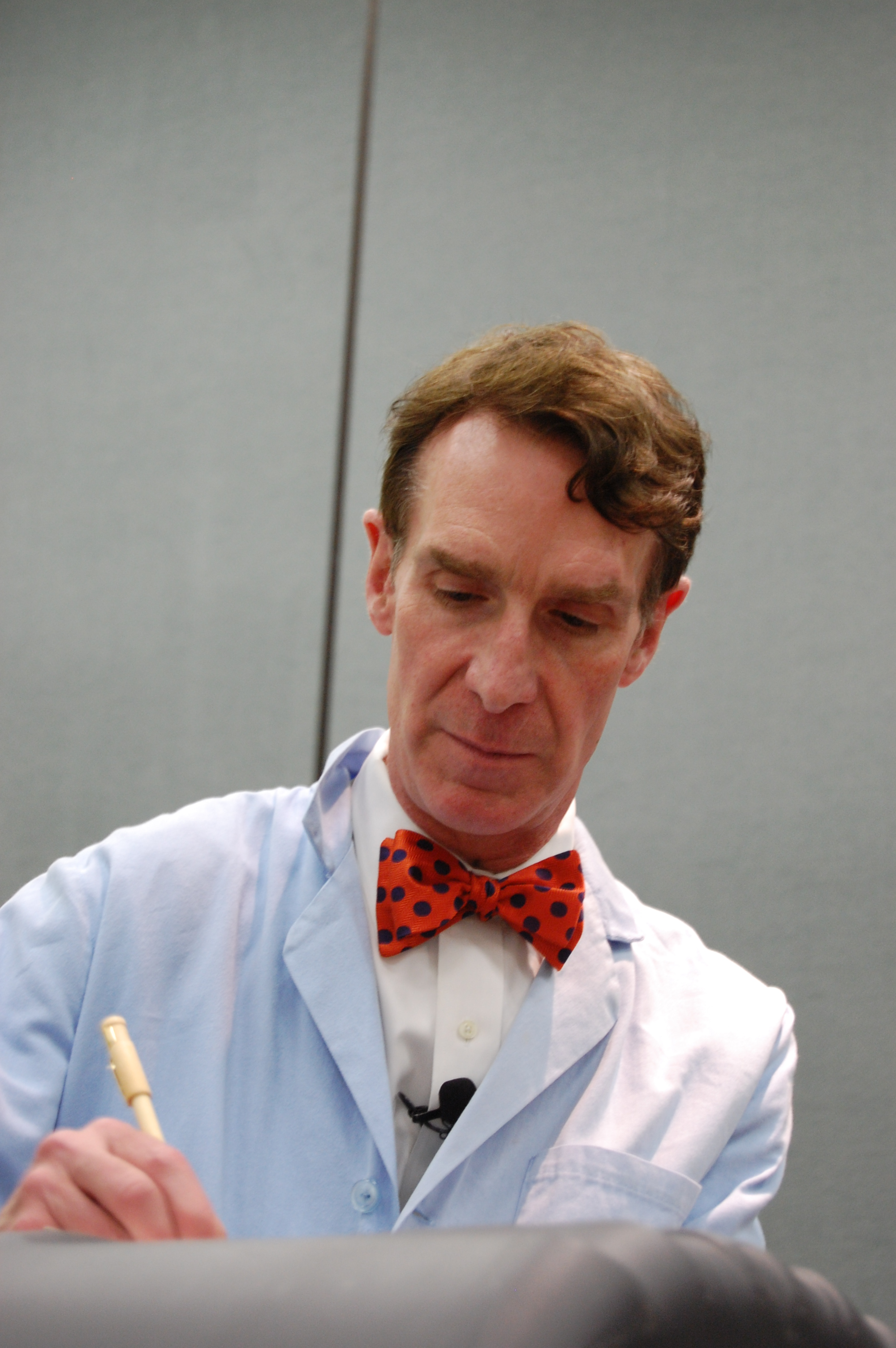
Bill Nye the Science Guy, wearing his trademark blue lab coat and bowtie, 2010

In 1993, collaborating with James McKenna, Erren Gottlieb and Elizabeth Brock, Nye developed a pilot for a new show, Bill Nye the Science Guy, for the Seattle public broadcasting station KCTS-TV. They pitched the show as "Mr. Wizard meets Pee-wee's Playhouse". Nye obtained underwriting for the show from the National Science Foundation and the US Department of Energy. The program became part of a package of syndicated series that local stations could schedule to fulfill Children's Television Act requirements. Because of this, Bill Nye the Science Guy became the first program to run concurrently on public and commercial stations. The series was produced by Walt Disney Television and Rabbit Ears Productions, and distributed by Disney.

Bill Nye the Science Guy ran from 1993 to 1998, and was one of the most-watched educational TV shows in the United States. While portraying "The Science Guy", Nye wore a powder blue lab coat and a bow tie. Nye Labs, the production offices and set where the show was recorded, was in a converted clothing warehouse in Seattle's Pioneer Square neighborhood. Although it focused on younger viewers, it also attracted a significant adult audience. Its ability to make science entertaining and accessible made it a popular teaching tool in classrooms. With its quirky humor and rapid-fire MTV-style pacing, the show won critical acclaim and was nominated for 23 Emmy Awards, winning nineteen. Research studies found that regular viewers were better at explaining scientific ideas than non-viewers.

In addition to the TV show, Nye published several books as The Science Guy. A CD-ROM based on the series, titled Bill Nye the Science Guy: Stop the Rock!, was released in 1996 for Windows and Macintosh by Pacific Interactive. Nye's Science Guy personality is also prominent at Walt Disney Parks and Resorts—most notably his appearance with Ellen DeGeneres at Ellen's Energy Adventure, an attraction that ran from 1996 to 2017 at the Universe of Energy pavilion at Epcot at Walt Disney World. Nye's Science Guy character was also heard in a voice-over in the queue for the DINOSAUR attraction at Disney's Animal Kingdom, and was the on-air spokesman for the Noggin television network in 1999.

==== The Eyes of Nye ====
Following the success of Bill Nye the Science Guy, Nye began work on a comeback project, The Eyes of Nye, aimed at an older audience and tackling more controversial science topics such as genetically modified food, global warming and race. However, "shifting creative concepts, infighting among executives and disputes over money with Seattle producing station KCTS significantly delayed production for years. KCTS was hampered by budgetary problems and couldn't produce a show pilot on time. "KCTS went through some distress", Nye recalled. "When we did The Eyes of Nye, the budget started out really big, and by the time we served all these little problems at KCTS, we had a much lower budget for the show than we'd ever had for the 'Science Guy' show which was made several years earlier."

PBS declined to distribute The Eyes of Nye, and it was eventually picked up by American Public Television. "PBS wanted more serious, in-depth Nova-style shows", explained co-producer Randy Brinson. The show, which eventually premiered in 2005, lasted only one season. Nye acknowledged that omitting his bow tie on the program was a mistake. "I tried wearing a straight tie. It was nothing", Nye said. "We were trying something new. It wasn't me."

==== Subsequent series ====
Nye hosted the short-form series Why with Nye for NASA TV in the early 2010s, a series discussing the Juno mission to Jupiter.

On August 31, 2016, Netflix announced that Nye would appear in a new series, Bill Nye Saves the World, which premiered on April 21, 2017. Its third and final season was released on May 11, 2018. His next series, The End is Nye, was ordered by Peacock in March 2021. Teaming up with Seth MacFarlane and Brannon Braga, the series has Nye exploring natural and unnatural disasters, explaining them scientifically to detail surviving, mitigating, and preventing them. It premiered on August 25, 2022, with six episodes.

=== Media appearances ===
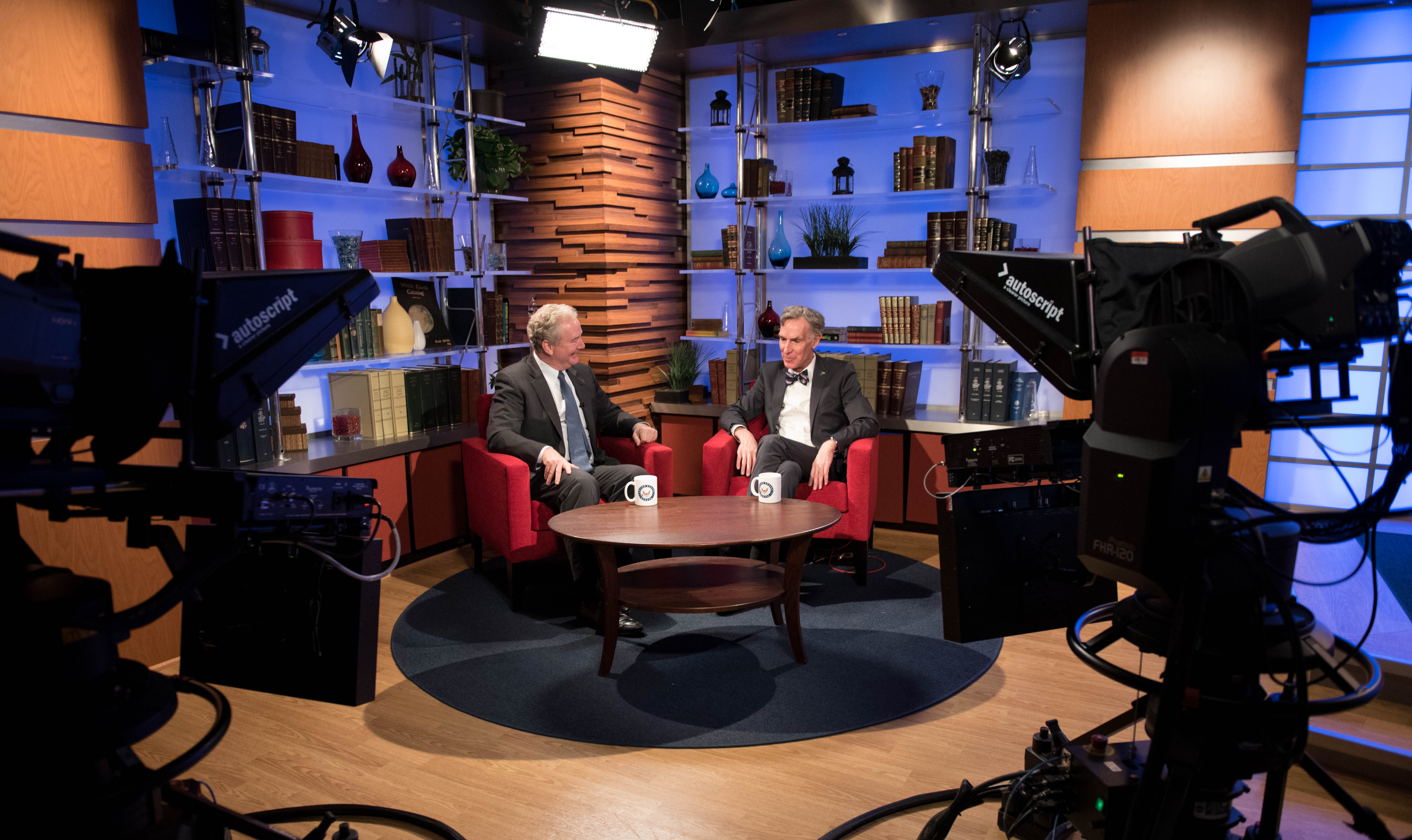
Nye with Senator Chris Van Hollen in 2017

From 2000 to 2002, Nye was the technical expert on BattleBots. In 2004 and 2005, he hosted 100 Greatest Discoveries, an award-winning series produced by THINKFilm for the Science Channel, broadcast in high definition on the Discovery HD Theater network. In 2007, he also hosted an eight-part Discovery Channel series, Greatest Inventions with Bill Nye.

A lecture Nye gave on getting children excited about math inspired the creation of the crime drama Numb3rs, where Nye appeared in several episodes as an engineering professor. On October 28, 2007, he also made guest appearances on the VH1 reality show America's Most Smartest Model.

Nye appeared on segments of Heidi Cullen's The Climate Code, later renamed Forecast Earth on The Weather Channel, relating his personal ways of saving energy. In the fall of 2008, he appeared periodically on the daytime game show Who Wants to Be a Millionaire as part of its "Ask the Expert" feature.

In 2008, Nye hosted Stuff Happens, a short-lived show on the Planet Green network. In November 2008, he portrayed himself in the fifth-season episode "Brain Storm" of Stargate Atlantis, alongside fellow television personality and astrophysicist Neil deGrasse Tyson.

In October 2009, Nye recorded a short YouTube video (as himself, not his TV persona) advocating clean-energy climate-change legislation, on behalf of Al Gore's Repower America campaign. He joined the American Optometric Association in a multimedia advertising campaign to persuade parents to provide their children with comprehensive eye examinations.

Nye was a contestant in season 17 of Dancing with the Stars in 2013, partnered with new professional dancer Tyne Stecklein. They were eliminated early in the season after Nye sustained an injury to his quadriceps tendon on Week 3.

In 2013, Nye guest-starred in The Big Bang Theory episode "The Proton Displacement". In the episode, Sheldon Cooper befriends Nye and brings him in to teach Leonard Hofstadter a "lesson" after Professor Proton (played by Bob Newhart) helps Leonard with an experiment instead of Sheldon. Professor Proton accuses Bill Nye of making his TV series similar to Proton's show. After Nye and Sheldon leave, Leonard receives a selfie of the two having smoothies, and later gets a text from Sheldon asking for a ride home, as Nye has ditched him at the smoothie store. In a later discussion with Professor Proton, Sheldon reveals that Nye had a restraining order against him, so he could not help him contact Nye.

On February 28, 2014, Nye was a celebrity guest and interviewer at the White House Student Film Festival.

Nye appeared in the 2016 documentary Food Evolution, directed by Academy Award-nominated director Scott Hamilton Kennedy and narrated by Neil deGrasse Tyson.

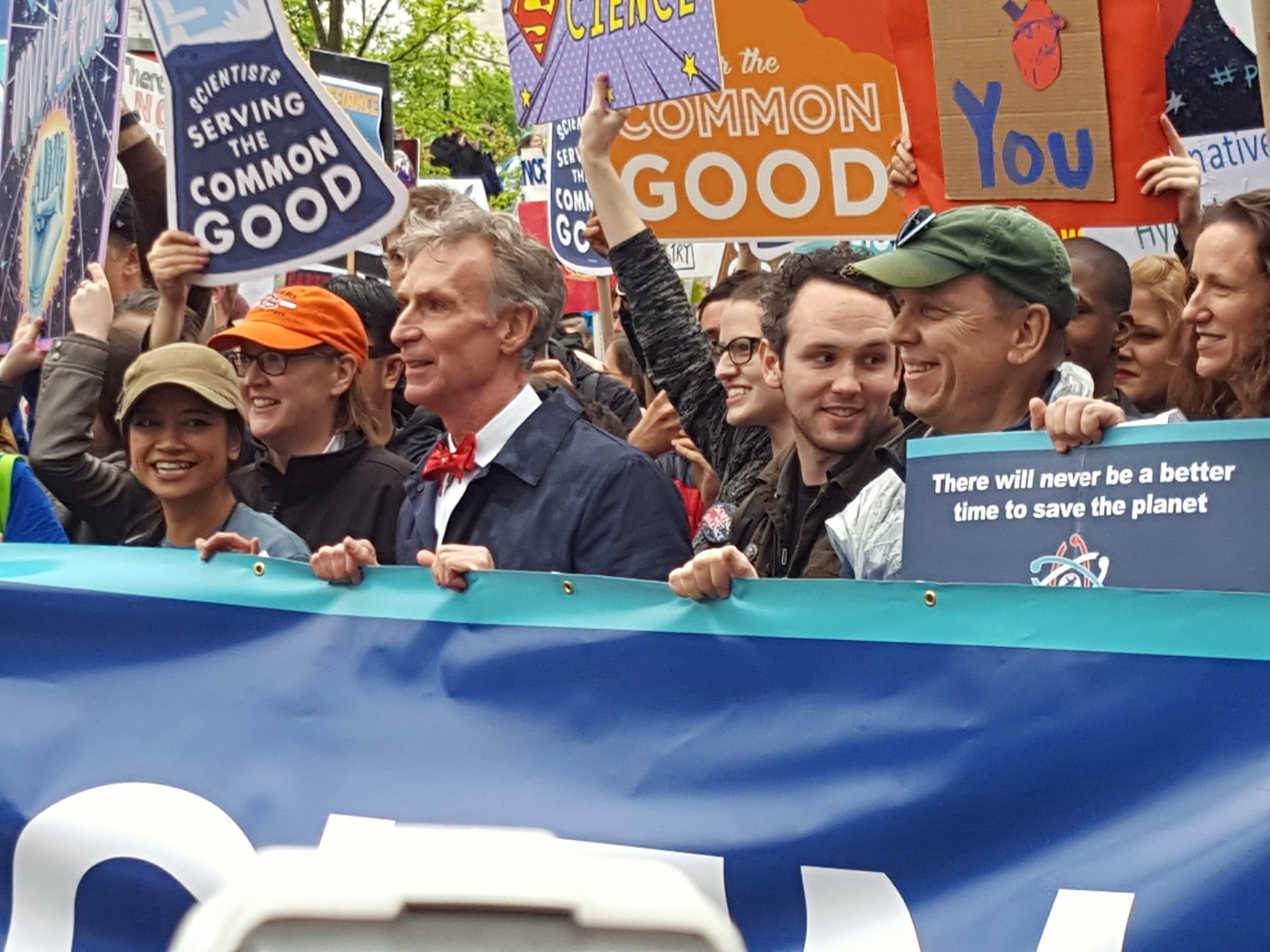
Nye at the March for Science in Washington, D.C., on April 22, 2017

In 2017, he was the subject of a biographical documentary film, Bill Nye: Science Guy, directed by David Alvarado and Jason Sussberg. Nye was honorary co-chair of the inaugural March for Science on April 22, 2017.

In 2018, Nye guest-starred in an episode of Blindspot, "Let It Go", playing a fictionalized version of himself who is the father of the character Patterson. Nye's fictional self also alludes to his rivalry with Rodney McKay, which was established in the aforementioned "Brain Storm" episode of Stargate Atlantis. Also in 2018, Nye made a second guest appearance on The Big Bang Theory as himself, together with fellow scientist Neil deGrasse Tyson, in the first episode ("The Conjugal Configuration") of the show's final season.

In September 2019, Nye was a guest on Episode 127 of Jonathan Van Ness's podcast Getting Curious, where they discussed climate change, the failures of cold fusion, the potential of better battery technology for storage of energy produced by wind turbines and solar panels, the benefits of and forthcoming improvements to electric vehicles, and the detriment and failures of fossil fuel and nuclear energy, measures toward water cleanliness, the role of girls' and women's education in improving the environment, and the threat the Trump administration posed to the environment and to scientific thought in general. That same year, Nye's vocals were featured on the closing track "Noble Gas" from electronic music producer Steve Aoki's album Neon Future III.

Nye also voiced himself in the animated feature Happy Halloween, Scooby-Doo! He portrayed Upton Sinclair in the 2020 biopic Mank.

Nye later competed on The Masked Singer spinoff The Masked Dancer as "Ice Cube".

== Science advocacy ==
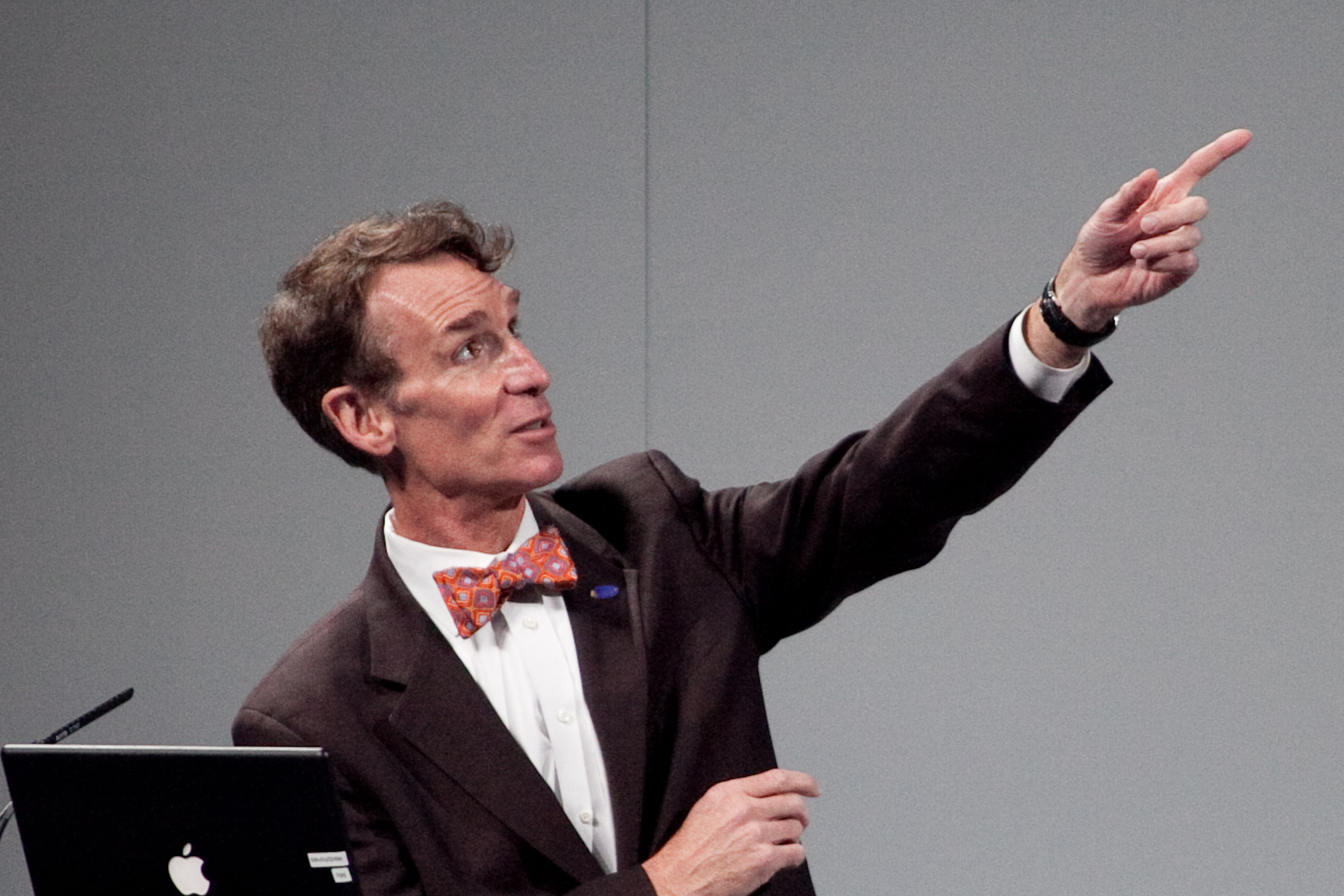
Nye orating in October 2010

In the early 2000s, Nye assisted in the development of a small sundial included in the Mars Exploration Rover missions. Known as MarsDial, in addition to tracking time, it had small colored panels to provide a basis for color calibration. From 2005 to 2010, Nye was the vice president of The Planetary Society, an organization that advocates space science research and the exploration of other planets, particularly Mars. He became the organization's second Executive Director in September 2010 when Louis Friedman stepped down. On his 15th anniversary as CEO, the organization announced Nye was stepping down and transitioning into two new roles as Vice Chair of the Board of Directors and the newly created role of Chief Ambassador.

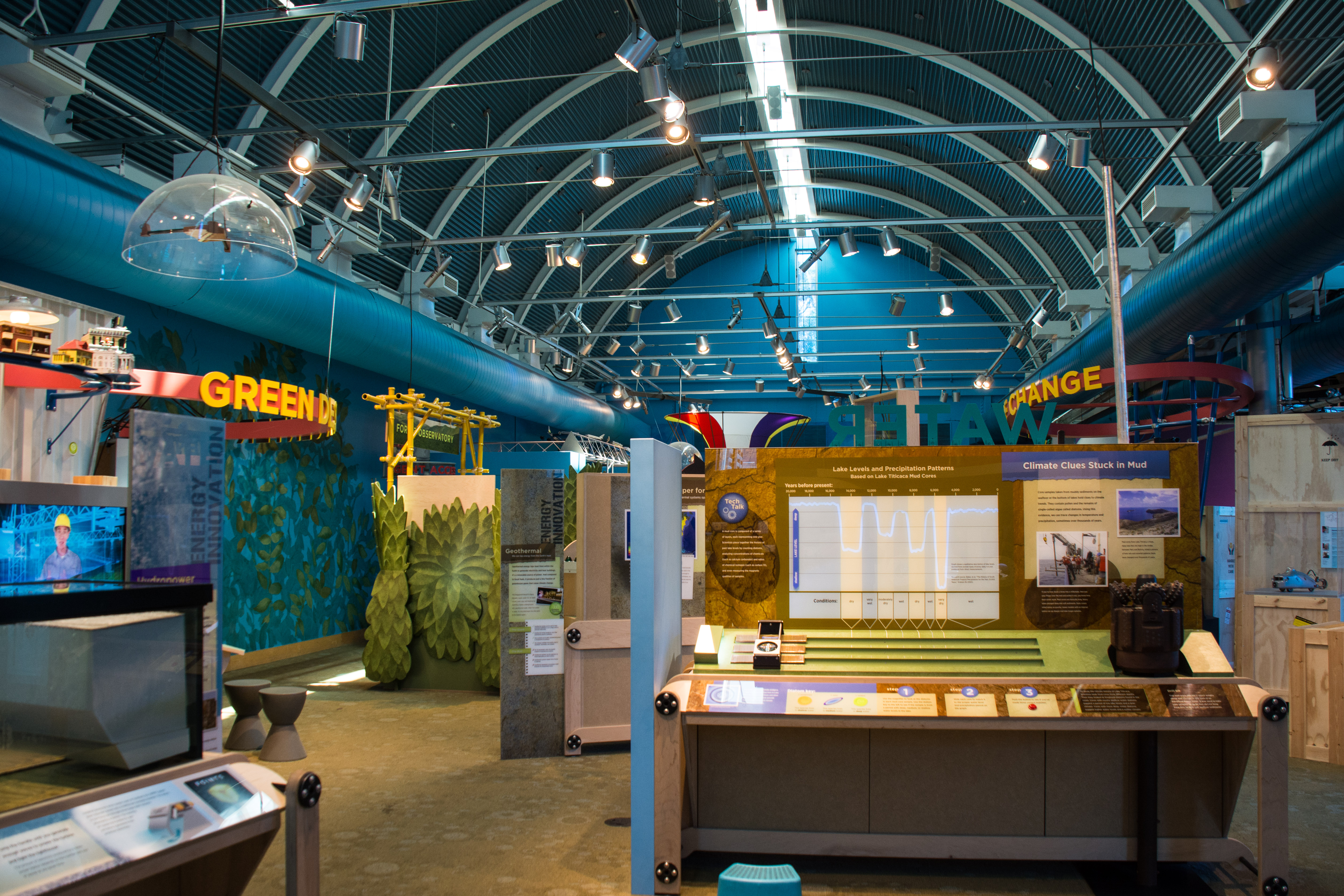
The Bill Nye Climate Lab at the Chabot Space & Science Center in 2013

In November 2010, Nye became the face of a major science exhibition at the Chabot Space & Science Center in Oakland, California. Bill Nye's Climate Lab featured him as commander of the Clean Energy Space Station and invited visitors on an urgent mission to thwart climate change.

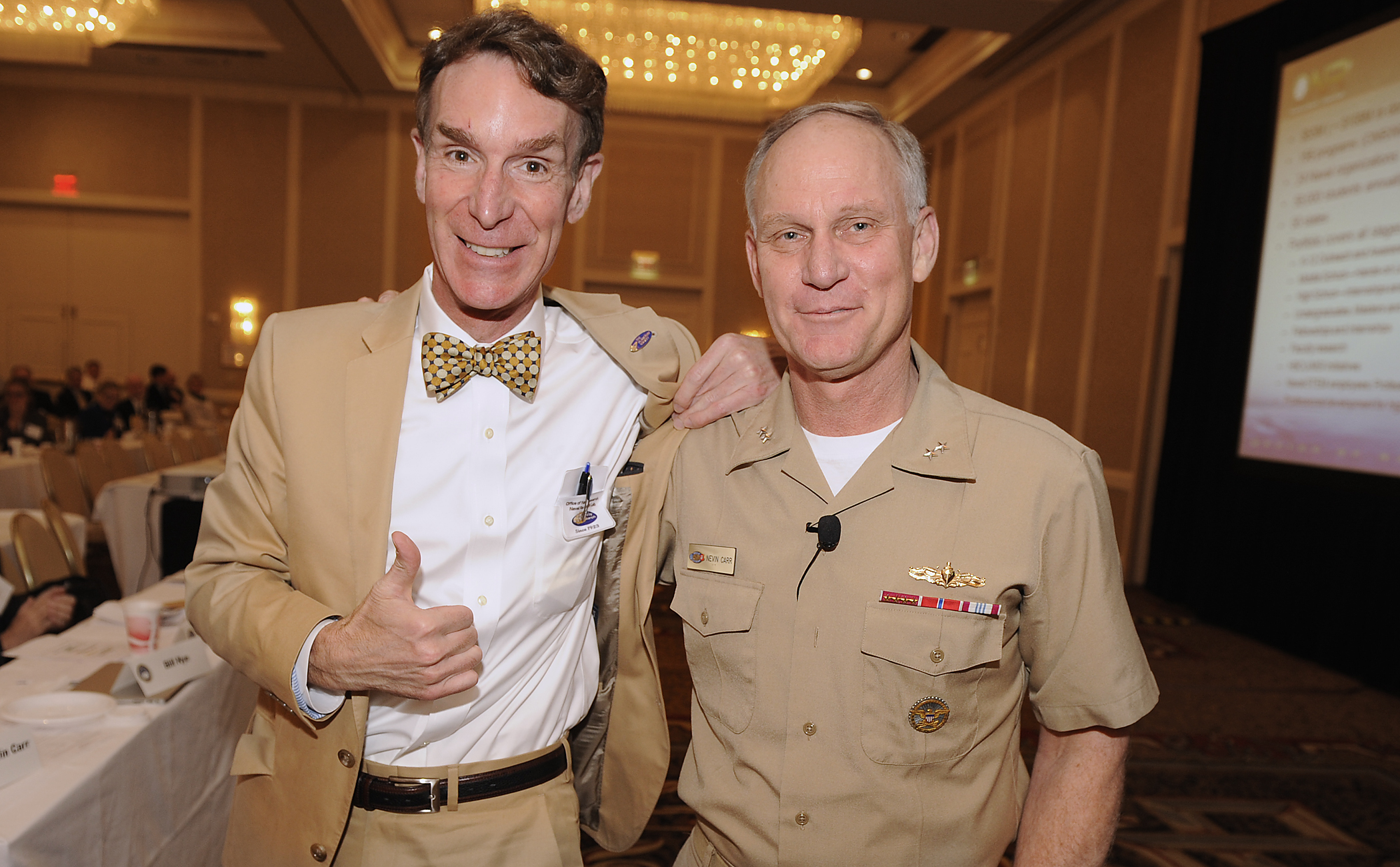
Nye with the Chief of Naval Research Rear Admiral Nevin Carr following the presentation of a "Powered by Naval Research" pocket protector during the Navy Office of General Counsel Spring 2011 Conference

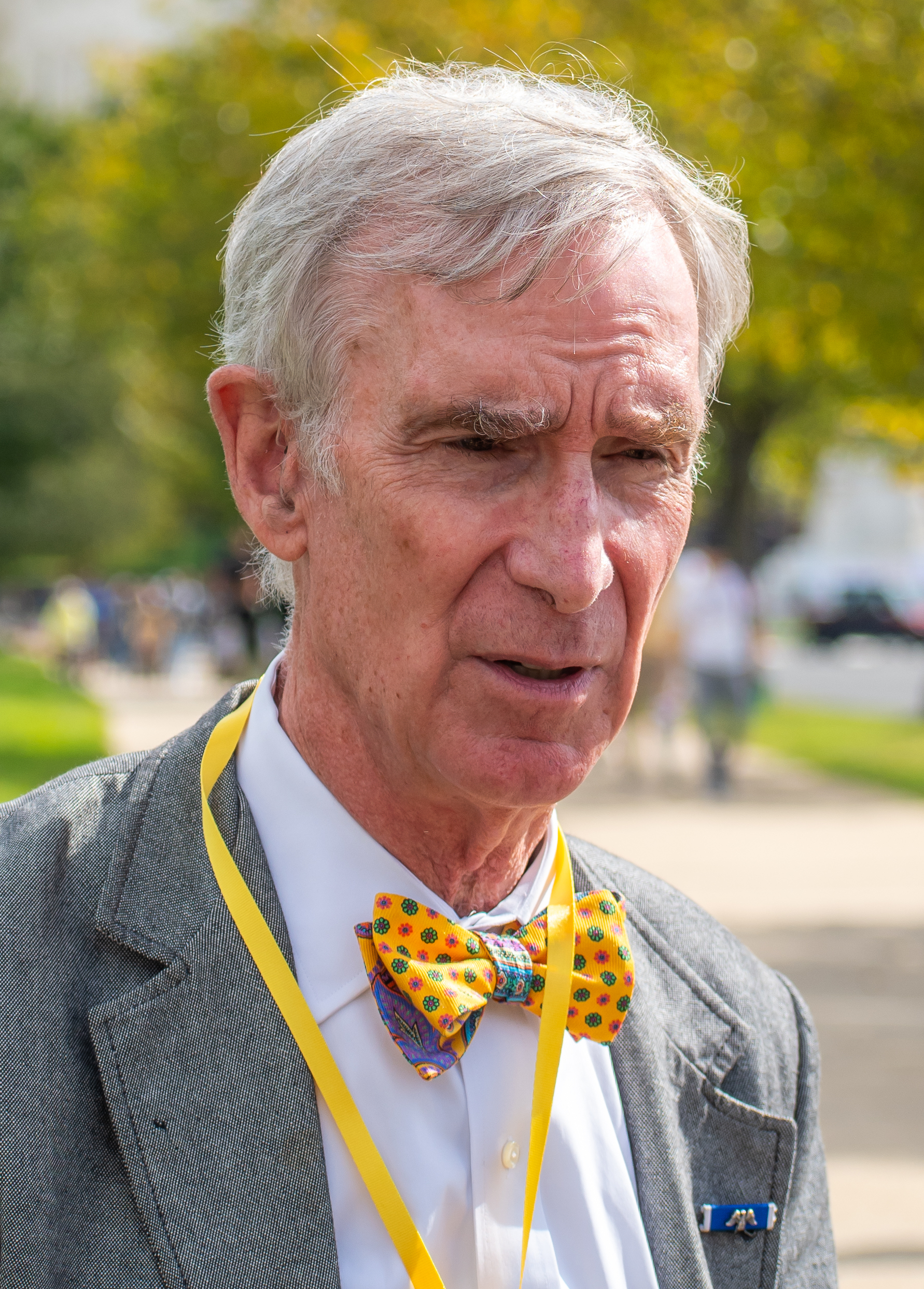
Bill Nye at No Kings in Washington, D.C., October 18, 2025

From 2001 to 2006, Nye served as Frank H. T. Rhodes Class of '56 University Professor at Cornell University.

On August 27, 2011, Nye gave a public lecture at Cornell University that filled its 715-seat Statler Auditorium. He spoke of his father's passion for sundials and timekeeping, his time at Cornell, his work on the sundials on the Mars rovers, and the story behind the Bill Nye Solar Noon Clock, which he then presented to the university atop Rhodes Hall.

Nye conducted a Q&A session after the 2012 Mars Rover landing.

Nye is a fellow of the Committee for Skeptical Inquiry, a U.S. nonprofit scientific and educational organization that promotes scientific inquiry, critical investigation, and the use of reason in examining controversial and extraordinary claims. Interviewed by John Rael for the Independent Investigation Group (IIG), Nye said that his "concern right now ... [is] scientific illiteracy ... you [the public] don't have enough rudimentary knowledge of the universe to evaluate claims." In November 2012, he launched a Kickstarter campaign for an educational aerodynamics game called AERO 3D, but it was not funded.

In September 2012, Nye claimed that creationist views threatened science education and innovation in the United States. In February 2014, he debated creationist Ken Ham at the Creation Museum on whether creation is a viable model of origins in today's modern, scientific era. In July 2016, Ham gave Nye a tour of the Ark Encounter the day after it first opened to the public. He and Ham had an informal debate while touring the structure, and footage from Nye's visit was subsequently included in the documentary film Bill Nye: Science Guy, released in 2017.

Since 2013, Nye has been a member of the Advisory Council of the National Center for Science Education.

On Earth Day 2015, Nye met with U.S. President Obama to visit Everglades National Park in Florida and discuss climate change and science education.

In March 2015, Nye announced he changed his mind and now supported GMOs. In a new edition of Undeniable: Evolution and the Science of Creation, Nye rewrote a chapter on GMOs reflecting his new position. In a radio interview with Neil deGrasse Tyson, he said, "There's no difference between allergies among GMO eaters and non-GMO eaters ... I've changed my mind about genetically modified organisms."

In July 2017, Nye observed that the majority of climate change deniers are older people, and said: "So we're just going to have to wait for those people to 'age out', as they say." He has continued to advocate against climate denial. On Last Week Tonight with John Oliver on May 12, 2019, he discussed climate change and the proposed Green New Deal, and said:

Here, I've got an experiment for you—safety glasses on. By the end of this century, if emissions keep rising, the average temperature on Earth could go up another 4 to 8 degrees. What I'm saying is the planet's on fucking fire. There are a lot of things we could do to put it out. Are any of them free? No, of course not—nothing's free, you idiots. Grow the fuck up. You're not children anymore. I didn't mind explaining photosynthesis to you when you were 12, but you're adults now and this is an actual crisis. Got it? Safety glasses off, motherfuckers.

— Bill Nye, Last Week Tonight with John Oliver, May 12, 2019, Business Insider

== Personal life ==
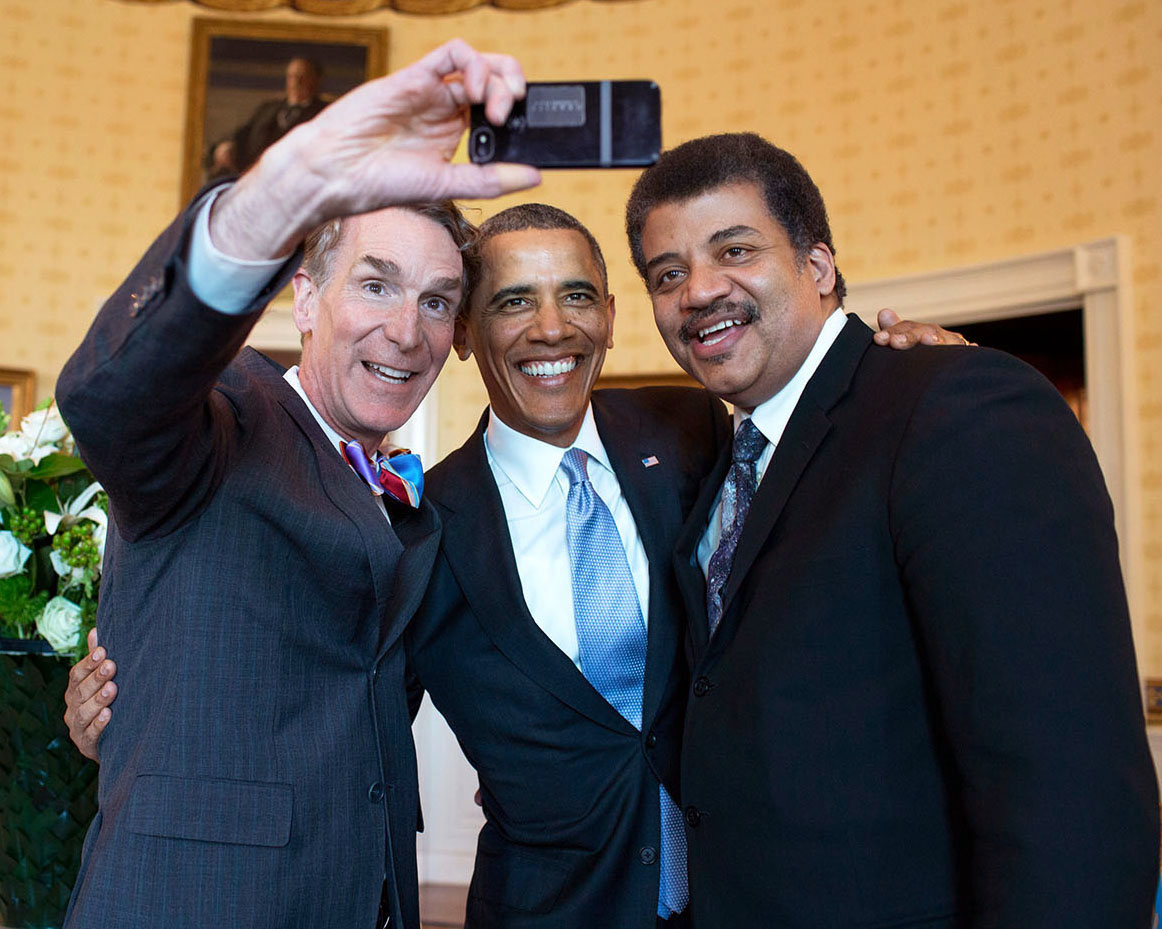
Nye taking a selfie with Barack Obama and Neil deGrasse Tyson in 2014

Nye has residences in the Studio City neighborhood of Los Angeles, in New York City, and on Mercer Island near Seattle. His California house is solar-powered, and often feeds extra power back into the public power grid, something he enjoys showing visitors.

Nye and his neighbor, environmental activist/actor Ed Begley Jr., have engaged in a friendly competition "to see who could have the lowest carbon footprint", according to Begley. Nye often appeared on Begley's HGTV/Planet Green reality show Living with Ed.

Nye has been an active swing dancer since his 20s.

In July 2012, Nye supported President Barack Obama's reelection bid. He frequently consulted with Obama on science matters during Obama's presidency, and famously took a selfie with him and Neil deGrasse Tyson at the White House. Nye attended the 2018 State of the Union Address after being invited by Oklahoma Congressman Jim Bridenstine. Nye's attendance drew scrutiny due to Bridestine's "history of expressing climate change skepticism", but Nye defended him: "While the Congressman and I disagree on a great many issues, we share a deep respect for NASA and its achievements and a strong interest in the future of space exploration. My attendance tomorrow should not be interpreted as an endorsement of this administration, or of Congressman Bridenstine's nomination, or seen as an acceptance of the recent attacks on science and the scientific community." Nye endorsed Jay Inslee during the 2020 Democratic primaries, until Inslee suspended his campaign on August 21, 2019. On October 28, 2020, Nye took to Twitter endorsing Joe Biden for president, urging his followers to vote on behalf of climate change and science. In October 2025, Nye addressed the No Kings protest in Washington, D.C., declaring, “no thrones, no crowns, no kings!”

Nye married musician Blair Tindall on February 3, 2006; however, he annulled the relationship seven weeks later when the marriage license was declared invalid. In 2007, Nye obtained a restraining order against Tindall after she broke into his house and stole several items, including his laptop computer, which she used to send defamatory emails impersonating Nye, and damaged Nye's garden with herbicide. Tindall acknowledged killing the plants but denied being a threat to Nye. Nye subsequently sued Tindall for $57,000 in attorney's fees after she allegedly violated the protective order.

In the 2017 PBS documentary Bill Nye: Science Guy, Nye discussed his family history of ataxia. Due to his father's, sister's and brother's lifelong struggles with balance and coordination, Nye decided to not have children to avoid the chance of passing on the condition, even though he "dodged the genetic bullet" himself.

Nye is a member of two trade unions.

In 2022, Nye married journalist Liza Mundy and resides in the Georgetown neighborhood of Washington, D.C.

== Published works ==
Nye has written over a dozen books in his career, including:

- Bill Nye the Science Guy's Big Blast of Science (1993)
- Bill Nye the Science Guy's Consider the Following: A Way Cool Set of Science Questions, Answers, and Ideas to Ponder (1995)
- Bill Nye the Science Guy's Big Blue Ocean (1999)
- Bill Nye the Science Guy's Great Big Dinosaur Dig (2002)
- Bill Nye the Science Guy's Great Big Book of Tiny Germs (2005)
- Bill Nye the Science Guy's Great Big Book of Science - featuring Oceans and Dinosaurs (2005)
- Nye, B. (2014). Undeniable: Evolution and the Science of Creation. New York: St. Martin's Press. ISBN 978-1250007131.
- Nye, B. (2015). Unstoppable: Harnessing Science to Change the World. New York: St. Martin's Press. ISBN 978-1250007148.
- Nye, B. (2017). Everything All at Once: How to Unleash Your Inner Nerd, Tap into Radical Curiosity and Solve Any Problem. Emmaus, Pennsylvania: Rodale Books. ISBN 978-1623367916.
- Jack and the Geniuses at the Bottom of the World (2017)
- Jack and the Geniuses Lost in the Jungle (2017)
- Jack and the Geniuses in the Deep Blue Sea (2018)
- Bill Nye's Great Big World of Science (2020)

Also:

- Time magazine has interviewed him for "12 Questions with Bill Nye".
- Nye was the guest editor of Skeptical Inquirer for the 250th issue, January/February 2025 and wrote an introduction for the special section on climate change.

== U.S. patents ==
Nye holds three United States patents: one for ballet pointe shoes, one for an educational magnifying glass created by filling a clear plastic bag with water, and one for a device for training an athlete to throw a ball. He also holds a design patent for a digital abacus.

== Awards and honors ==
In May 1999, Nye was the commencement speaker at Rensselaer Polytechnic Institute where he was awarded an honorary doctor of science degree. He received honorary doctorates from Johns Hopkins University in May 2008, and in May 2011 from Willamette University. In May 2015, Rutgers University awarded him an honorary doctor of science degree and paid him a $35,000 speaker's fee for presenting the ceremony's keynote address. Nye also received an honorary doctor of pedagogy degree during a commencement ceremony at Lehigh University on May 20, 2013. He received the 2010 Humanist of the Year Award from the American Humanist Association. In October 2015, Nye was awarded an honorary doctorate of science from Simon Fraser University. In 2011, the Committee for Skeptical Inquiry (CSICOP) gave Nye their highest award, In Praise of Reason. On behalf of the committee, Eugenie Scott stated: "If you think Bill is popular among skeptics, you should attend a science teacher conference where he is speaking—it is standing room only ... No one has more fun than Nye when he is demonstrating principles of science." In 1997, CSICOP also presented Nye with the Candle in the Dark Award for his "lively, creative ... endeavor." In 2024, Nye was awarded a star on the Hollywood Walk of Fame. On January 4, 2025, Nye was awarded the Presidential Medal of Freedom by President Joe Biden.

National

Presidential Medal of Freedom, United States (January 4th, 2025)
