= Nye Lubricants =

Manufacturer of industrial lubricants

Nye Lubricants, Inc.
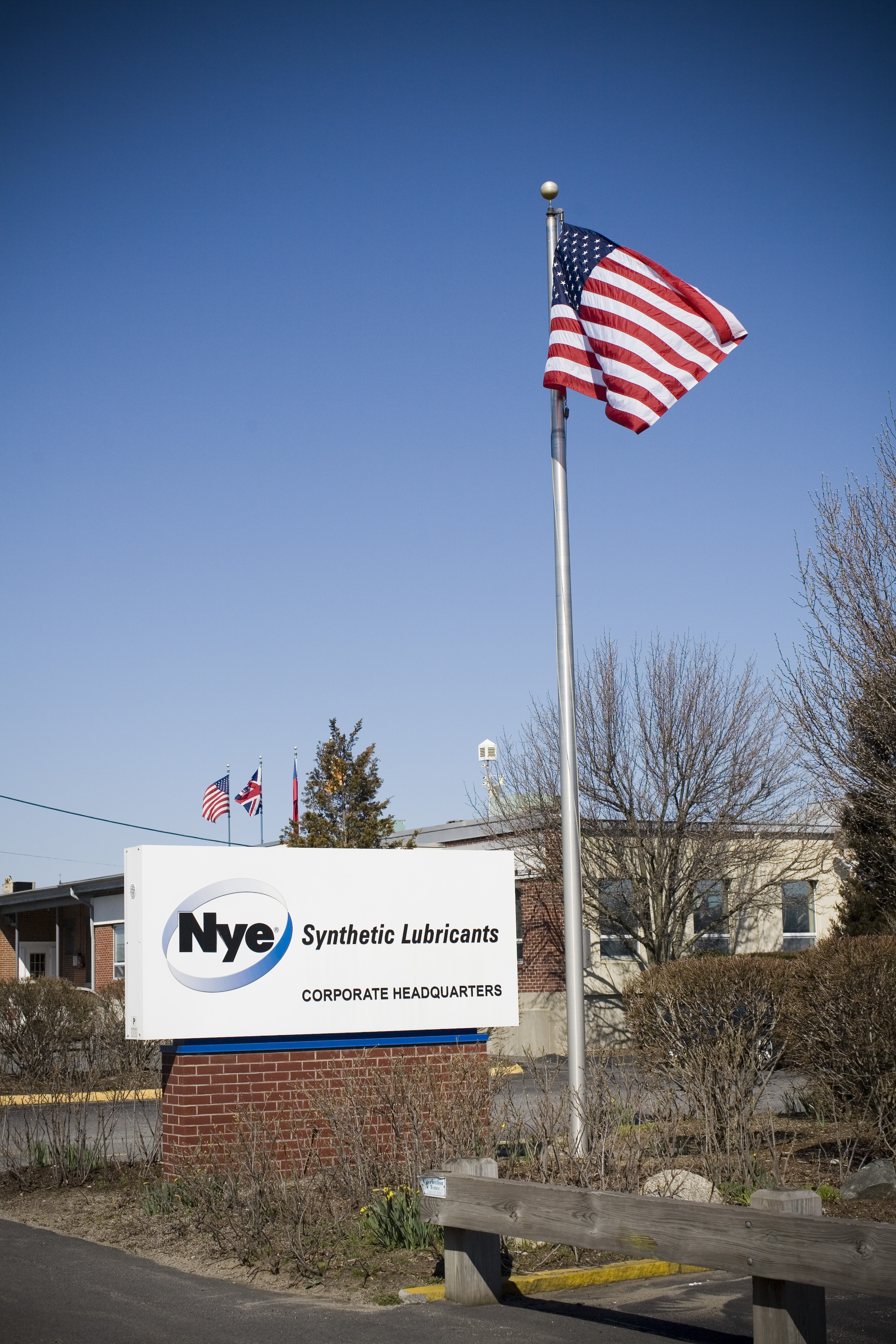
- Founded: 1844; 182 years ago
- Headquarters: Fairhaven, Massachusetts, US
- Products: Synthetic lubricants
- Number of employees: About 130
- Website: Official website

Nye Lubricants, Inc. is a manufacturer of industrial lubricants. It formulates, manufactures, and sells synthetic lubricants, thermal coupling compounds, index-matching optical gels, and fluids. Nye supplies the automotive, computer printer, disc drive, mobile appliance, aerospace, defense, and HB-LED OEM markets. The company also manufactures industrial maintenance lubricants for incidental food contact, high temperature, and other extreme environments.

== History ==
Nye traces its origins to 1844 in New Bedford, Massachusetts. As the whaling industry's center, New Bedford proved an ideal location to start an oil and lubricant business, with the company initially specializing in products derived from whale oil.

The company was founded by William Foster Nye, whose company is still in business today. Nye Lubricants, Inc is now owned by its third set of owners, and has its headquarters in William Nye's hometown of Fairhaven, Massachusetts.

== Products ==
Nye's products are based on a range of synthetic chemistries, including polyalphaolefins, esters, glycols, polyphenylethers, silicones, alkylated naphthalenes, and all commercially available perfluoropolyethers (PFPE). Nye is also the exclusive global reseller of Pennzane multiplyalkylated cyclopentane fluids, oils, and greases.

== Trade association memberships ==
Nye is a corporate member of the National Lubricating Grease Institute (NLGI), the Society of Tribologists and Lubrication Engineers (STLE), and the European Lubricating Grease Institute (ELGI).

== See also ==
- Whaling in America
- Whale oil
- History of whaling
