= The Voyage that Shook the World =

- A scene from the documentary. The actor portraying Charles Darwin as a young man is on the right.
- Directed by: Steve Murray
- Written by: George Marriott; Steve Murray
- Produced by: Ben Suter; Carl Wieland
- Narrated by: Matthew O'Sullivan
- Distributed by: TVF Ltd, Fathom Media
- Release date: 2009
- Running time: 52 minutes
- Language: English

The Voyage That Shook The World is a 2009 dramatised documentary film commissioned by Creation Ministries International, a Christian Young Earth creationist organisation, and produced by Fathom Media. It was released to mark the 200th anniversary of Charles Darwin's birth and the 150th anniversary of the publication of his seminal work On the Origin of Species.

The film includes interviews with scholars, academics and scientists covering a wide range of views. These include some who accept the scientific consensus on evolution as well as proponents of intelligent design and young Earth creationism. It features wild-life footage from the Galapagos Islands as well as on-location footage from Argentina, Chile, Tierra del Fuego and the United Kingdom. The film's dramatised sequences were shot on location in Tasmania, Australia.

A historian featured in the film has stated that the creationist backing of the film had been concealed when he agreed to take part, that the editing of his words could give a false impression of his views, and that the film presents a historically distorted portrait of Darwin. Creation Ministries agreed that they had set up a "front company" to approach experts. They denied any deception and stated that one of the interviewees had admitted that while the producers choose comments they "didn't distort what we said", and compared their approach to that used by the BBC in making documentaries.

The three historians featured in the film subsequently issued a statement that they had been misrepresented by the film company's selective reconstruction of Darwin's voyage. CMI countered these claims with extended quotes from the interviews of the historians. Their response was described as appearing to be sound in specific aspects by American skeptic Jim Lippard, who had not seen the film at that time. Having seen the film, he described it as trying to hide its own creationism, which becomes increasingly apparent as the film progresses.

== Reviews ==
Ted Baehr on Movieguide, a conservative Christian website offering film reviews, gave the movie four stars and called the film "a beautifully produced program" that shows the flaws and "anti-Christian" attitudes in Darwin's work, but is done "with dignity and respect". Baehr asserted that many of Darwin's ideas "now prove unscientific", and concluded that "if people watch it with an open mind, it may turn their hearts and minds away from the confusion that is Darwinism toward asking the right questions that can lead them to the truth." As of 21 July 2009, this was the only review cited on the film's website.

A statement by the three historians featured in the film says that it is "clearly intended to challenge evolution, but stops short of openly endorsing the more extreme alternatives favored by some creationists." They described it as being highly critical of Charles Lyell's uniformitarianism and featuring geologists who point to evidence of limited catastrophes in Earth history, but said that "it does not imply that the whole geological record is the product of a single flood." They state that the reconstruction of Darwin's life is used to give the overall impression that he "had an enquiring mind but was led astray by his theoretical preconceptions, a view backed up through interviews with several scientists, including one who expresses open doubts about evolution. The film also suggests that what is ultimately at stake is a clash of world views rather than the resolution of scientific questions." They recommended websites for information on the history of Darwin and evolution; the Darwin Correspondence Project and the National Center for Science Education, both of which have sections on science and religion, and the National Science Foundation's "Evolution of Evolution" report featuring interviews with historians of science.

=== Review by Jim Lippard ===
In his review of the film, Jim Lippard described it as professionally produced with excellent cinematography and high-quality graphics and effects. He had no criticism of the acting, which is mostly shown as visual effects during voice-overs of interviews or narration. As a documentary it starts reasonably, though putting unusual emphasis on Darwin "making up stories" as a child, and has the professional historians as the first experts shown. Lippard thought the film veered into creationist areas when discussing the influence of Charles Lyell's uniformitarianism. Though science has now fully confirmed that the Earth is about 4.5 billion years old, historian Peter Bowler is shown saying that its great age was a settled question in Darwin's time, but not today, and Lippard wondered if this remark had been taken out of context. In emails, Carl Wieland of Creation Ministries International and Steve Murray who directed the film advised that the remark was about the point that in Darwin's day there was nothing like the modern Young Earth creationist movement.

The film then presented as experts several people without identifying them as creationists and intelligent design advocates. Lippard thought perhaps the most deceptive aspect of the film was that these people were shown as though they were on a par with established experts, misleadingly representing their subject areas and not mentioning that two work for CMI while an intelligent design proponent is a professor at Biola University. They identified Stuart Burgess as "Design & Nature, Bristol University": Burgess, the Professor of Engineering Design and department head at Bristol University, is Lecturer and Unit Director for a 4th year course on Design and Nature about mechanical solution principles found in nature. In their emails, Wieland and Murray disclaimed any attempt to be deceptive in choice of on-screen credentials.

The creationist Emil Silvestru presents arguments for a young Earth and for catastrophic flood producing geological formations, taking as an example the Channeled Scablands, but omits evidence of the great age of the Earth. The film argues that Darwin was misled by Lyell's ideas, and presents a two-model approach in which science of the age of the Earth is contrasted with religion as the creationist view that the diversity and distribution of species evolved rapidly in the few thousand years since Noah's Flood. The film then presents creationist claims that there are limits to evolution and random mutation cannot generate new information or structures, claims at odds with the synthetic biology research of Synthetic Genomics. The film touches on claims that evolutionary views caused racism, but omits to mention religious support for racism, such as the Southern Baptist Convention being set up to promote slavery. Alvin Plantinga presents philosophical arguments against the validity of scientific evidence, and the film completely omits the overwhelming evidence supporting common descent and human evolution. The film concludes that there are opposing views of evolution and creation, and implies that religion and science are incompatible, finally stating that questions of origins and meaning in existence will not go away. Overall, Lippard thought the film was better than he had expected, and appeared to be trying to hide its own creationism.

== Controversies ==
The documentary has been criticised by the three historians featured in the film, Peter Bowler, Janet Browne, and Sandra Herbert. Bowler made his complaint known in a BBC interview, and later all three issued a statement published in the History of Science Society Newsletter. Creation Ministries International has responded to the criticisms, in the latter case with supporting extended quotes from the interviews.

=== Bowler's BBC interview ===
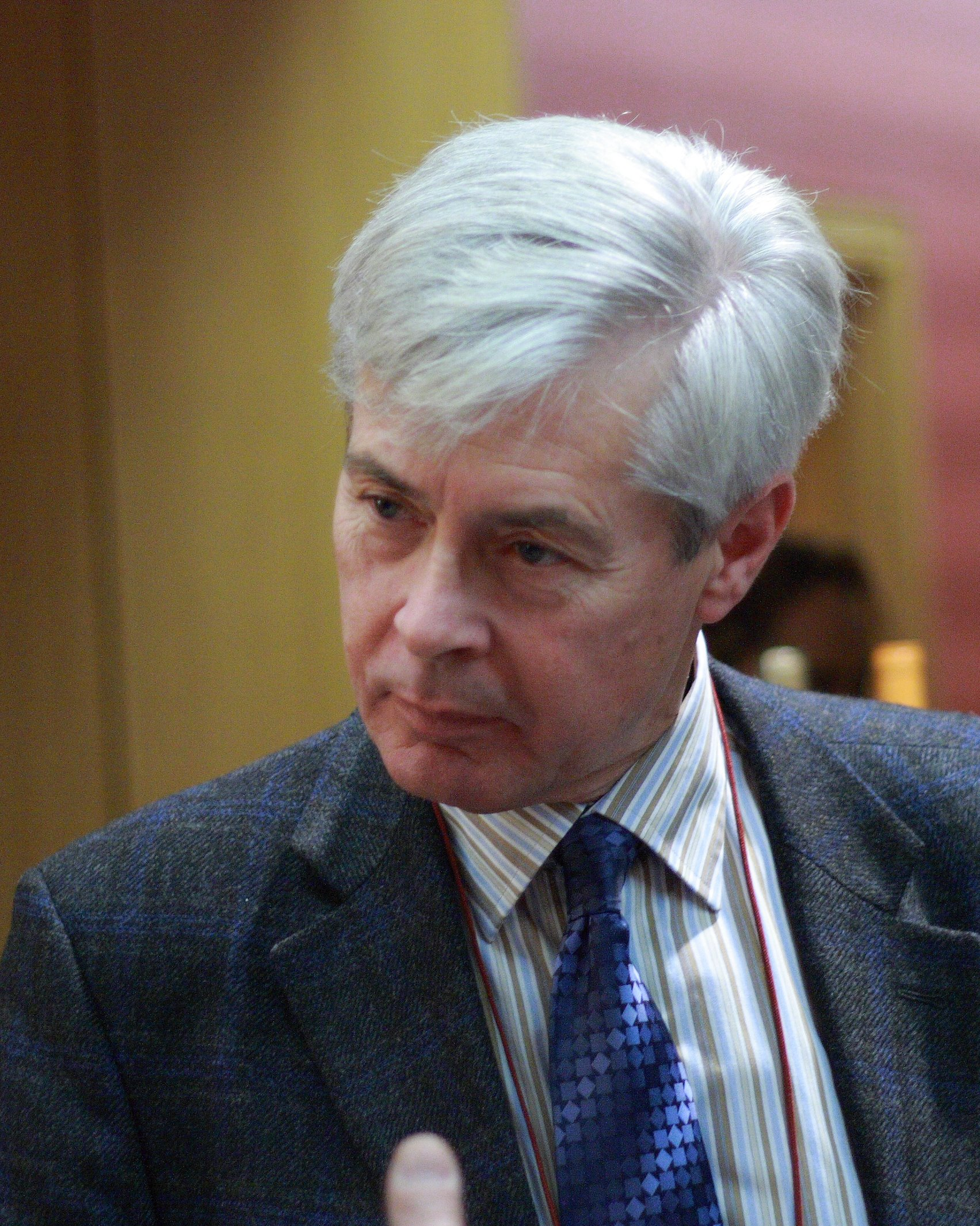
Historian of biology Peter J. Bowler felt he and the other historians were deceived.

In a BBC interview Bowler complained that he and other expert historians had been "duped" into participating in an "anti-Darwinian" film presenting a historically distorted portrait of Darwin without realising it was being produced by a creationist organisation. He claimed that the narrative of the film wrongly implies racism, contrary to current historical research, and also expressed concern that the way his words had been edited could give viewers a false impression of his own views on Darwin. In the same interview, Philip Bell, CEO of Creation Ministries UK, stated that his organisation had established a "front company" called Fathom Media for the purposes of approaching experts such as Bowler, who would not agree to take part in the film if they realised it was an "overtly Creationist" production. "At the end of the day," he said, "[when] people see 'Creationist', instantly the shutters go up and that would have shut us off from talking to the sort of experts, such as Professor Bowler, that we wanted to get to." When asked if this method of securing an interview was "deceptive", Bell replied, "Well, it could be called deceptive. But I think, at the end of the day . . . more people are concerned about how we've made a documentary, that's a world-class documentary, clearly with wonderful footage, with excellent interviews, and balanced open discussion." Bell also denied that his organisation had broken the Biblical Ninth Commandment by "bearing false witness" against Bowler and his colleagues. "Nobody was told any lies," he said.

Creation Ministries International answered these allegations in a statement about how the film was made. This included a statement by the director, Steve Murray, and the text of the document sent to all interviewees prior to their interview. In responding to accusations of "lying by omission" it stated that in an email response to a query, an unnamed interviewee said, "They didn't actually distort what we said, but did cherry-pick the comments." The producers deny any deception and accuse their critics of being inconsistent in not criticising the BBC and other documentary producers when they do not reveal the purpose of their documentary to their interviewees when, for example, making an undercover documentary of repression behind the Iron Curtain.

There was a similar controversy over the film Expelled: No Intelligence Allowed when interviewees critical of intelligent design stated that they were misled into taking part by the film producers misrepresenting the aims of the film.

=== History of Science Society statement ===
The statement issued in the History of Science Society Newsletter said that the three historians had been misrepresented by the film company's selective reconstruction of Darwin's voyage. They said that they had been led to believe that "the movie was being made to be shown as an educational film on Australian broadcast television and possibly elsewhere", and had only been alerted to the true nature of the movie shortly before its release. They describe the interviews filmed with themselves as having been edited to highlight certain aspects of Darwin's views and character. Browne's description of Darwin's childhood delight in making up stories to impress people was "used to imply that the same motive may have driven his scientific thinking." The film uses the description of Darwin's later views on racial inequality but, the statement says, omits Bowler's account of the thesis that Darwin's work was inspired by his opposition to racism and slavery, as put forward by Adrian Desmond and James Moore. A comment by Sandra Herbert that "Darwin's theory required explanation of many aspects of life" was, the statement said, edited down to imply that his theory required explanation of all aspects of life. They stated that this opportunity to reach out to a wider public had turned out differently from their expectations, and that academics perhaps "do need to be more aware of the fact that the media organisations are not always open about their underlying agendas." While they probably would not have contributed had they known the true origins of Fathom Media, they thought that the producers had a point in that if academic historians refuse to participate when historical information is sought by organisations they disapprove of, they cannot complain if less reputable sources are used instead.

CMI has responded to these criticisms by quoting more extensive transcripts of the interviews to show that Bowler made no mention of Desmond or Moore, and that Herbert's views were not misrepresented. On Bowler's claim, they quote the director (Steve Murray) as saying, ". . . in my interview with Prof. Bowler he offered no reference at all that I or others could tell (even on re-examining the transcripts), to the work of Desmond and Moore, nor was there any statement that Darwin was inspired by his opposition to racism and slavery, or anything to that effect". In answer to Herbert's claims, Murray said, "Professor Herbert seems to imply that somehow we twisted the meaning of her words, so that 'many aspects of life' was edited to imply 'all aspects of life'. Yet where did she refer to 'many aspects of life'? We simply included what seems to be a very clear statement that Darwin had to 'explain everything!' (Implied: 'all aspects of life')"

American skeptic Jim Lippard, commenting on CMI's response before he had seen the film, said, ". . . the CMI rebuttal appears to be sound with respect to those two specific allegations." and added that prospective interviewees should do due diligence to find out who is backing the film before agreeing to appear, should check that the release gives a way of defending against misrepresentation, and if going public with feelings that they have been misrepresented, should "consult the raw footage to make sure your charges of misrepresentation are themselves accurate". Having seen the film, he thought that it started off reasonably, but deceptively presented creationists as though they had reputations on a par with well credentialed experts, and as the film went on more standard creationism began to emerge.

== Box office ==
The Voyage That Shook The World grossed $116,436 at the box office in Australia.

== See also ==
- Cinema of Australia
- Expelled: No Intelligence Allowed
