= Ark Encounter =

Christian creationist theme park located in Kentucky

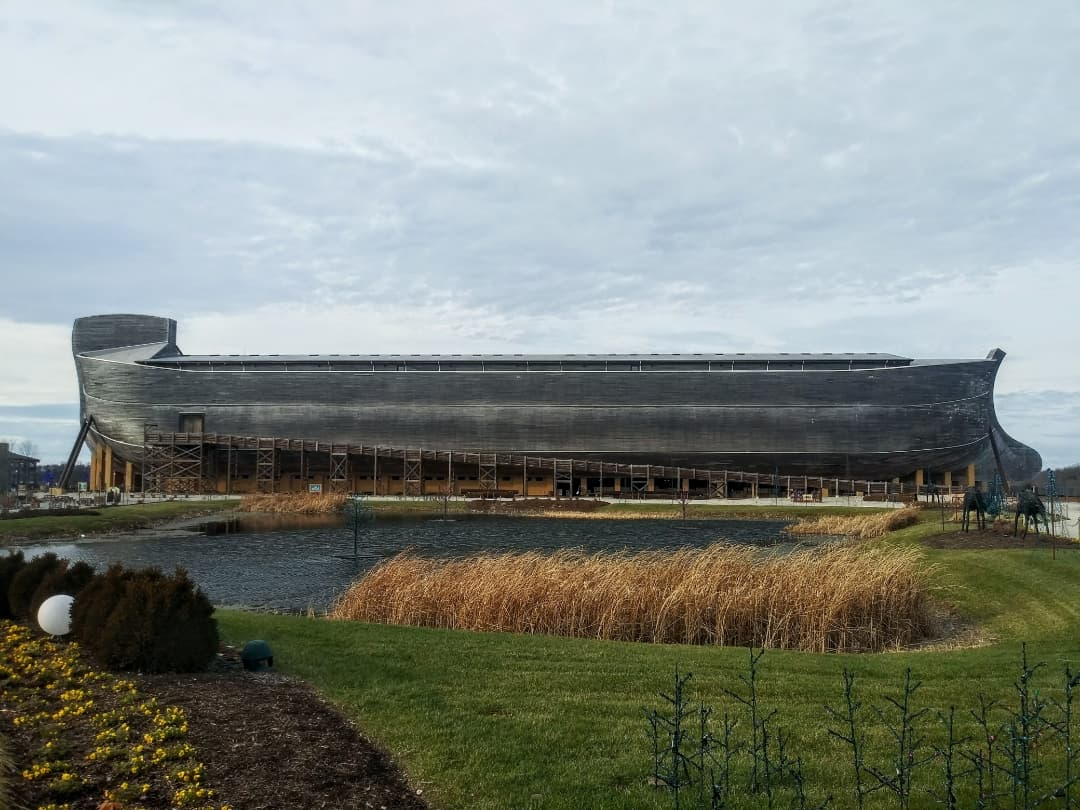
- Replica of Noah's Ark at Ark Encounter (2021)
- Interactive map of Ark Encounter
- Location: Williamstown, Kentucky, United States
- Coordinates: 38.6222°N 84.5923°W
- Status: Operating
- Opened: July 7, 2016
- Owner: Ark Encounter, LLC
- Operated by: Answers in Genesis
- Theme: Noah's Ark
- Slogan: "It's bigger than imagination"
- Operating season: Year-round
- Attendance: 862,471 – 1 million (July 2017–June 2018)
- Website: arkencounter.com

Ark Encounter is a Christian theme park that opened in Williamstown, Kentucky, United States, in 2016. The centerpiece of the park is a large representation of Noah's Ark, based on the Genesis flood narrative contained in the Bible. It is 510 feet (155.4 m) long, 85 feet (25.9 m) wide, and 51 feet (15.5 m) high.

Ark Encounter is operated by Answers in Genesis (AiG), a young Earth creationist organization that also operates the Creation Museum 45 miles (70 km) away in Petersburg, Kentucky. Australian creationist and CEO of AiG Ken Ham founded the park. The theme park promotes faith-based, pseudoscientific young Earth creationist beliefs about the age of the universe, age of the Earth, and co-existence of humans and non-avian dinosaurs.

A dispute over AiG's hiring practices was adjudicated in U.S. Federal court, which found in 2016 that the organization could require Ark Encounter employees to sign a statement of faith as a condition of their employment, prompting criticism of the park's hiring practices.

== Visitor experience ==
The ark contains 132 bays, each standing about 18 feet (5.5 m) high, arranged into three decks. Visitors enter on the lowest deck and move between decks on ramps constructed through the center of the ark. Bays on the first deck contain models of some animals that AiG believes could have been on the ark. The models are meant to represent "kinds" of animals, which AiG says gave rise to modern animals after the flood. Prior to the Ark's opening, media outlets reported it would feature models of dinosaurs and "Biblical unicorns".

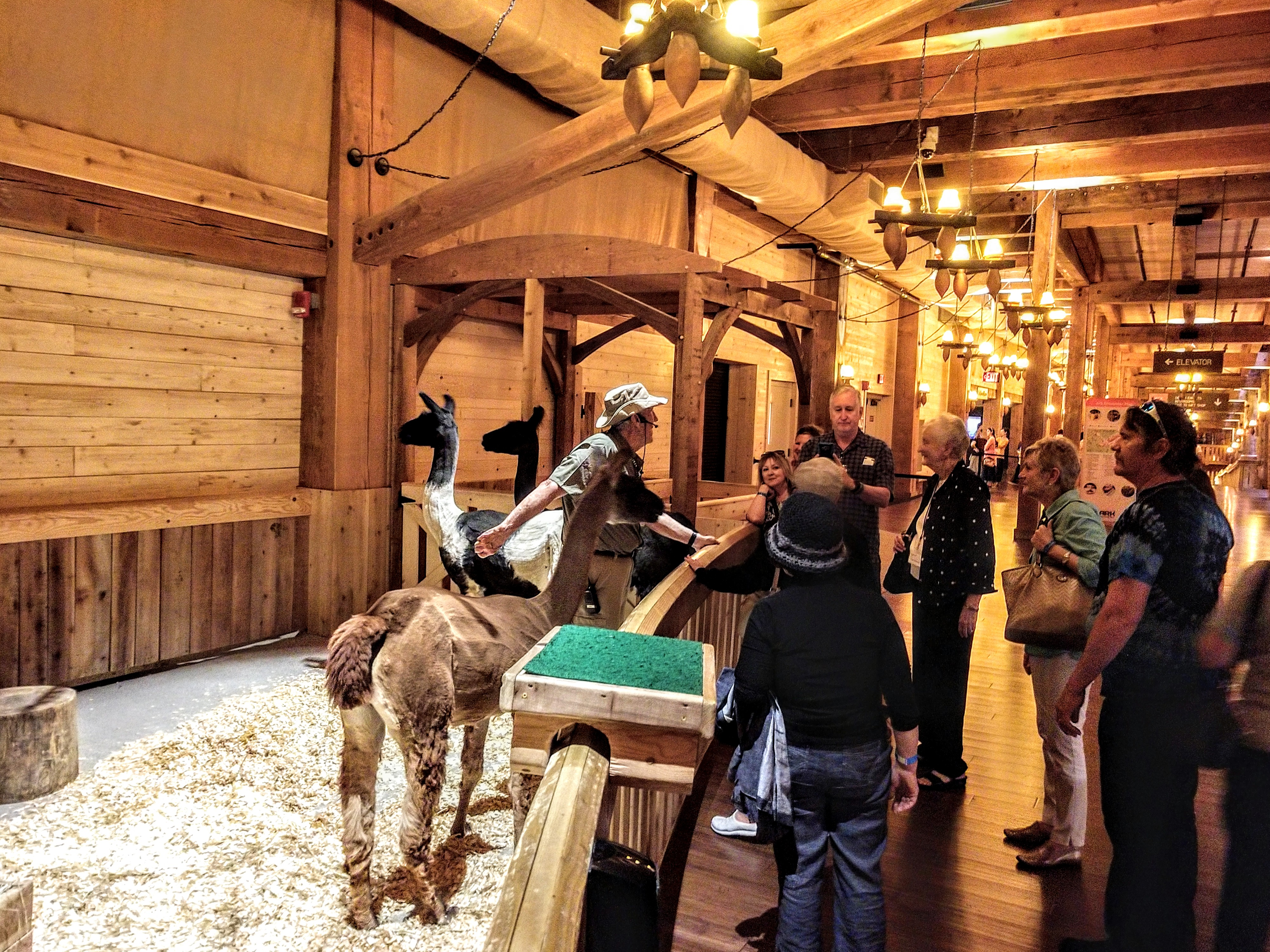
Deck 2: A live animal exhibit alternates between llamas, alpacas and donkeys from day to day.

The second deck contains more animal models, along with dioramas of Noah's workshop and a blacksmith. Bays on the third deck contain displays presenting what AiG believes might have happened inside and outside the ark during the flood. Displays in three of the bays include artifacts from the Green Collection and promote the Museum of the Bible, a Washington, D.C. attraction constructed by the Green family, who donated to the Ark Encounter's construction.

RoadsideAmerica.com rated the displays depicting the sinful state of the world before the flood, including a priest sacrificing an infant to an unnamed snake god and people fighting a giant and a dinosaur in a gladiatorial arena, as among the most memorable exhibits in the attraction. Visiting scientists, however, find the juxtaposition of humans and dinosaurs not only ridiculous, but also harmful to young guests. In an interview discussing her tour of the Ark Encounter, Bailey Harris states that, while she was impressed with the size of the attraction, she found it “all much sillier than I expected. The dinosaurs that are everywhere in displays with humans, like in the Flintstones, gets old really fast...The antiscience represented along with this magnificence is so dangerous to children...It is designed to overwhelm children with its size and beauty to then present untruths from beginning to end.”

The ark is held 15 feet (4.6 m) off the ground by a series of concrete towers. The starboard side of the hull merges into three 80-foot (24 m) masonry towers containing stairwells, elevators, and restrooms.

Besides the Ark Encounter itself, there are a handful of other attractions within the theme park, including Emzara's Kitchen, a two-story, buffet-style restaurant with a capacity of 1,500 guests, making it one of the largest restaurants in the world. The park also has ziplining and a virtual reality theater. There is also a zoo, called Ararat Ridge Zoo, on the grounds. Live animals are sometimes brought into the Ark exhibit from the zoo.

== History ==
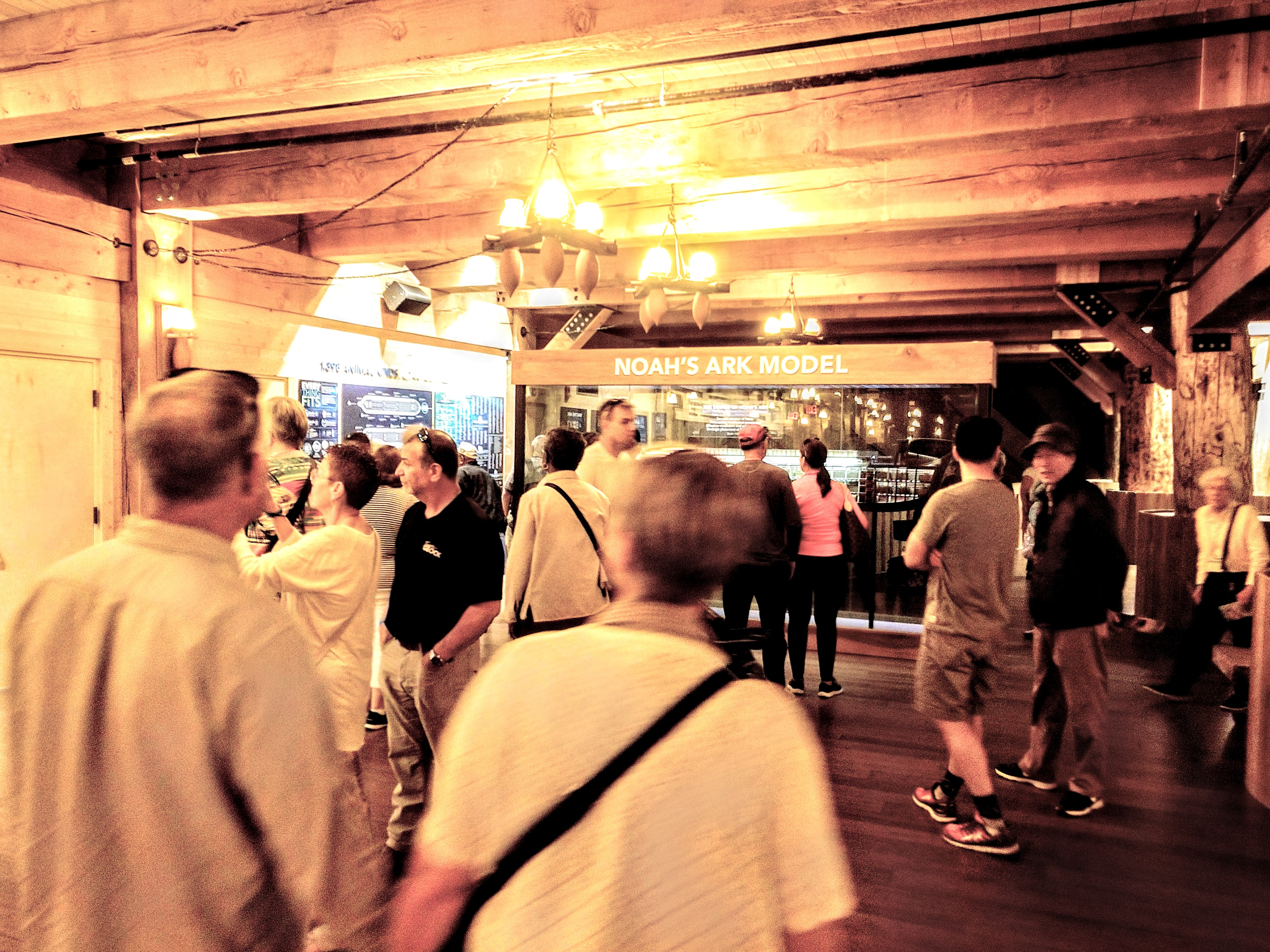
A scale model of the Ark on deck 1

=== Planning ===
On December 1, 2010, the young Earth creationism group Answers in Genesis (AiG) and the for-profit corporation Ark Encounter, LLC announced that they would partner to build a theme park called Ark Encounter that, as they claimed, would "lend credence to the biblical account of a catastrophic flood and to dispel doubts that Noah could have fit two of every kind of animal onto a 500-foot-long ark". The partners projected that the fully completed park would cost $150 million, which they intended to raise privately.

Under a program enacted by the Kentucky General Assembly in 2010, Ark Encounter investors applied for Economic Development Incentives that would allow them to recoup 25 percent of the project's construction costs by keeping a portion of the park's sales taxes during its first ten years of operation. Receipt of the incentives would be contingent upon Ark Encounter meeting established performance goals upon opening. A press release from Kentucky Governor Steve Beshear's office cited a feasibility study commissioned by Ark Encounter, LLC and conducted by consumer research corporation America's Research Group Limited, Inc.

The company had also conducted the feasibility study for AiG's Ark Encounter and an attitudinal survey included in Ken Ham's book Already Gone; ARC founder C. Britt Beemer was credited as a co-author of the book. This projected the park could employ 900 people, attract as many as 1.6 million visitors in its first year of operation, and generate a $214 million economic impact for the region. The group selected an 800-acre (320 ha) parcel near Interstate 75 in Grant County, Kentucky, near the city of Williamstown and about 45 miles (70 km) from AiG's Creation Museum in Petersburg, Kentucky.

The city of Williamstown designated a 1.25-mile (2.01 km) radius around the Ark Encounter site as a tax increment financing district, meaning 75 percent of sales and property taxes collected in the district would return to Ark Encounter for a period of 30 years. Employees working in the district would also pay a 2 percent employment tax over the same time frame that would go to the Ark Encounter.

The Grant County Industrial Development Authority paid Ark Encounter, LLC $195,000 to compensate the corporation for the fact that word of their interest in building the attraction in Grant County had leaked early, causing land prices to double in the area. Further, the Grant County Fiscal Court discounted the sale price of 100 acres (40 ha) of the site to influence the final selection.

Citing the proffered incentives, Ark Encounter, LLC made the Grant County site their final selection and scheduled groundbreaking for August 2011. Plans for additional phases of the park include a model of the Tower of Babel, along with replicas of an ancient walled city and a first-century Middle Eastern village.

=== Purchase of site ===
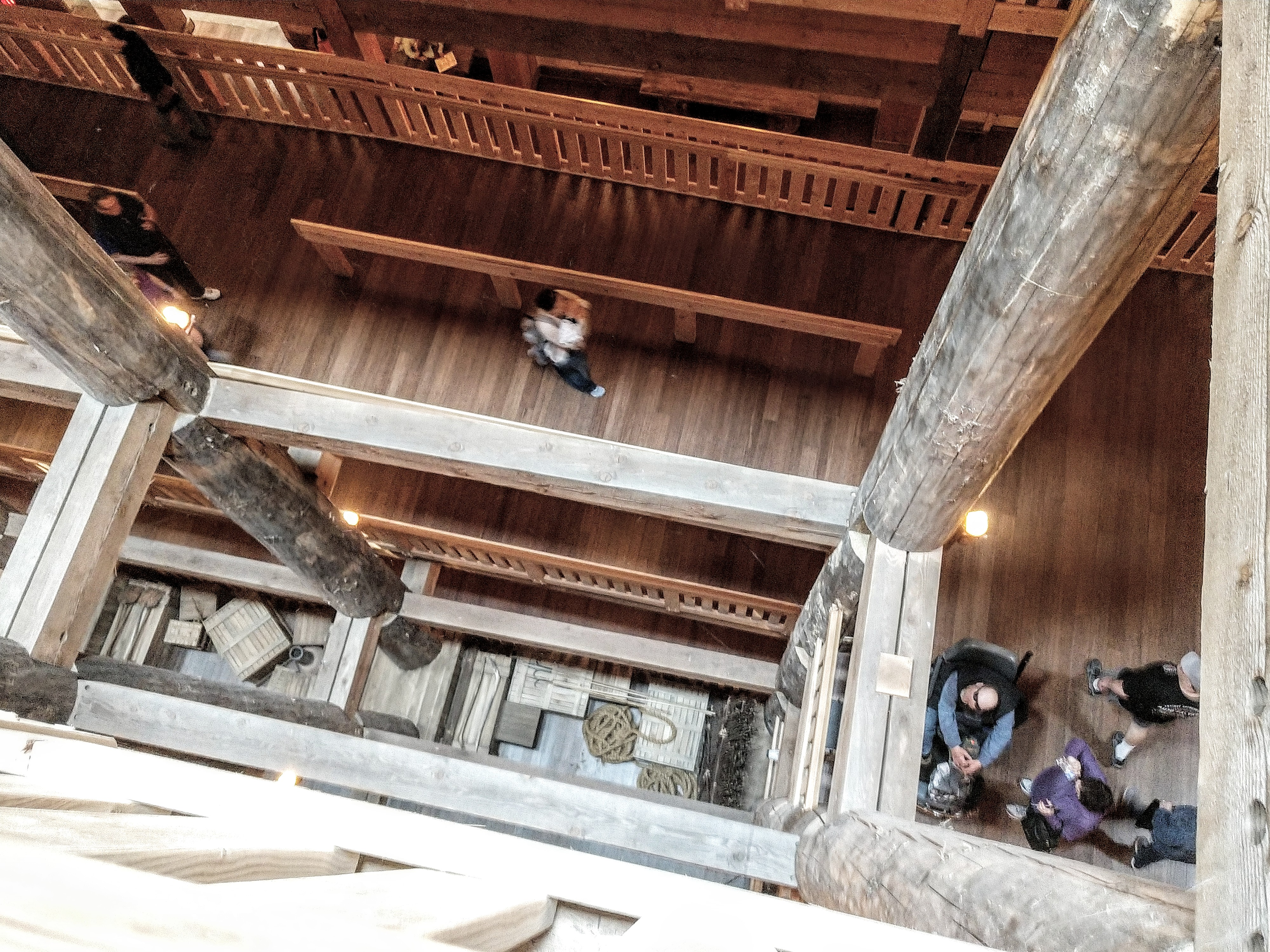
A view down middle open area

Ark Encounter, LLC finalized the purchase of the entire Ark Encounter site in February 2012. At that time, AiG announced the decision to construct the park in phases, saying it had raised only $5 million of the $24 million needed to begin construction. The first phase included a full-scale model of Noah's Ark and a petting zoo. Plans for five subsequent phases included replicas of an ancient walled city, a first-century Middle Eastern village, and the Tower of Babel; an aviary; and a 500-seat special effects theater.

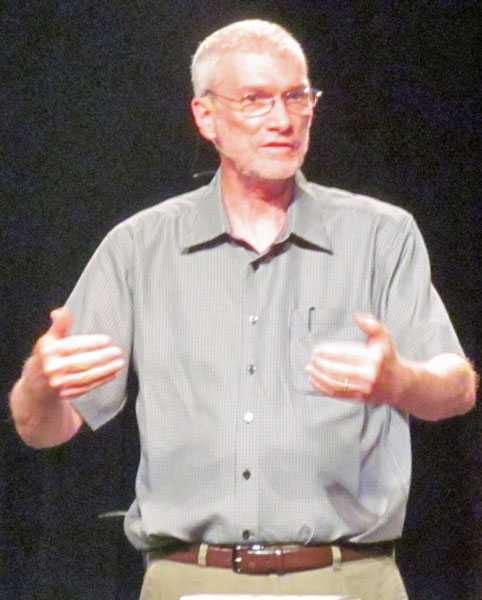
Ken Ham, the founder of Answers in Genesis, the group behind Ark Encounter

In December 2013, the city of Williamstown offered $62 million using tax increment financing of bonds to jump-start construction on the Ark Encounter. The unrated bonds were backed by the Ark Encounter's projected future revenues, but the city was not liable for repaying them in the event that the revenues did not materialize. At the time of the offering, Ark Encounter, LLC had raised approximately $14 million toward construction of the park.

A group of atheist objectors to the Ark Encounter attempted to disrupt the offering by registering for the sale themselves and conducting a public relations campaign against the bonds. In early January 2014, only $26.5 million in bonds had been sold; if at least $55 million in bonds were not sold by February 6, all of the bonds would be automatically redeemed.

On February 27, 2014, AiG founder Ken Ham announced that his February 4 debate on the viability of creationism with TV personality Bill Nye "the Science Guy" spurred bond sales, and that the Ark Encounter raised enough money to begin construction. AiG officials said the final cost of the park at its opening exceeded $100 million, including $62 million from the Williamstown bond offering and $36 million from individual donations. The second phase of the park construction was projected to commence in 2018 or 2019.

The 2014 Kentucky General Assembly allocated $1.15 million to Grant County for road improvements to accommodate the heavier traffic expected to be generated by the Ark Encounter. The Assembly also projected the need for $9.1 million in 2017 to improve the Interstate 75 interchange at Williamstown, but this allocation was beyond the scope of the state's two-year road funding plan. The 2016 General Assembly allocated $10 million to create a new interchange between Kentucky Route 36 (KY 36) and Interstate 75.

Until the improvements are completed, AiG is paying for workers to direct traffic on KY 36 near the Ark Encounter. After the initial allocation by the state, AiG invested $500,000 of its own money into improving KY 36; this, and better-than-expected traffic flow, led to the Kentucky Department of Transportation scaling back the proposed improvements, awarding a $3.5 million contract in December 2017. The project was projected to be completed November 2, 2018.

In July 2014, with the approved tax incentives set to expire if work on the park had not begun, Ark Encounter withdrew the approved application and filed a new one to receive incentives on the $73 million first phase. The new application required a new feasibility study to be conducted. AiG paid for the study, again conducted by Hunden Strategic Partners, which projected a more conservative 400,000 visitors a year, 787 new jobs, and a $40 million economic impact.

Shortly after the application was given preliminary approval by the Kentucky Tourism Development Finance Authority, Kentucky House Speaker Greg Stumbo said he believed the incentives to be unconstitutional. He added that he expected the state to be sued and lose a costly lawsuit over the issue.

=== Design and construction ===
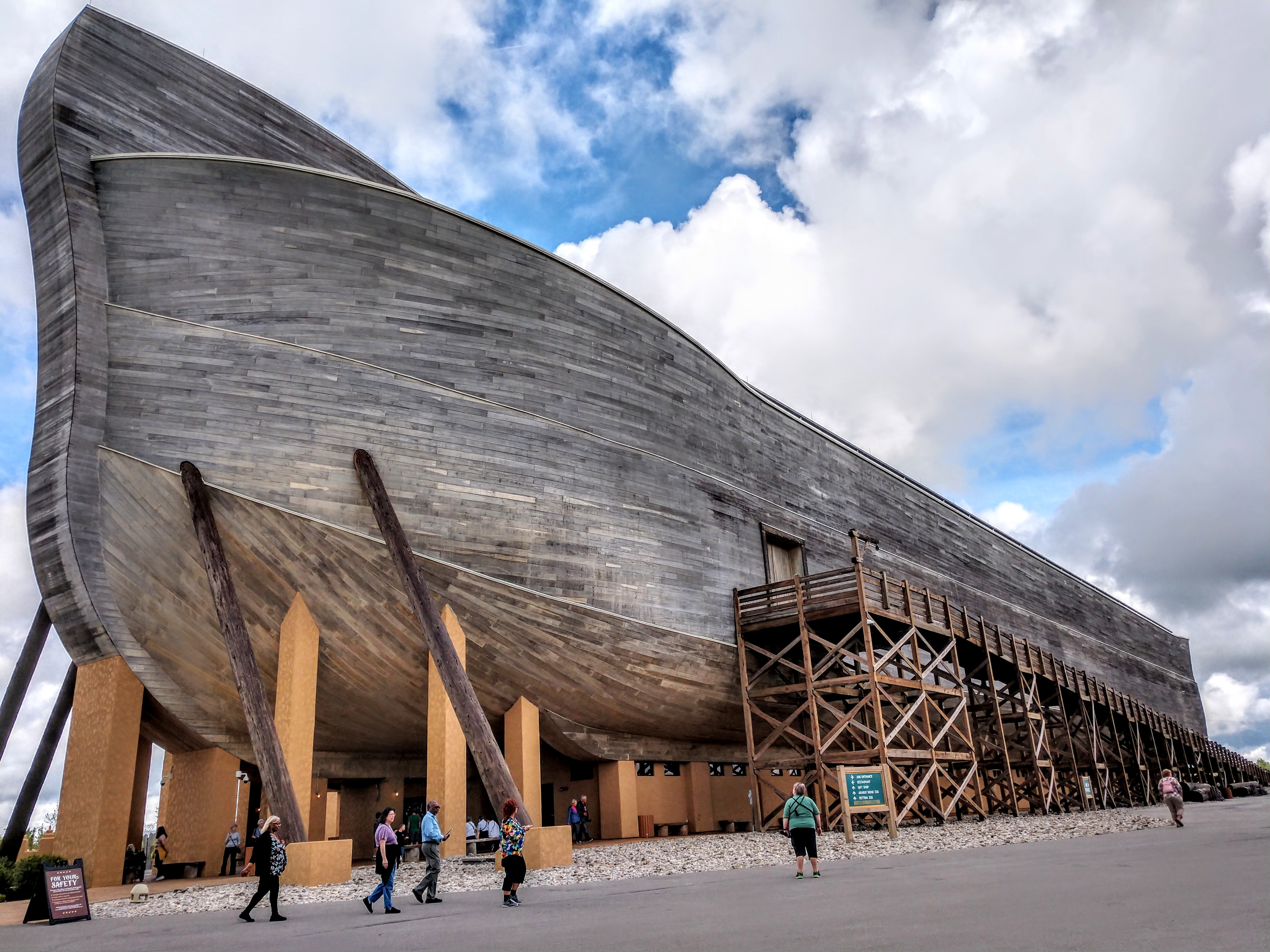
A view from near the bow of the Ark Encounter with visitors to show scale

Cary Summers, who headed Herschend Family Entertainment from 1992 to 1998, was hired as the lead consultant for the Ark Encounter. Patrick Marsh, who helped design exhibits for the Creation Museum and previously designed attractions for Universal Studios Florida, was part of the planning and design team. The Troyer Group, a construction firm in Mishawaka, Indiana, was contracted to oversee construction of the ark, which was constructed by Amish builders using traditional timber framing techniques. In total, over 1,000 craftsmen were employed in the ark's construction. As possible, board pulling was used rather than steaming. Steel nails were used to conform with building code regulations.

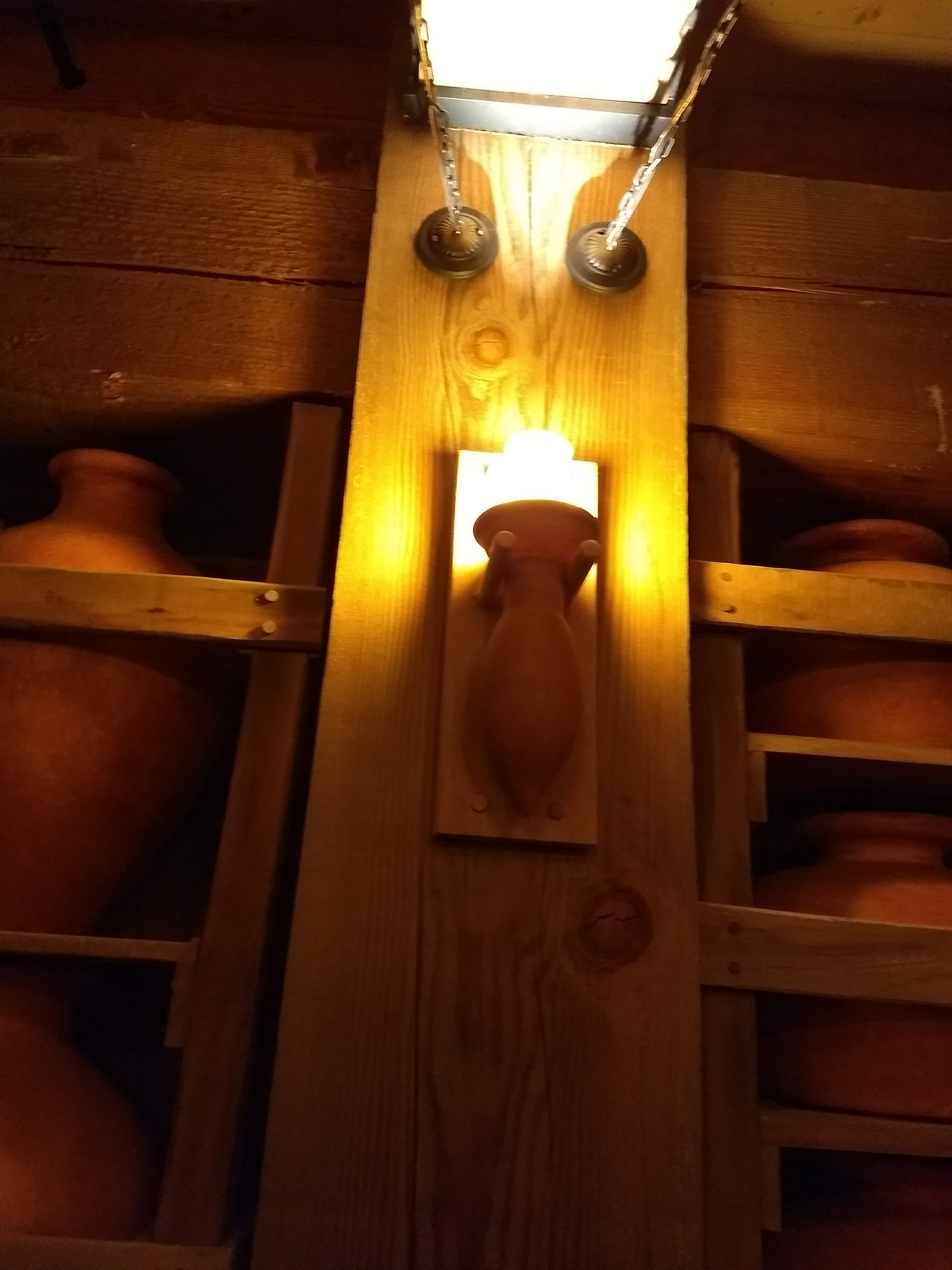
Lighting at the Ark Encounter is designed to resemble oil lamps.

While the builders originally planned to hold the ark together with wooden pegs, modern building codes required the builders to use steel fasteners, thus 95 tons of metal plates and bolts were used to connect the wood together. The electric lighting inside was designed to look like oil lamps. According to AiG, the Ark Encounter is the largest timber frame structure in the United States.

AiG considered twelve different possible lengths for the biblical cubit, and AiG chose to use a length of 20.1 inches (51 cm); this produced plans for an ark measuring 510 feet (155 m) long, 85 feet (26 m) wide, and 51 feet (16 m) high. The Ark Encounter consists of approximately 3,300,000 board feet (7,800 m^{3}) of wood. The framing of the ark consists mostly of Engelmann spruce, while the exterior is made of pine; some of the logs were as long as 50 feet (15 m) long and 36 inches (91 cm) in diameter.

The park's structures and infrastructure were constructed using environmentally friendly Leadership in Energy and Environmental Design certified methods, including geothermal heating, rainwater capture, active and passive solar heating. The Washington Post wrote that the decision to use such techniques was exemplary of "a fundamental shift in how religiously conservative Christians think of two basic biblical ideas: dominion and stewardship". Hydroponic gardens produce lettuce to feed the animals housed at the attraction's petting zoo, as well as the landscape plants for the Ark Encounter and Creation Museum.

Construction crews began clearing timber from the site late in 2012 in order to remove the shagbark hickory trees before the endangered Indiana bats migrated to the area to nest in them. Much of the wood used to build the Ark Encounter was sourced from renewable forests or trees infested by beetles. During construction, former President Jimmy Carter toured the Ark Encounter, accepting an invitation from LeRoy Troyer, president of the Troyer Group.

=== Opening ===
Ark Encounter opened on July 7, 2016, a date (7/7) chosen to correspond with Genesis 7:7: "And Noah and his sons and his wife and his sons' wives entered the ark to escape the waters of the flood." AiG also announced that, for the first 40 days and 40 nights of Ark Encounter's operation – an allusion to the inundation period (rain and subterranean hydrological eruptions) of the biblical flood – it would extend its hours of operation, offering day and evening tickets. On July 5, AiG held a ribbon-cutting ceremony for the Ark Encounter, during which members of the media and an estimated 7,000 donors to the project were given an early tour of the ark. According to the park's publicists, there were 30,000 visitors in its first six days of operation (an average of 5,000 per day).

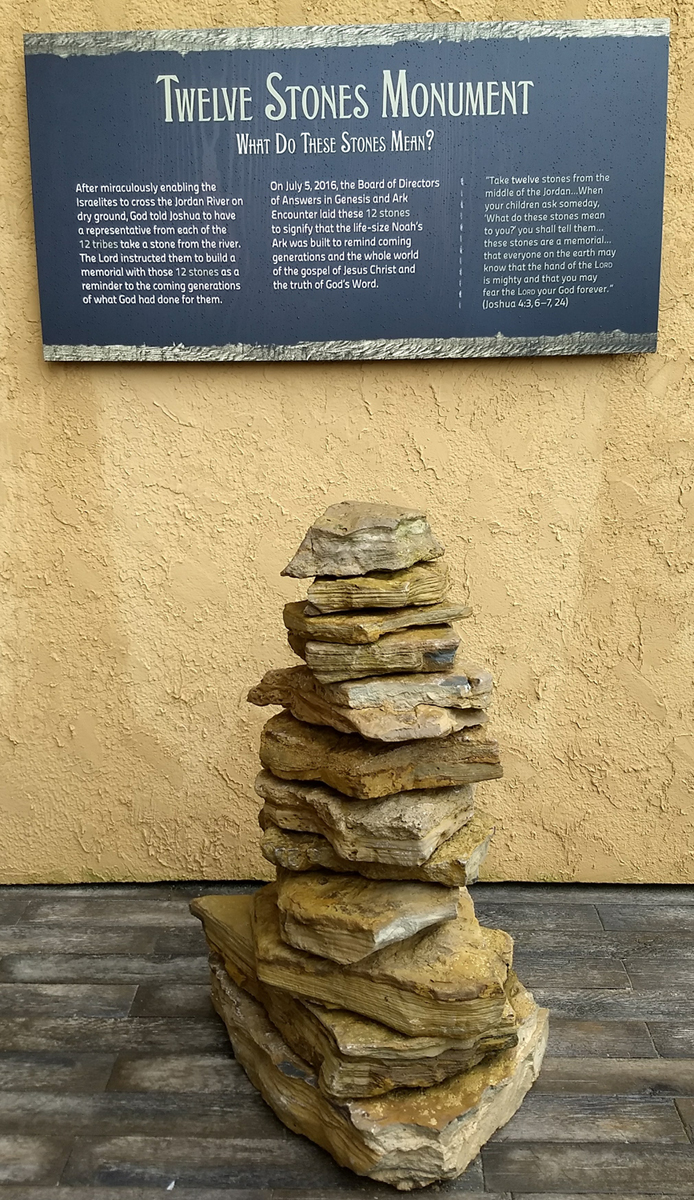
A monument erected by the AiG board of directors just prior to Ark Encounter's opening, with signage referencing a similar monument from Joshua 4

Tri-State Freethinkers planned to protest the Ark Encounter's opening with a nearby billboard depicting people drowning around Noah's Ark with the caption "Genocide and Incest Park: Celebrating 2,000 years of myths", but billboard companies Lamar Advertising Company and Event Advertising and Promotions LLC rejected the design. The Courier-Journal reported that approximately 150 opponents of the Ark Encounter gathered near the highway exit to protest the park on its opening day. Eric Hovind of Creation Today led a counter-protest during which he offered to pay for any of the ark protesters to tour the ark; the Northern Kentucky Tribune reported that 21 anti-ark protesters accepted Hovind's offer.

The next day, popular science communicator Bill Nye accepted Ken Ham's invitation to tour the Ark Encounter, and they had an informal debate as they toured the structure. Nye stated, "It's all very troubling. You have hundreds of school kids there who have already been indoctrinated and who have been brainwashed. (...) This is about the absolutely wrong idea that the Earth is 6,000 years old that's alarming to me." Earlier in the debate, Ham stated, "My biggest concern is you're teaching generations of young people that they're just animals." Footage from Nye's visit was subsequently included in the documentary film Bill Nye: Science Guy, which was released in 2017.

The Freedom From Religion Foundation, an organization that advocates for the separation of church and state, sent letters to over 1,000 public school districts in Kentucky, Tennessee, Ohio, Indiana and West Virginia warning them not to organize field trips to the Ark Encounter, arguing that such trips would "expose children to religious proselytizing in violation of the constitutional separation of church and state."

Grant County, Kentucky Education Commissioner Stephen Pruitt responded that approval of field trips is a decision of local school boards but that such trips should be directly related to curriculum. He said it is not appropriate for "outside third parties to dictate field trip selections." Contending that FFRF was incorrect in their assertion, Ham posted on his blog that he would encourage public school groups to visit the ark by offering admission of $1 per child and no charge for accompanying teachers for the remainder of 2016.

=== Subsequent events ===
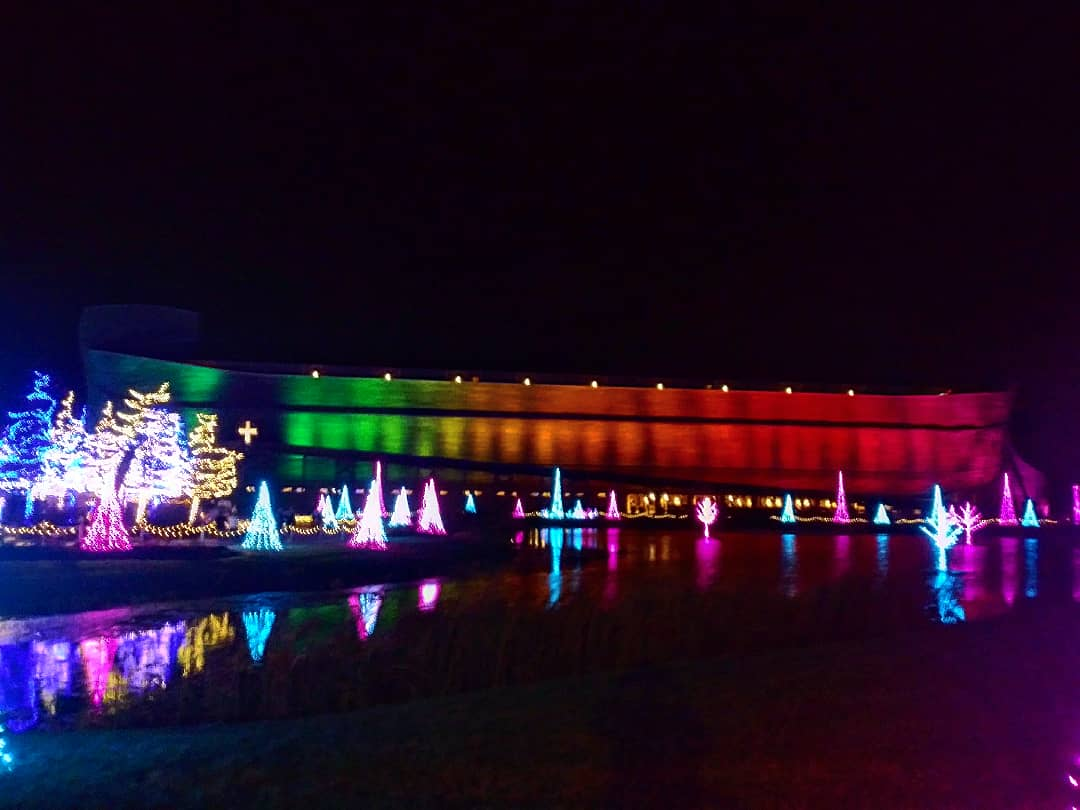
The Ark Encounter at night, December 2021

The Tri-State Freethinkers has protested annually at the Ark Encounter on the anniversary of its opening, citing its hiring practices, anti-evolution teachings, and acceptance of state tax incentives as causes for protestors' concerns. Local media coverage estimated the size of the 2018 protest to be between 120 and 200 people.

In December 2016, for the holiday season, AiG lit the Ark with rainbow colors, the purpose being to "reclaim the symbol from the gay rights movement" that had been established as a symbol in 1994 and remind viewers of the Noahic covenant. In February 2017, Ken Ham announced AiG would permanently continue the rainbow lighting. Permanent lights were installed in July 2017. AiG also plans to open a "Rainbow Garden" near the petting zoo where flowers create a rainbow display.

In November 2017, construction began on a 2,500-seat theater on the park's grounds. The theater was originally projected to be completed in time to host the "Equipping Families to Stand" conference, scheduled for July 18, 2018, but construction has been delayed, and the building was subsequently projected to open before the end of 2018. AiG also announced a new children's play area scheduled to open in spring 2019 and an expansion to the petting zoo, projected to open by mid-2019.

The Ark Encounter's dispute with the FFRF that began upon the former's opening continued, with the latter sending letters to 1,000 school districts surrounding the attraction after AiG offered free admission to school trips.

In May 2019, Ark Encounter filed a federal lawsuit against its five insurance carriers for not covering nearly $1 million in damages from roadway failure subsequent to rain. According to the lawsuit, an access road was damaged by heavy rains in 2017 and 2018, which caused a landslide. Insurance companies cited an exclusion for correcting design deficiencies or faulty workmanship. The suit asked for compensatory and punitive damages. The ark itself was not damaged in the incident, and the attraction remained open to visitors. The insurance company, Allied World, applied to separate the "breach-of-contract" claims from the "bad-faith claims" but the court rejected the request. The case was settled in August 2020 when lawyers for both sides requested that the case be dismissed. Settlement details were not made public.

Pursuant to an executive order from Kentucky governor Andy Beshear closing all non-essential businesses in the state, Ark Encounter was temporarily closed on March 17, 2020, during the COVID-19 pandemic. During the closure, AiG staff conducted events on Facebook Live, but no visitors were allowed in the park, and many of its staff members were temporarily laid off. After Beshear lit the governor's mansion with green lights as a show of solidarity and compassion for the victims of COVID-19, AiG lit the Ark Encounter green as well. Upon reopening on June 8, AiG limited the number of visitors allowed in the park to one-third of its capacity to facilitate social distancing and observed other sanitation guidelines recommended by the Commonwealth of Kentucky.

In August 2020, Ark Encounter officials announced it would host a Christian music festival the following year that would last "40 days and 40 nights." Also in August 2020, Ark Encounter opened a new $3 million virtual reality experience called the "Truth Traveler".

In July 2021, Ark Encounter announced expansion plans. These plans included a Tower of Babel attraction, an indoor scale model of what Jerusalem may have looked like during the time of Jesus, and a themed carousel. According to Ham, the Tower of Babel attraction is intended to confront racism by showing that humanity is descended from a common ancestor (monogenism).

== In the media ==
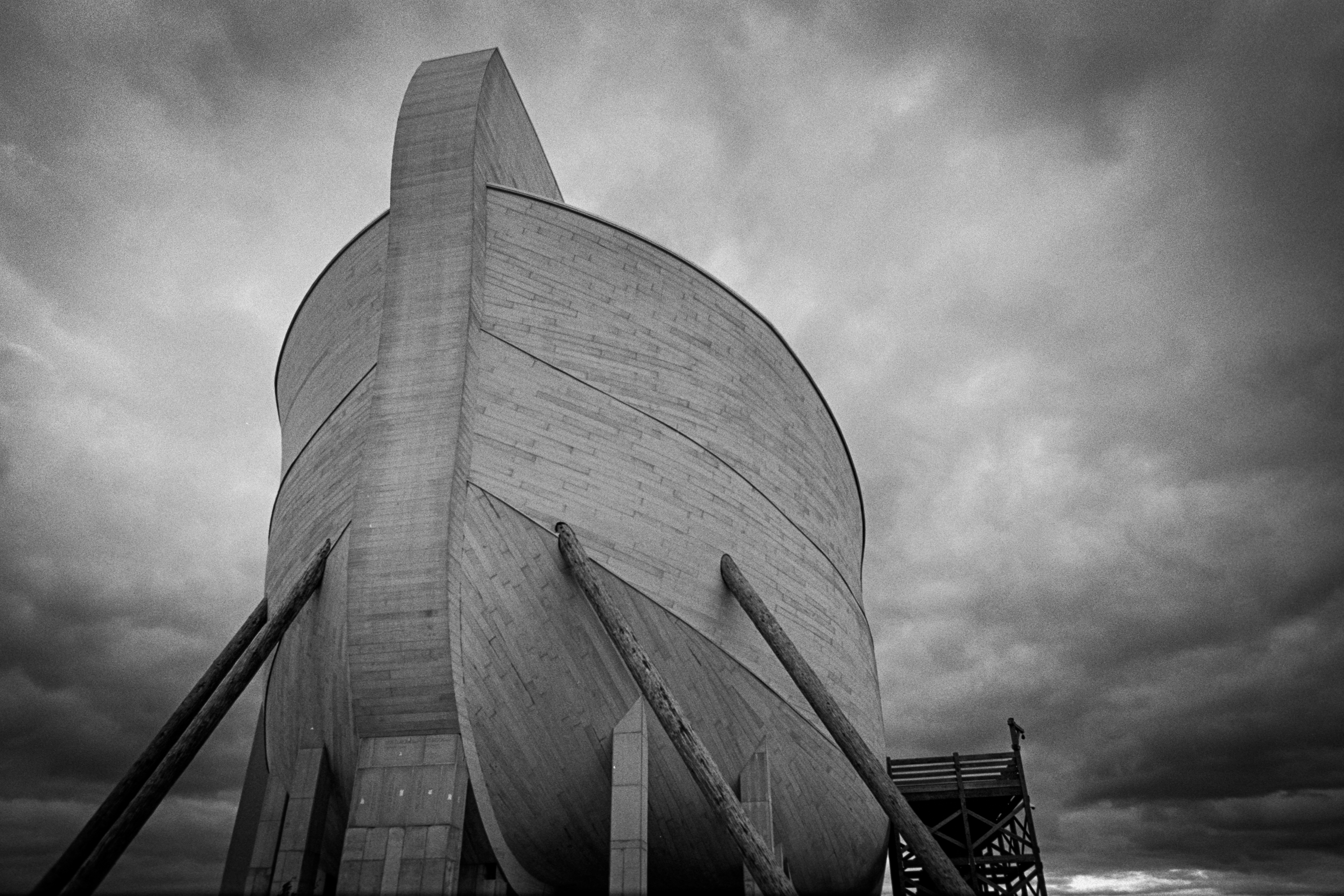
View of the Ark Encounter from the exterior ground level, October 2016

On October 22, 2016, the Ark Encounter hosted the premiere of evangelist Ray Comfort's film The Atheist Delusion.

Ozzy Osbourne and his son, Jack, visited the Ark Encounter in April 2017 to film an episode of their reality television series Ozzy & Jack's World Detour. The episode, entitled "Kentucky Fried Osbournes", aired on A&E on November 29, 2017.

Ark Encounter was designated the "Sight of the Week" for January 1–7, 2018, by Doug Kirby's RoadsideAmerica.com. The site gave Ark Encounter its highest rating ("The Best"), noting, "the Ark is an attraction that should be visited – if only because it's unlikely that you'll ever visit anything else like it." The review characterized the ark as "a very nuts-and-bolts American Ark, with Noah and his clan in the mold of self-sufficient Pilgrims and innovative pioneers" (emphasis in original).

On February 17, 2020, PBS aired a documentary about the Ark Encounter entitled We Believe in Dinosaurs. The filmmakers stated that their intention was to produce "a non-judgmental look at the Ark Encounter and its history", but upon release, Ken Ham called the film "an agenda-driven propaganda piece that does not rise to the level of a real documentary". Filmmakers Monica Long Ross and Clayton Brown followed the storyline of a "religious organization creating their own alternative science in a legitimate looking museum."

The Ark Encounter was chosen as the Best Religious Museum in the 2020 USA Today/10Best.com Readers Choice Awards. Its sister attraction, the Creation Museum, was ranked second. Polling for the award was halted during the COVID-19 pandemic, but resumed in 2023, when the Ark Encounter and Creation Museum were again voted first and second, respectively, in the Best Religious Museum category.

== Attendance ==
AiG initially predicted yearly attendance for the attraction of 1.4–2.2 million people. After a year of operation, AiG reported attendance of about 1 million, attributing the lower number to opening in the middle of tourist season.

On February 24, 2017, Executive Director of the Grant County Chamber of Commerce Jamie Baker stated that the Ark had drawn additional tourism to the area, and that the challenge now was to expand accommodation and other local amenities in order to convert this into economic growth for the county. In March, the Northern Kentucky Convention and Visitors Bureau presented the Ark Encounter with its Star of Tourism award for 2016.

Bureau President Eric Summe reported a $23 million increase in visitor spending in nearby Boone, Kenton, and Campbell counties in 2016 over 2015, the year that the region hosted the Major League Baseball All-Star Game; Summe attributed a large part of the increase in spending and hotel occupancy to the opening of the Ark Encounter and an expansion of its sister attraction, AiG's Creation Museum. In June 2017, Mayor Jim Wells of Dry Ridge, Kentucky stated that the Ark Encounter had a positive effect on the town, with hotel occupancy rates increasing from 60 to 98 percent since the opening of the attraction.

In July 2018, Nashville-based Athena Hospitality Group broke ground on a hotel and restaurant development in Dry Ridge, citing the need for more accommodations for Ark Encounter visitors as the motivation. The planned development will accommodate three hotels and three restaurants, with the first hotel, an 80-room Comfort Suites projected to open in the third quarter of 2019.

At the end of Ark Encounter's second year, July 2017 to June 2018, AiG reported an attendance of 1 million visitors for the year. County tax revenue (called "safety assessment") from paid ticket sales reflected approximately 860,000 paid admissions. The balance were young children and people with long-term passes, who did not require paid ticket entry. Because the city of Williamstown based their annual budget on AiG's attendance projections, the city was forced to readjust its budget downward when the number of paying guests fell short of projected.

In 2020, Williamstown Mayor Rick Skinner noted that Ark attendance had been averaging about ten percent higher than the city had forecast until its temporary closure due to COVID-19. At the end of the fiscal year, revenue from the safety assessment fell twenty percent short of projections.

In 2021, Ark Encounter returned to its 2019 attendance numbers and set record attendance numbers for certain days during the summer. Local businesses were booming as a result of increased tourism to Ark Encounter and Creation Museum. In April 2021, the Ark Encounter and Creation Museum were preparing to welcome their 10 millionth visitor altogether.

== Tax incentives controversies ==
Organizations dedicated to supporting the separation of church and state were divided on the question of providing tax incentives for the Ark Encounter. Barry W. Lynn of Americans United for Separation of Church and State opined that "The government should not be giving tax incentives for religious projects. Religion should be supported by voluntary donations, not the government." Bill Sharp, the staff attorney for the American Civil Liberties Union of Kentucky, replied that "Courts have found that giving such tax exemptions on a nondiscriminatory basis does not violate the establishment clause, even when the tax exemption goes to a religious purpose."

Edwin Kagin of American Atheists brought up the difficulty of litigating against the incentives provided by state laws, saying, "The legislation is so drafted that they will give this incentive to any organization that is going to increase tourism in Kentucky, and there's no question whatsoever that this group will." The editorial board of the Lexington Herald-Leader wrote that "Ark Encounters [sic] is a private company seeking to make a profit off of a biblical theme. As such, it seems as entitled to apply for incentives from promised profits as any other private, for-profit company in Kentucky." Still, the board was critical of using the incentives to attract low-paying jobs and to facilitate construction of an attraction it characterized as hostile "to science, knowledge and education", which could be off-putting to "the kind of employers that will provide good-paying jobs with a future".

Governor Steve Beshear favored the incentives, stating "The people of Kentucky didn't elect me governor to debate religion. They elected me governor to create jobs," Beshear said, adding, "There's nothing even remotely unconstitutional about a for-profit organization coming in and investing $150 million to create jobs in Kentucky and bring tourism to Kentucky." Responding to an open records request by the Lexington Herald-Leader, Beshear's office later admitted it had not seen the feasibility study cited in its press release, and an administration representative said that the state tourism department would have to conduct its own study in order for the park to be eligible for the incentives.

The state-commissioned study by Hunden Strategic Partners and paid for by Ark Encounter, LLC, projected that the park would draw nearly 1.4 million visitors a year, but could require the state to widen the Interstate 75 interchange at Williamstown, at an additional cost to the state of about $11 million. In an editorial in late December 2010, The Courier-Journal questioned the potential cost to the state government of the project, including highway upgrades and the likelihood that increases to hospitality industry infrastructure would seek further subsidies. In May 2011, the Kentucky Tourism Development Finance Authority voted unanimously to grant incentives of up to $43.1 million to Ark Encounter, LLC. for the project, by then projected to cost $172 million.

In June 2017, Grant County Judge Executive Stephen P. Wood told the Lexington Herald-Leader that the tax incentives offered to the Ark Encounter were "a really bad deal for taxpayers". Although the valuation of the property within Ark Encounter's tax increment financing district increased from $1.3 million in 2011 to $55 million in 2017, under the terms of its deal with Ark Encounter, the county only retained $63,000 of the $250,000 in property taxes collected within the district, with the rest returning to the park. School taxes were exempted from the deal, and Grant County Schools saw a 58% increase in property tax revenue from 2016 to 2017.

In April 2017, the city of Williamstown implemented a "safety assessment" of 50 cents per ticket sold at the Ark Encounter, the Williamstown Family Fun Park, and Main Street Gardens to upgrade the city's emergency equipment to sufficiently serve the attractions. AiG maintained that, as the largest of the three attractions, the assessment placed an undue share of the cost on Ark Encounter. After Williamstown officials rejected AiG's request to cap its share of the cost, first at $350,000 and later at $500,000, Ark Encounter LLC sold the main parcel of land for the attraction to its non-profit affiliate, Crosswater Canyon, for $10 and requested an exemption from the fee based on their status as a religious entity. County officials rejected that request.

On July 18, 2017, the state of Kentucky notified Ark Encounter that the sale of the property to Crosswater Canyon put them in breach of their agreement for $18 million in tax incentives. Three days later, Crosswater Canyon reversed the sale, transferring the land back to Ark Encounter, LLC for $10. On July 25, Ark Encounter said they would pay the safety assessment and had been collecting it on tickets sold beginning July 1.

In a public statement, AiG spokesman Mark Looy said, "The filing for an exemption as a religious non-profit (as permitted in the ordinance), was done in an attempt to get the county to change the wording as it currently stands, which would exempt the Ark Encounter. It was not to avoid paying its fair share, as some articles have suggested." AiG gave no official explanation for the transfer of land to or from Crosswater Canyon, which Williamstown officials had feared could be an attempt to avoid paying property taxes. The Grant County News and Express reported in December 2017 that the safety assessment had generated approximately $213,000 for the city in four months, with less than $500 of that amount being paid by attractions other than Ark Encounter.

In 2020, the Grant County News and Express reported that the Williamstown Family Fun Park had closed, and Main Street Gardens had become non-profit, exempting it from paying the safety assessment and leaving the Ark Encounter as the only business impacted. The assessment generated $432,776 in revenue for the city in the 2018–19 fiscal year, equaling 865,553 paid tickets for the fiscal year. The News and Express noted that this figure excluded children under 5 years old and lifetime members of the Ark Encounter, since neither group requires a paid ticket to enter.

The paper also noted that, in 2020, the Ark Encounter changed its pricing to allow free admission to children under 10 who visit the attraction with a paying adult; Williamstown Mayor Rick Skinner said that he believed this would attract more visitors to the park, offsetting any potential loss in city revenue from tickets that would have been sold to children between 6 and 10 years old.

In its first year of operation, Ark Encounter generated over $2.28 million in sales taxes for the state of Kentucky, a figure which excluded the period during which the attraction was owned by Crosswater Canyon. Ark Encounter received a rebate of $1.8 million of the collected taxes, the maximum amount allowed for the year under terms of its agreement with the state.

== Hiring policies controversy ==
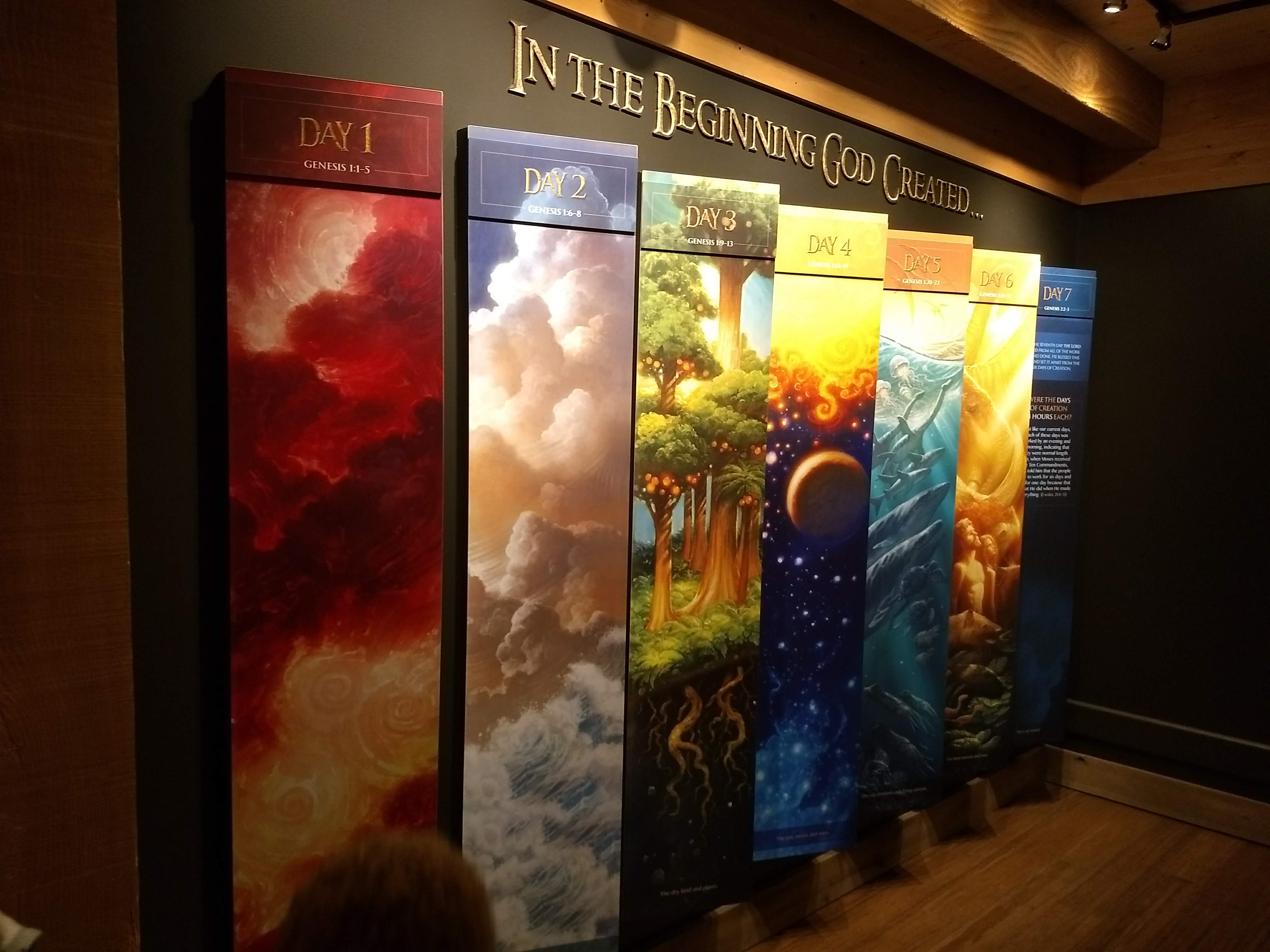
An Ark Encounter display describing the Genesis creation narrative

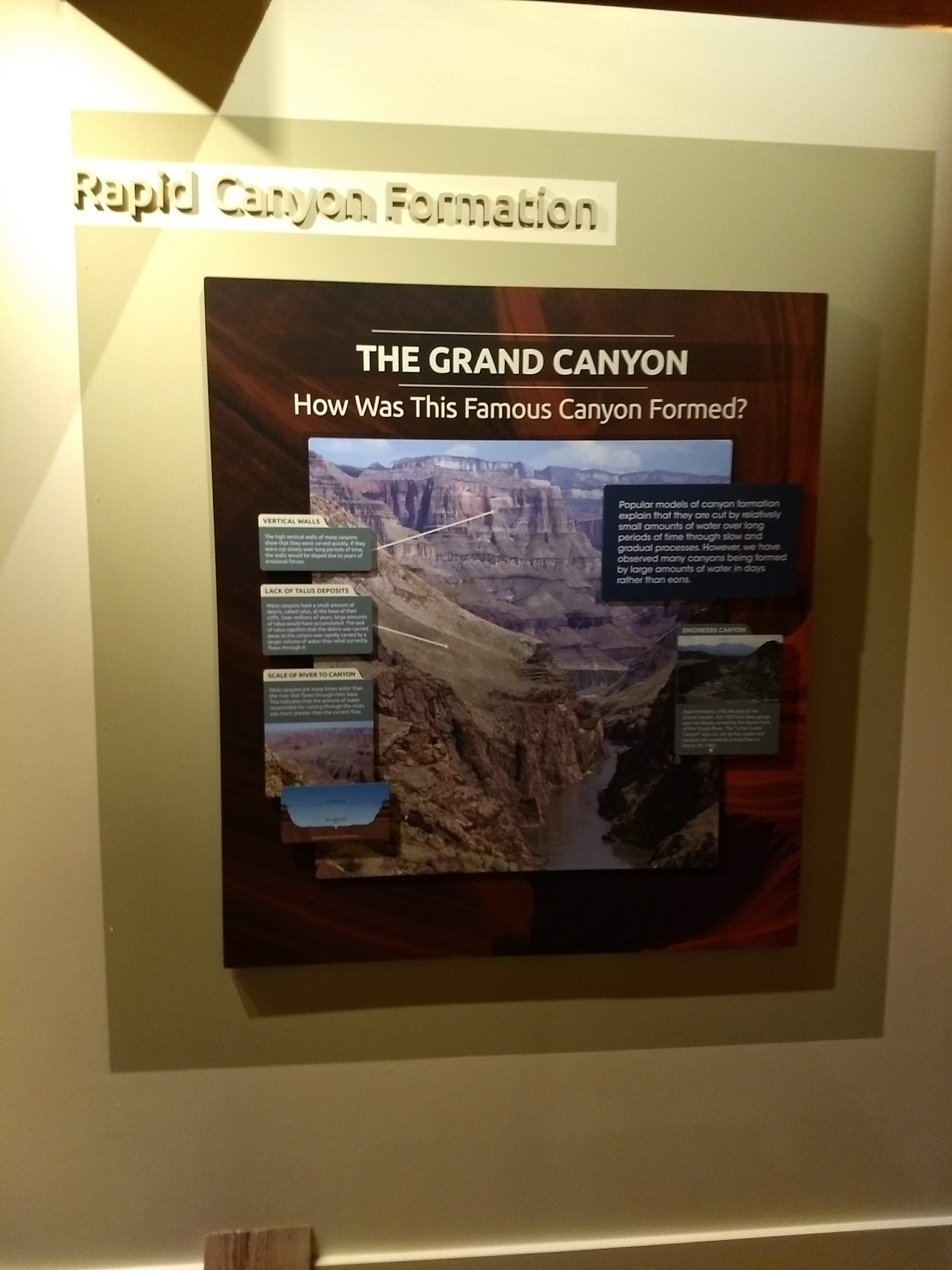
An Ark Encounter display promoting a relatively rapid formation of the Grand Canyon as a result of the Genesis flood

Ark Encounter employees must sign a statement that they agree with tenets of young Earth creationism such as the Genesis creation narrative and flood geology.

Americans United for the Separation of Church and State petitioned the Kentucky Tourism Development Finance Authority in August 2014 to withdraw its preliminary approval of tax incentives for the Ark Encounter because of AiG's hiring practices, which required all applicants to profess Christianity and sign a statement of faith attesting to their beliefs in young Earth creationism and that homosexuality is sinful among other requirements. Mike Zovath, AiG's coordinator for the Ark Encounter project, countered that the Ark Encounter's hiring policies had not been written yet and that the hiring policies of AiG should not be a factor because Ark Encounter, LLC was the entity receiving the incentives.

In response to Americans United's petition, a spokesman for the Kentucky Tourism, Arts and Heritage Cabinet said, "As a condition of any incentive program, all projects must follow all state and federal laws, including all laws related to hiring." Following Americans United's petition, the Lexington Herald-Leader editorial board also called for the incentives to be rescinded.

In October, Kentucky Tourism Arts and Heritage Cabinet Secretary Bob Stewart wrote to AiG requesting "express written assurance from Ark Encounter that it will not discriminate in any way on the basis of religion in hiring for the project". Citing the Supreme Court's decision in Burwell v. Hobby Lobby, which found that individuals had the right "to run their businesses as for-profit corporations in the manner required by their religious beliefs", AiG refused, insisting that Ark Encounter had the right to "include religion as a criteria [sic] in its future hiring decisions".

In December 2014, Stewart announced that the incentives would be withdrawn, because the facility was to be used for religious indoctrination instead of as a tourist attraction, and because of complaints of hiring discrimination. During the Christmas holidays, AiG conducted a billboard public relations campaign in support of the project in several metropolitan areas in Kentucky and a digital billboard in New York City's Times Square.

Ark Encounter LLC, filed a religious discrimination lawsuit against the state in February 2015. Freedom Guard chief counsel Mike Johnson represented AiG for free in the suit, which alleged the state of Kentucky violated Ark Encounter's First Amendment free speech rights by denying the incentives. AiG officials maintained that the incentives, potentially worth $18 million, were not necessary to complete construction of the ark, but they would accelerate the timeline for constructing additional phases of the Ark Encounter. After conservative Matt Bevin was elected to succeed Steve Beshear as governor in November 2015, Kentucky Senate Majority Leader Damon Thayer said he would encourage the new governor's administration to restore the tax incentives and render AiG's lawsuit moot, but Ham insisted that AiG preferred to have the matter adjudicated to set a legal precedent.

On January 25, 2016, Federal Judge Gregory F. Van Tatenhove of the United States District Court for the Eastern District of Kentucky ruled in favor of AiG in the case of Ark Encounter LLC et al. vs. Bob Stewart et al., ordering the state to commence processing the application for the tax rebate incentives that would become available once the Ark Encounter opened. Bevin announced that the state would not appeal Van Tatenhove's decision, and later replaced four of the nine members on the Tourism Development Finance Authority. Ark Encounter began advertising to fill 300 to 400 jobs in the park in April 2016; applicants were required to sign a statement of faith before being hired. Two weeks later, the Tourism Development Finance Authority approved the incentives.

== See also ==
- Flood myth
- List of flood myths
- Noah's Ark replicas and derivatives
- Religious cosmology
