= Lippard =

Lippard is a surname. Notable people with the surname include:

- George Lippard (1822–1854), American novelist
- Lucy R. Lippard (born 1937), American art critic
- Jim Lippard (born 1965), American skeptic
- Stephen J. Lippard (born 1940), American chemist
