= ARJ (disambiguation) =

ARJ is a compressed file format.

It may refer to:

- ARJ, the IATA code for Arso Airport, Indonesia
- Answers Research Journal, pseudoscientific publication
- The Comac ARJ21 Advanced Regional Jet
