= Answers Research Journal =

Pseudoscientific research journal

- Discipline: Creation Science
- Language: English
- Edited by: Andrew Snelling

Publication details
- History: 2008–present
- Publisher: Answers in Genesis (United States)
- Frequency: Annual
- Open access: Yes

Standard abbreviations
- ISO 4: Answ. Res. J.

Indexing
- ISSN: 1937-9056
- LCCN: 2007212884
- OCLC no.: 184738838

Links
- Journal homepage; Online Access

Answers Research Journal (ARJ) is an open-access creation science journal published by Answers in Genesis (AiG), a fundamentalist, Christian apologetics organization. Founded in 2008, the online journal devotes itself to research on "recent Creation and the global Flood within a biblical framework". ARJ's research is not scientifically sound and encourages readers to doubt mainstream scientific evidence. The journal, in its embrace of young Earth creationism (YEC), supports the unscientific idea of a 6,000-year-old Earth, among other claims. The journal refuses to publish research contradicting its belief system. While ARJ undergoes a peer-review process, the journal's reviewers are selected from a pool of people who only support the stances of the journal. Therefore, members of the scientific community are excluded from the review process.

Most of the journal's articles are written by a small group of authors, many without academic credentials, and authors are able to publish pseudonymously. ARJ's editorial board is not disclosed. The journal has been met with negative reception by various geologists, biologists, and scientific skeptics. Andrew Snelling, a YEC geologist, serves as the journal's editor-in-chief and as the director of research at AiG.

== History and overview ==
=== Background and beliefs ===
Answers in Genesis (AiG) is the largest young Earth creationist (YEC) organization in the world. Publications aimed at YEC scholars have existed since the mid-1960s, though these publications typically relied upon organizational membership and fee-based subscriptions. The launch of ARJ in 2008 marked the first free, open-access YEC peer-reviewed journal. ARJ was created because creationists argued biology journals would not publish their research because such journals were biased "against God in favor of Darwin". Most of the journal's articles are written by a small group of authors, many without academic credentials. In 2012, Callie Joubert (credentials unknown) contributed to almost half of the journal's articles that year. Editor-in-chief Snelling, Joubert, and Danny Faulkner (a "young universe astronomer") contributed to 45 percent of the articles in the 2014 volume. ARJ visually resembles real scientific open-access journals such as PLOS Genetics. AiG founder Ken Ham foresees both Christians and non-Christians to read the journal. YEC geologist Andrew Snelling serves as the journal's editor-in-chief and as the director of research at AiG. According to Snelling, the journal strives to "publish the best research possible from a creationist perspective in the sciences, humanities and theology." The journal's objective is not scientific inquiry. Rather, it aims to align their scholars' findings with a literal reading of the Bible.

AiG biologist Georgia Purdom contends the journal starts with the viewpoint that the Bible is true whereas other journals will "start with human reasoning as the basis for truth". The journal devotes itself to research on "recent Creation and the global Flood within a biblical framework". Such research is not scientifically sound. ARJ espouses a YEC and literalist interpretation of the Bible, which includes beliefs such as age of the Earth is approximately 6,000 years, the Genesis flood narrative, and the rejection of macroevolution. These notions contradict the findings of the scientific community. Using radioactive dating, scientists have learned the earth is around 4.5 billion years old. ARJ attempts to disprove radioactive dating or demonstrate the entirety of the rock record was the result of the biblical flood. ARJ frequently uses scientific language in an attempt to discredit scientific studies. Primarily, the journal exists to encourage readers to doubt mainstream scientific evidence.

=== Editorial policies ===
ARJ's editorial board is not disclosed and authors are not identified in the table of contents. Authors are also able to publish under a pseudonym. In order to be published in the journal, one's views must be aligned with the publisher's literalist interpretation of the Book of Genesis. Additionally, anyone working with AiG must sign a statement of faith, including a declaration reading: "No apparent, perceived or claimed evidence in any field, including history and chronology, can be valid if it contradicts the Scriptural record." As such, ARJ refuses to publish scientific works that contradict ideas within fundamentalist Christianity, and the editor-in-chief may reject a paper for any reason (including for violations of AiG’s "statement of faith"). While the journal undergoes a peer-review process, it is subject to extreme publication bias since the journal's reviewers are selected from a pool of individuals who "support the positions taken by the journal". As a result, members of the scientific community are excluded from the review process. The concept of "faith-checking" is also included in the review process. In the words of skeptic Steven Novella, the journal's peer-review process is "worthless" as it "serves only to give a false imprimatur of scientific legitimacy to a religious anti-scientific ideology."

=== Notable articles ===
The inaugural article of the journal, written by Liberty University professor Alan Gillen, was titled "Microbes and the days of creation". The paper dealt with the history of microorganisms and argued that they were created by God to act as "biological systems" with plants, animals, and humans. (The topic of microbiology is not mentioned anywhere within biblical scripture.) Additionally, Gillen argued the origins of HIV goes back to the biblical Fall (i.e., when Adam and Eve were banished from the Garden of Eden).

An article written by Rod J. Martin, described only as an "independent researcher", gave a creationist and denialist interpretation of climate change. According to Martin, climate change is essentially a hoax invented by "atheistic evolutionists". His thesis, incorrectly, states: "There is no reason either biblically or scientifically to fear the exaggerated and misguided claims of catastrophe as a result of increasing levels of man-made carbon dioxide (CO2)." A 2009 article proposes that God made oil shortly after creating the Earth and cites the biblical story of Noah's Ark as "evidence for his theory."

In an attempt to disprove evolution, a 2013 article argued that humans and chimpanzees only shared 70% of DNA. While there is no objective method to determine the percent DNA similarities of two species, scientists have come up with a range of 95–98% similarity between humans and chimps (with 96% being the consensus). The study compares whole chromosomes to see how they match up instead of comparing point mutations in specific parts of the chromosomes. The author of the study revised his estimate in 2015 to 88% after discovering a software bug in his genome sequence algorithm.

== Reception ==
Since inception, the journal has faced criticism from scientific skeptics. Biologist Paul Z. Myers refers to the journal as a "dishonest enterprise" and suggests "everything published in [ARJ] will be a crank paper". Novella regards the journal as an "insidious attack on science" and should be used as "a tool for exposing creationists for what they are." Describing the journal as "nonsense", philosopher Massimo Pigliucci contends the journal was created because "[creationists] seek respectability through fake museums and peer-reviewed journals because they know that the Middle Ages are over, and just shouting one's faith in a god is not going to cut it anymore."

Keith Miller, a geologist and Christian, says publications like ARJ are largely ignored by the scientific community but those lacking a scientific background may not be able to differentiate ARJ from genuine scientific journals. Anthropologist Eugenie Scott states ARJ is part of the "continued battle to excise science from local curricula". Mocking ARJ as a "science journal", geneticist Adam Rutherford writes, "sticking feathers up your butt does not make you a chicken", and posited the journal may be a prank. While applauding the journal's use of a double-blind peer review system, an article in Discover lamented that "there won't be any actual science to evaluate."

== See also ==
- Creation Research Society Quarterly
- Journal of Creation
