= We Believe in Dinosaurs =

2019 film on Ark museum

- Directed by: Monica Long Ross; Clayton Brown
- Written by: Monica Long Ross
- Produced by: Amy Ellison; Monica Long Ross; Clayton Brown
- Cinematography: Clayton Brown
- Edited by: Clayton Brown
- Music by: Kate Simko
- Production company: 137 Films
- Release dates: April 13, 2019 (San Francisco International Film Festival); November 19, 2019
- Running time: 99 minutes
- Country: United States
- Language: English

We Believe in Dinosaurs is a 2019 American documentary about the controversy surrounding the construction of the Ark Encounter museum in Williamstown, Kentucky. The museum features a scale model replica of Noah's Ark, its goal is to promote young Earth creationism and disprove evolution. Recorded over four years, the film catalogs the project from conception to completion and beyond.

According to its directors, Monica Long-Ross and Clayton Brown, the goal of the film is “to spark an important dialogue about the thorny intersection of belief, religion, and science — crossing into the cultural bubbles where so many Americans seem to exist." Their goal is not to convert creationists. They go on to say, “We hope that the film can shine a light on the important science and religion conflicts that we face today, including the increasing incidents of science denial, and what the erosion of the separation of church and state means for America, as well as across the world.”

The title of the film is a reference to the Ark Encounter's attempt to blend religious beliefs with science. The museum argues that non-avian dinosaurs existed alongside all modern animals including humans, but perished during the flood narrated in the Bible. The prevalence of dinosaur-based displays also attracts younger attendees, who are the prime target for religious instruction.

1091 Media has acquired North American distribution rights to the film.

== Synopsis ==
The Ark replica, dubbed Ark Encounter, is a project of the apologetics ministry Answers in Genesis. The movie follows the construction of the replica largely through the eyes of three individuals: Doug Henderson, the head designer, is a biblical literalist and develops lifelike animals to populate the Ark; David MacMillan is a former creationist (and a charter member of the parent Creation Museum) who now tries to convince creationists that modern science is compatible with religion; and geologist Dan Phelps, who fights against the "non-science" promulgated by the Ark Encounter. Phelps is joined by a local pastor, Chris Caldwell, in protesting tax incentives granted to the Ark Encounter.

Opening day attracted protests by Tri-State Freethinkers, led by Jim Helton, and a counter-protest organized by the creationist Eric Hovind. Williamstown residents hoped that the Ark Encounter would stimulate their economy, and over 1 million people visited the Ark Encounter in its first year, but it did little for the town. Indeed, near the end of the film, we see that Megan McCamey's general store, which had been featured earlier, is now closed.

== Reviews ==
We Believe in Dinosaurs earned a score of 91% from Rotten Tomatoes with an average score of 6.4/10.

Dennis Harvey, writing in Variety, thought that the film attempts "to portray both sides even-handedly [and] offers not so much a critique as a slightly bemused observation of the Ark Encounter." He adds that the film does not have "any overt message," but "suggest[s] that this eccentric collision between faith and secularism, commerce and politics—one that might have seemed wholly outlandish not long ago—is kinda-sorta the direction in which our republic is now headed."

Steven Farber in "The Hollywood Reporter" thought the film is an "intriguing and unfortunately timely documentary" but found it to be "sketchy." He thought that although it "is frustratingly incomplete at times, it convincingly and sometimes frighteningly explores the big-business connections to fundamentalist religion." He labels MacMillan and Phelps as among "a few naysayers" but argues that "the doc cries out for a few more scientific voices. The directors understandably didn’t want to overwhelm their audience with talking heads, but a few more sage voices would have been welcome."

Jenny Kermode writes in "Eye for Film" (UK) that "the film never comes across as mocking, letting all its participants speak for themselves and leaving the viewer to make sense of it all." She concludes, "This is a film about the value of stories and the way that, whether we believe them to be fact or fiction, they shape the way we understand the world."

Charles Barfield notes in The Playlist that "Brown and Ross have culled together a group of characters that are sincere, open, and above all, fascinating," but he is concerned that "by trying to cover such a massive story (both figuratively and literally) ‘Dinosaurs’ spreads itself so thin and loses its grip on the basics of storytelling."

Other reviewers include Gary Kramer, writing in Film International, who finds McMillan and Henderson to be "compelling because they show the difference between critical thinking versus blind faith" and thinks that "the film's greatest strength" is showing how "it adroitly reveals how people think and believe"; Will Warren, reviewing the 2019 AFI DOCS Film Festival in the "Washington City Paper"; Raquel Stecher in Quelle Movies; Brent Hankins in The Lamplight Review; Arlin Golden in a Film Inquiry roundup of the San Francisco International Film Festival; Alan Ng, writing in Film Threat; Steve Kopien, writing in Unseen Films; and Chris Knipp reviewing the film on his blog. Excerpts from various reviews may also be found in the article, "Reviews of the documentary 'We Believe in Dinosaurs'"

== Festivals and Interviews ==
We Believe in Dinosaurs was judged Best Documentary Feature at the 28th Annual Whitaker St. Louis International Film Festival, on 17 November 2019. It was shown at the American Film Institute's AFI DOCS Forum, in Washington and Silver Spring. The film was screened in New York at the DOC NYC festival, 13 and 14 November 2019 and at the SF Film Festival in San Francisco, 13 and 15 April 2019.

The film was additionally screened at the Hot Springs Documentary Film Festival in Hot Springs Arkansas, on 22 October 2019; the Virginia Film Festival, Charlottesville, Virginia, 27 October 2019; the Rocky Mountain Women's Film Festival at Colorado College, Colorado Springs, 17 November 2019; the Woods Hole Film Festival, Woods Hole, Massachusetts, 29 July 2019; and the Sidewalk Film Festival, Birmingham, Alabama, 24 August 2019.

In addition, Monica Long Ross, one of the producers, granted an interview to Sophie Willard of the website Women and Hollywood at the DOC NYC Festival on 12 November 2019.

Steven Saito, interviewing Brown and Long Ross at the San Francisco Film Fest ’19, opined that the directors had produced a "compelling documentary, never losing sight of their own beliefs while being respectful in presenting those of others."

The Friendly Atheist (Hemant Mehta) interviewed Long Ross and Amy Ellison in Episode 140, "The producers of the documentary We Believe in Dinosaurs" of his podcast in 2016, while the film was still in production. In 2017, the pseudonymous AronRa interviewed Brown, Long Ross, and Amy Ellison in "Episode 60 - We Believe in Dinosaurs" of his podcast Ra-Men.

Director Monica Long Ross and featured scientist Dan Phelps were interviewed by James Underdown on Point of Inquiry, a podcast from the Center for Inquiry, in June 2020, along with Rob Boston, Communications Director at Americans United for Separation of Church and State. They discussed the film in the larger context of science denial and the struggle between creationism and evolution. Boston said “It’s important to understand that this wasn’t just a fight over one museum, a big boat in Kentucky in a small town. This battle is played out across the country in public school classrooms every year.” Long Ross and Phelps discussed difficulties finding scientists willing to speak out against the museum due to fear of backlash from creationist groups, controversy over tax rebates given to the museum, and issues of employment discrimination by Answers in Genesis, the organization that runs the Ark Encounter.
