= Ken Ham =

Australian Christian fundamentalist (born 1951)

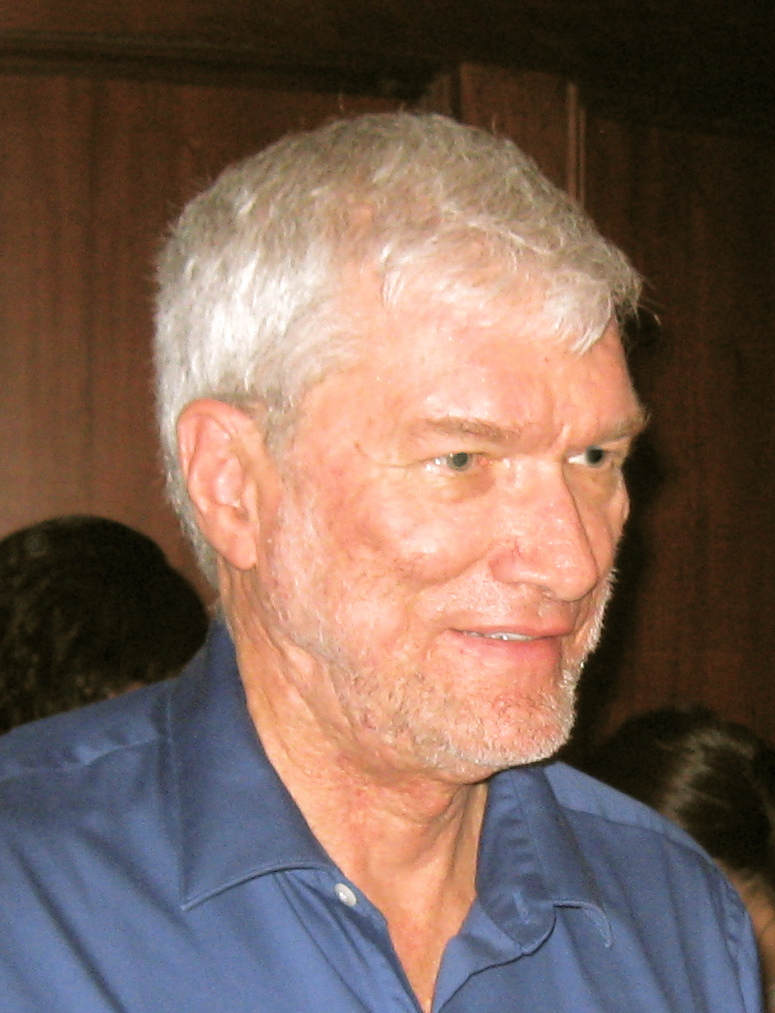
- Ham in 2012
- Born: 20 October 1951 (age 75); Cairns, Queensland, Australia
- Education: Queensland Institute of Technology (BAS); University of Queensland (DipEd)
- Occupation: Christian apologist
- Organisation: Answers in Genesis
- Title: Founder, CEO
- Spouse: Mally Ham
- Children: 5
- Website: answersingenesis.org

Kenneth Alfred Ham (born 20 October 1951) is an Australian Christian fundamentalist, young Earth creationist, apologist and former science teacher living in the United States. He is a founder, CEO, and former president of Answers in Genesis (AiG), a Christian apologetics organisation that operates the Creation Museum and the Ark Encounter.

Ham relies upon biblical literalism, claiming the creation narrative in the Book of Genesis is historical fact and that the universe and Earth were created together approximately 6,000 years ago, (Note: In How Do We Know the Bible Is True? Ham and Hodge wrote: "The biblical age of the earth is determined by adding up the genealogies from Adam ... to Christ. This is about 4000 years ... Christ lived about 2000 years ago, so this gives us about 6000 years as the biblical age of the earth." (p. 110). "I hold to that belief because I trust the Bible over the reasoning of man." (p. 109). "Some mainstream scientists have calculated the age of the earth at approximately 4.5 billion years ... Rejecting literal days of creation naturally leads to the acceptance of the supposed big bang as the evolutionary method God used to create the universe. Although we can simply add up the ages of the patriarch mentioned in the Genesis 5 and 11 genealogies to arrive at a date after creation for Abraham who lived about 4000 years ago, many reject this as a reasonable way of determining the timing of creation." (p. 110). "Surely God is free to accomplish miracles within the world He created, so this should not be a problem for those who believe what God has revealed through the Scriptures. But neither should creating the universe in six days or causing the entire globe to be flooded ..." (p. 113).) contrary to scientific consensus that indicates that the Earth is about 4.5 billion years old and the universe about 13.8 billion years old.

== Early life ==
Ham was born 20 October 1951 in Cairns, Queensland. His father, Mervyn, was a Christian educator and a school principal in several schools throughout Queensland.

Ham earned a bachelor's degree in applied science (focused on environmental biology) from the Queensland Institute of Technology. He holds a Diploma in Education from the University of Queensland. At university, he was influenced by John C. Whitcomb and Henry M. Morris's 1961 book The Genesis Flood: The Biblical Record and Its Scientific Implications. After his 1975 graduation, Ham began teaching science at Dalby State High School in Dalby, Queensland.

== Career ==
In 1977, Ham began teaching at a Brisbane high school. He met John Mackay, who also believed in young Earth creationism. According to Susan and William Trollinger, Ham was appalled because "some...students assumed their textbooks that taught evolutionary science successfully proved the Bible to be untrue". He said this "put a 'fire in my bones' to counteract influences of evolutionary thinking on students and the public". In 1979, he resigned from teaching and, with his wife, founded Creation Science Supplies and Creation Science Educational Media Services, to provide resources for teaching creationism in Queensland public schools, a practice subsequently dis-allowed. In 1980, the Hams and Mackay merged with Carl Wieland's Creation Science Association to form the Creation Science Foundation (CSF).

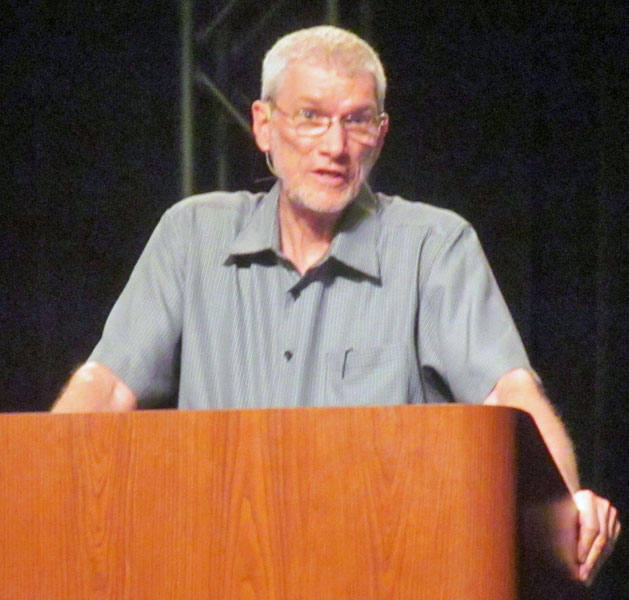
Ham speaking at the Creation Museum in 2014

As CSF's work expanded, Ham moved to the United States in 1987 to engage in speaking tours with another young Earth creationist organisation, the Institute for Creation Research (ICR). His "Back to Genesis" lecture series focused on three major themes – that evolutionary theory led to cultural decay, that literal reading of the first eleven chapters of the Book of Genesis contained the true origin of the universe and a pattern for society, and that Christians should engage in a culture war against atheism and humanism. As his popularity grew in United States, Ham left ICR in 1994 and, with colleagues Mark Looy and Mike Zovath, founded Creation Science Ministries with assistance from what is now Creation Ministries International (Australia). In 1997, Ham's organisation changed its name to Answers in Genesis.

From the time of AiG's foundation, Ham planned to open a museum and training centre near its Florence, Kentucky headquarters, telling an Australian Broadcasting Corporation interviewer in 2007, "Australia's not really the place to build such a facility if you're going to reach the world. Really, America is." In a separate interview with The Sydney Morning Herald's Paul Sheehan, Ham explained, "One of the main reasons [AiG] moved [to Florence] was because we are within one hour's flight of 69 percent of America's population." The museum, located in Petersburg, Kentucky, opened 27 May 2007.

In February 2018, Ham was disinvited from University of Central Oklahoma, where he was scheduled to speak, after an LGBTQ student group objected. Later that month, UCO reinvited Ham to speak. He spoke on March 5 as planned.

== Disputes with CMI and GHC ==
In 2005, the AiG Confederation crumbled due to disagreements between Ham and Wieland over "differences in philosophy and operation". Ham retained leadership of branches in UK and US while Wieland became managing director of the Australian branch and Canadian, New Zealand and South African branches. The Australian branch was renamed Creation Ministries International (CMI). The AiG stayed with Ham and continued to expand staff and work closely with the Institute for Creation Research (ICR). Young Earth creationist Kurt Wise was recruited by Ham as a consultant to help with concluding the museum project.

In May 2007, Creation Ministries International (CMI) filed a lawsuit against Ham and AiG in the Supreme Court of Queensland seeking damages and accusing him of deceptive conduct in dealings with the Australian organisation. Members of the group expressed "concern over Mr. Ham's domination of the groups, the amount of money being spent on his fellow executives and a shift away from delivering the creationist message to raising donations." Ham was accused of trying to send the Australian ministry into bankruptcy. According to the CMI website, this dispute was amicably settled in April 2009. In 2008, Ham appeared in Bill Maher's comedy-documentary Religulous. AiG criticised the movie for what it called Maher's "dishonesty last year in gaining access to the Creation Museum and AiG President Ken Ham."

In March 2011, the board of Great Homeschool Conventions, Inc. (GHC) voted to disinvite Ham and AiG from future conventions. Conference organiser Brennan Dean stated that Ham had made "unnecessary, ungodly, and mean-spirited statements that are divisive at best and defamatory at worst". Dean stated further, "We believe Christian scholars should be heard without the fear of ostracism or ad hominem attacks." The disinvitation occurred after Ham criticised Peter Enns of the BioLogos Foundation, who advocated a symbolic rather than literal interpretation of the fall of Adam and Eve. Ham accused Enns of espousing "outright liberal theology that totally undermines the authority of the Word of God".

== Bill Nye–Ken Ham debate ==
In February 2014, Ham debated with American science educator Bill Nye (best known for his eponymous show, Bill Nye the Science Guy) on the topic of whether young Earth creationism is a viable model of origins in the contemporary scientific era. Critics expressed concern that the debate lent the appearance of scientific legitimacy to creationism while also stimulating Ham's fundraising. Nye said the debate was "an opportunity to expose the well-intending Ken Ham and the support he receives from his followers as being bad for Kentucky, bad for science education, bad for the U.S., and thereby bad for humankind."

Ham said that publicity generated by the debate helped stimulate construction of the Ark Encounter theme park, which had been stalled for lack of funds. The Ark Encounter opened on 7 July 2016, a date (7/7) chosen to correspond with Genesis 7:7, the Bible verse that describes Noah entering the ark. The following day, Nye visited Ark Encounter, and he and Ham had an informal debate.

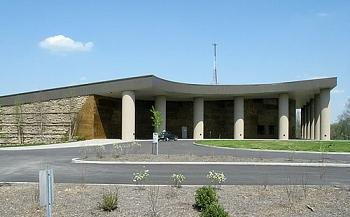
Creation Museum in Petersburg, Kentucky

== Beliefs ==
=== Creationism ===
According to Ham, he was inspired by his father, also a young Earth creationist, to interpret the Book of Genesis as "literal history" and first rejected what he termed "molecules-to-man evolution" during high school.

As a young Earth creationist and biblical inerrantist, Ham believes that the Book of Genesis is historical fact. Ham believes the age of the Universe to be about 6,000 years, and asserts that Noah's flood occurred about 4,400 years ago in approximately 2348 BC. Astrophysical measurements and radiometric dating show that the age of the universe is about 13.8 billion years and the age of the Earth is about 4.5 billion years. Arguing that knowledge of evolution and the Big Bang require observation rather than inference, Ham urges asking scientists and science educators, "Were you there?" The Talk.origins archive responds that the evidence for evolution "was there", and that knowledge serves to determine what occurred in the past and when. "Were you there?" questions also invalidate creationism as science. Ham argues that if the Bible is the word of God, creationism is not invalidated by this question, since God was there.

=== Other beliefs ===
Ham claims abortion, same-sex marriage, homosexuality, and being transgender "are all attacks on the true family God ordained in Scripture". As a condition for employment at the Ark Encounter, AiG, directed by Ham, requires workers to sign a statement asserting that they view homosexuality as a sin.

Ham rejects the scientific consensus on climate change.

== Reception ==
Chris Mooney, of Slate magazine, believes Ham's advocacy of young Earth creation will "undermine science education and U.S. science literacy".

Andrew O'Hehir of Salon argues that the "liberal intelligentsia" have grossly overstated the influence of Ken Ham and those espousing similar views because, while "religious ecstasy, however nonsensical, is powerful in a way reason and logic are not", advocates like Ham "represent a marginalised constituency with little power".

Ham has been awarded honorary degrees by six Christian colleges: Temple Baptist College (1997), Liberty University (2004), Tennessee Temple University (2010), Mid-Continent University (2012), Bryan College (2017) and Mid-America Baptist Theological Seminary (2018).

On 17 February 2020, PBS aired a documentary about the Ark Encounter entitled We Believe in Dinosaurs. Filmmakers Monica Long Ross and Clayton Brown followed the story line of a "religious organisation creating their own alternative science in a legitimate looking museum".

== Personal life ==
Ham is married to Mally Ham and the couple have five children.

== Works ==
- Ham, Ken (1987). The Lie: Evolution. Green Forest, Arkansas: Master Books. ISBN 0-89051-158-6.
- Ham, Ken (1999). Creation Evangelism for the New Millennium. Green Forest, Arkansas: Master Books. ISBN 0-89051-247-7.
- Ham, Ken; Batten, Don & Wieland, Carl (2000). One Blood: The Biblical Answer to Racism. Green Forest, Arkansas: Master Books. ISBN 0-89051-276-0.
- Ham, Ken (2002). Why Won't They Listen?. Green Forest, Arkansas: Master Books. ISBN 0-89051-378-3.
- Ham, Ken (2007). How Could a Loving God...?. Green Forest, Arkansas: Master Books. ISBN 978-0-89051-504-4.
- Ham, Ken & Ware, Charles (2007). Darwin's Plantation: Evolution's Racist Roots. Green Forest, Arkansas: Master Books. ISBN 978-0-89051-497-9.
- Ham, Ken (2008). Raising Godly Children in an Ungodly World. Green Forest, Arkansas: Master Books. ISBN 978-0-89051-542-6.
- Ham, Ken; Beemer, Britt & Hillard, Todd (2009). Already Gone: Why Your Kids Will Quit Church and What You Can Do To Stop It. Green Forest, Arkansas: Master Books. ISBN 978-0-89051-529-7.
- Ham, Ken & Ware, Charles (2010). One Race One Blood. Green Forest, Arkansas: Master Books. ISBN 978-0-89051-601-0.
- Ham, Ken; Hall, Greg & Hillard, Todd (2011). Already Compromised. Green Forest, Arkansas: Master Books. ISBN 978-0-89051-607-2.
- Ham, Ken (2013). Six Days: The Age of the Earth and the Decline of the Church. Green Forest, Arkansas: Master Books. ISBN 978-0-89051-789-5.
- Ham, Ken & Kinley, Jeff (2015). Ready to Return: Bringing Back the Church's Lost Generation. Green Forest, Arkansas: Master Books. ISBN 978-0-89051-836-6.
- Ham, Ken; Hodge, Bodie (2016). A Flood of Evidence: 40 Reasons Noah and the Ark Still Matter. Green Forest, Arkansas: Master Books. ISBN 978-0-89051-978-3.
- Ham, Ken; Ross, Hugh; Haarsma, Deborah & Mdyer, Stephen (2017). Four Views on Creation, Evolution and Intelligent Design. Zondervan Academic. ISBN 978-0-310-08097-8.
- Ham, Ken (2018). Gospel Reset: Salvation Made Relevant. Green Forest, Arkansas: Master Books. ISBN 978-1-68344-114-4.
- Ham, Ken; Hodge, Bodie (2019). Glass House: Shattering the Myth of Evolution. Green Forest, Arkansas: Master Books. ISBN 978-1-68344-156-4.
- Ham, Ken (2020). Will They Stand: Parenting Kids to Face the Giants. Green Forest, Arkansas: Master Books. ISBN 978-1-68344-256-1.
- Ham, Ken (2021). Divided Nation: Cultures in Chaos & A Conflicted Church. Green Forest, Arkansas: Master Books. ISBN 978-1-68344-283-7.
- Ham, Ken (2021). Creation to Babel. Green Forest, Arkansas: Master Books. ISBN 978-1-68344-290-5.
- Ham, Ken (2023). Divine Dilemma: Wrestling With the Question of a Loving God in a Fallen World. Green Forest, Arkansas: Master Books. ISBN 978-1-68344-355-1.
- Ham, Ken (2024). The Lie: Unraveling the Myth of Evolution/Millions of Years. Green Forest, Arkansas: Master Books. ISBN 978-1-68344-391-9.
- Ham, Ken (2025). Miraculous: The Ken Ham and Answers in Genesis Story. Green Forest, Arkansas: Master Books. ISBN 978-1-68344-3810.
