= Carl Wieland =

Australian creationist

- Born: 1950 (age 75–76); Australia
- Education: University of Adelaide, MD
- Occupation: Evangelist
- Known for: Advocate of Young Earth Creationism
- Spouse: Margaret Buchanan

Carl Wieland (born 1950) is an Australian young Earth creationist, author and speaker. He was the managing director of Creation Ministries International (formerly Answers in Genesis - Australia), a Creationist apologetics ministry. CMI are the distributors of Creation magazine and the Journal of Creation.

== Biography ==
Wieland was a medical doctor. He graduated from University of Adelaide, South Australia. In 1986, he stopped practising medicine due to an accident with "a fully laden fuel tanker at highway speeds." He spent over five months in hospital, undergoing more than fifty operations (discussed in: Walking Through Shadows). He is past president of South Australia's Christian Medical Fellowship.

Wieland claimed he was an atheist at university. However, in 1976 Wieland formed the Creation Science Association (CSA), a South Australian creationist organisation modelled after the Creation Research Society. They published Ex Nihilo magazine (later called Creation Ex Nihilo) from 1978, "to explain and promote special creation as a valid scientific explanation of origins." CSA merged in 1980 with a Queensland group to form the Creation Science Foundation, that later became Answers in Genesis (AiG). AiG split in 2005 after disagreements between Carl Wieland, CEO Australia, and Ken Ham, CEO USA. Ham retained leadership of US and UK branches. Wieland retained an Australian branch, named Creation Ministries International, affiliated with Canadian, New Zealand and South African branches, with offices in USA and UK.

On 6 March 2015, Wieland retired from active creation ministry, and stepped down as CEO of CMI-Australia.

== Reactions to Wieland ==
Alec MacAndrew, in 2006, states that, while he perceived Wieland to be "one of the more careful proponents of creationism", Wieland had nevertheless failed to update his reference to scientific data, to show that Mitochondrial Eve had been dated to 175,000 years ago, rather than 6,500 years ago. MacAndrew argued that therefore, the misinterpretation of data could not support a literal biblical Eve.

== Publications ==
- Wieland, Carl (October 1996). Stones and Bones: Powerful Evidence Against Evolution. Master Books. ISBN 0-89051-175-6.
- Wieland, Carl. (2002). 101 Signs of Design: Timeless Truths From Science. Green Forest, AR: Master Books. ISBN 0-89051-368-6.
- Wieland, Carl.; Ham, Ken. (2002). Walking Through Shadows: Finding Hope in a World of Pain. Green Forest, AR: Master Books. ISBN 0-89051-381-3.
- Wieland, Carl. (2004). The Genesis File. Green Forest, Ark.: Master Books. ISBN 0-89051-409-7.

== Sources ==
- "Carl Wieland Biography". Creation Ministries International. 2007.
- "Events Calendar". Creation Ministries International.
- Numbers, Ronald (30 November 2006). The Creationists: From Scientific Creationism to Intelligent Design, Expanded Edition. Harvard University Press. pp. 624 pages. ISBN 0-674-02339-0.
- "Regenerating ribs: Adam and that 'missing' rib". Creation Ministries International. 2007.
