= Answers in Genesis =

Nonprofit organization promoting young Earth creationism

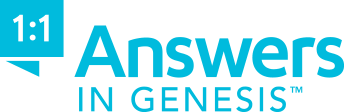
- Abbreviation: AiG
- Formation: 1994; 32 years ago
- Type: Nonprofit young Earth creationism organization
- Legal status: Nonprofit
- Headquarters: Petersburg, Kentucky, U.S.
- President: Ken Ham
- Revenue: US$34,739,452 (2018)
- Expenses: US$26,776,172 (2018)
- Website: answersingenesis.org

Answers in Genesis (AiG) is an American nonprofit organization that advocates the pseudoscience of young Earth creationism. On the basis of its literal, historical-grammatical interpretation of the Book of Genesis and the Bible as a whole, it rejects the results of scientific investigations that contradict its view of the Genesis creation narrative and instead supports pseudoscientific creation science. The organization sees evolution as incompatible with the Bible and believes anything other than the young Earth view is a compromise on the principle of biblical inerrancy.

AiG began as the Creation Science Foundation in 1980, following the merger of two Australian creationist groups. Its name changed to Answers in Genesis in 1994, when Ken Ham founded its United States branch. In 2006, the branches in Australia, Canada, New Zealand, and South Africa split from the US and UK to form Creation Ministries International. In 2007, AiG opened the Creation Museum, a facility that promotes young-Earth creationism, and in 2016, the organization opened the Ark Encounter, a Noah's Ark-themed amusement park. AiG also publishes websites, magazines, journals, and a streaming service, and its employees have published books.

== Organization ==
Answers in Genesis resulted from the merging of two Australian creationist organizations in 1980, one led by John Mackay and Ken Ham (Creation Science Supplies and Creation Science Educational Media Services) and the other by Carl Wieland (Creation Science Association). The organization later became known as Answers in Genesis. It is based in Petersburg, Kentucky, and has international offices in Australia, Canada, Peru, and the United Kingdom. Following turmoil in 2005, the AiG network split in 2006. The US and UK branches retained the AiG name and control of the AiG website under Ham's leadership. The Australian, Canadian, New Zealand, and South African branches rebranded themselves as Creation Ministries International (CMI). In 2007, CMI filed suit against AiG-USA alleging a variety of wrongdoings, including publicly defaming their organization. In April 2009, the ministries reached a settlement and ended their dispute.

In June 2006, Answers in Genesis launched the Answers magazine in the United States and United Kingdom, followed by the Answers Research Journal in 2008, which was widely criticized in the media and scientific circles. Also in 2006, the National Religious Broadcasters awarded Answers in Genesis their Best Ministry Website award. In May 2007, AiG launched the Creation Museum in the United States. The museum received criticism from the National Center for Science Education and petitions of protest from the scientific community.

== Views and activities ==
From the outset, Ken Ham did not share the interest of other groups promoting creation science in aiming to produce evidence supporting young Earth creationism, although Answers in Genesis still maintains that "creation science is real science". Instead, Answers in Genesis focuses on presenting evangelicalism as an all-out battle of their biblical worldview against a perceived naturalistic scientific worldview. Ham's message has had three central points:

- that teaching of evolution is an evil causing damage to society;
- that the first eleven chapters of the Book of Genesis give a precise description of the process of creation of the universe and provide direct instruction on the organization of society;
- that proper Christians must engage in a total conflict battling against atheistic humanism.

Answers in Genesis messages promote central young-Earth creationist doctrines, including the concepts of literal Creation of the Earth in six 24-hour days and effects of a global flood. Still, they focus mainly on accepting the authority of their particular literal reading of the Bible. They present this as choosing one's ultimate authority for truth, with God's Word and human reason as the two possible options. They hence introduce the concept of "biblical reasoning", where one is "never to attempt to reason in opposition to the Word of God", and thus claim that this biblical reasoning and biblical faith "work very well together".

The Answers in Genesis organization rejects key scientific facts and theories established by archeology, cosmology, geology, paleontology, and evolutionary biology, and argues that the universe, the Earth, and life originated about 6,000 years ago. (Creationist beliefs reject natural causes and events in scientific explanations of nature and of the origin of the universe in favor of the supernatural, and the Supreme Court of the United States has ruled that creationism is religion.)

A book published by one of AiG's employees in 2006 accused Hollywood of using subtle tactics to slip "evolutionary content" into SpongeBob SquarePants, Lilo & Stitch and Finding Nemo, affirming that "As Christians we need to reflect the Bible's standards and not Hollywood's perverted version of reality."

In 2020, AiG launched its own streaming service, Answers.tv, intended as an alternative to Netflix, Disney+, and other streaming platforms.

AiG has objected to the James Webb Space Telescope, saying "Sadly, many in this particular camp (sometimes ignorantly) have actually compromised Scripture by accepting the secular ideas being pushed by the JWST media at NASA (i.e., the big bang and evolution), thus rejecting the plain (biblical) reading of Genesis 1 and instead reinterpreting the days of creation to long ages. This is an unbiblical way of thinking that essentially elevates man's fallible ideas as the ultimate standard (i.e., humanism) over the infallible Word of God".

On June 18, 2025, AiG opened a virtual-reality attraction called the "Truth Traveler" in Pigeon Forge, Tennessee.

=== Creation Museum ===
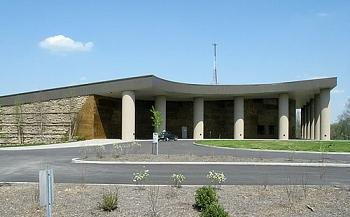
The Creation Museum

AiG's Creation Museum is a museum displaying a Young-Earth creationist worldview and pseudoarchaeology. The facility has received much criticism from the scientific and religious communities, as well as from cultural commentators. The Creation Museum opened May 27, 2007, at a cost of $27 million raised entirely by private donations. The displays were created by Patrick Marsh, known for work on Universal Studios Florida attractions for King Kong and Jaws.

A. A. Gill, a British writer and critic, described the museum as "battling science and reason since 2007", writing: "This place doesn't just take on evolution—it squares off with geology, anthropology, paleontology, history, chemistry, astronomy, zoology, biology, and good taste. It directly and boldly contradicts most -onomies and all -ologies, including most theology."

In 2012 a report noted that "public fascination" with the Creation Museum was "fading". In November 2012 AiG reported that attendance for the year ended June 30 came to 254,074, which represented a 10 percent drop from the previous year and the attraction's "fourth straight year of declining attendance and its lowest annual attendance yet". By mid-2015, 2.4 million people had visited the museum (about 340,000 visitors over seven years), and in 2017, AiG reported that in the year since its other attraction, the Ark Encounter, opened, the Creation Museum saw over 800,000 visitors, nearly triple the annual average of 300,000 visitors.

=== Ark Encounter ===
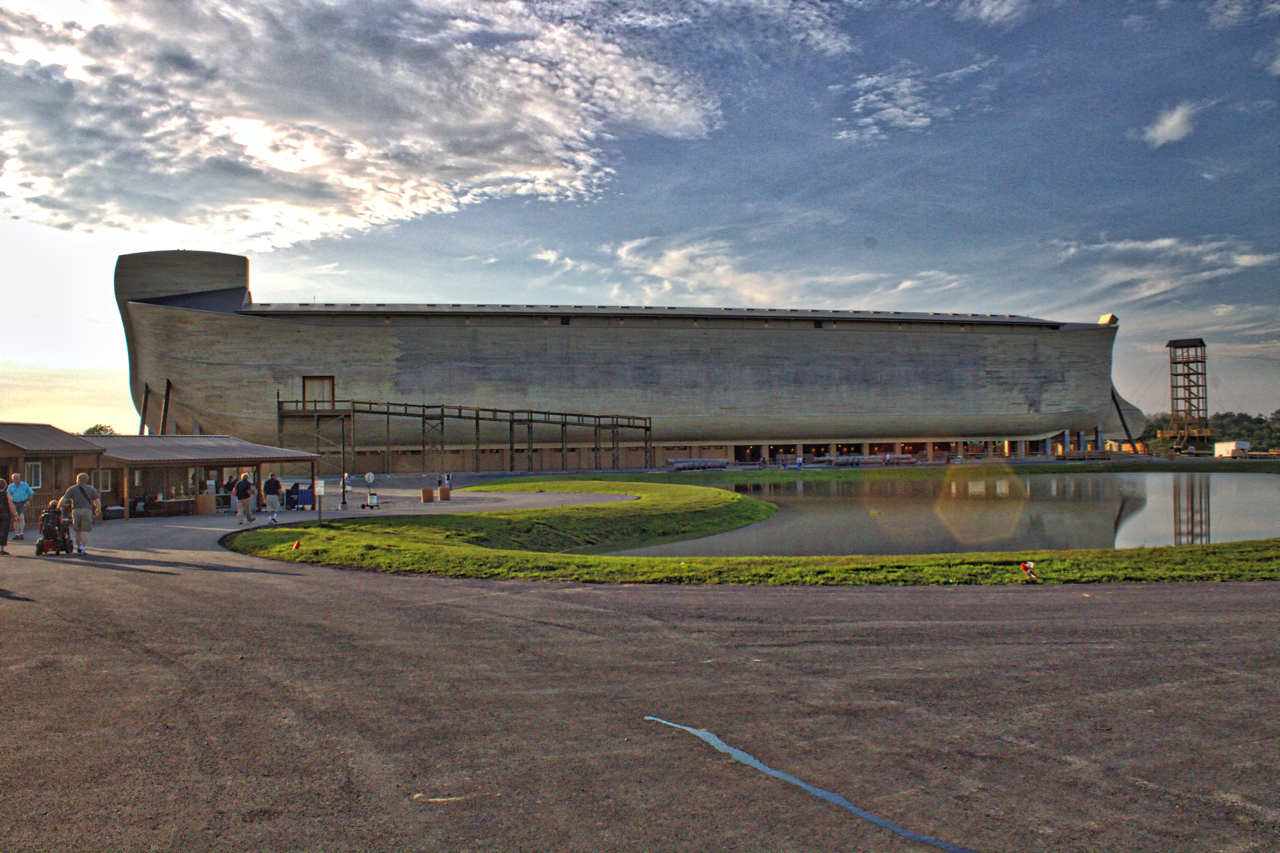
Noah's Ark at Ark Encounter

Answers in Genesis opened Ark Encounter, a theme-park, in Grant County, Kentucky on July 7, 2016. The centerpiece of the park is a full-scale model of Noah's Ark at 510 feet (160 m) long and 81 feet (25 m) high. After a visit to Ark Encounter, Bill Nye, who had previously debated Ham, described his experience as "much more troubling or disturbing than [he] thought it would be" and stated that "on the Ark's third deck, every single science exhibit is absolutely wrong". In December 2016, for the holiday season, AiG lit the Ark with rainbow colors, aiming to "reclaim the symbol from the gay rights movement" and to remind viewers of the Noahic covenant.

By late October 2016, over 400,000 people had visited the attraction. This contrasts with a state study that projected the attraction would receive 325,000 to under 500,000 visitors in the first year. AiG reported that the Ark Encounter in its first year of operation attracted over 1 million visitors and aggregated 1.5 million total visitors for both the Ark and the Creation Museum.

== Workforce ==
In 2007 about 160 people including a chaplain worked at the Creation Museum (a division of AiG, so these were AiG employees) and another 140 people worked at the attached AiG headquarters. Each permanent employee of AiG including people who work at the museum must sign a statement of faith "in order to preserve the function and integrity of the ministry", indicating that they believe in young Earth creationism and the other teachings of Answers in Genesis. These include "Scripture teaches a recent origin for man and the whole creation", "the only legitimate marriage is the joining of one man and one woman", "the great Flood of Genesis was an actual historic event" and "no apparent, perceived or claimed evidence in any field, including history and chronology, can be valid if it contradicts the Scriptural record". When applying for work a written statement of one's beliefs is required along with résumé and references. In 2007, The Kentucky Post reported that the Creation Museum employed between 10 and 20 security guards armed with .40 caliber Glock handguns and three certified law enforcement canines.

Creationist geologist Andrew A. Snelling started working with AiG in 2007 as its director of research.

== Reception ==
Creation science, which is supported by AiG, is a pseudoscience that "lacks the central defining characteristic of all modern scientific theories". Scientific and scholarly organizations, including the National Academy of Sciences, Paleontological Society, Geological Society of America, Australian Academy of Science, and the Royal Society of Canada have issued statements against the teaching of creationism. The National Center for Science Education, a science advocacy group, criticize AiG's promotion of non-science.

Skeptical or atheistic organizations have also singled out Answers in Genesis for criticism. Members of the Australian Skeptics and retired civil servant John Stear maintain a website No Answers in Genesis in direct response to AiG for the purpose of rebutting their claims. In 2011, skeptic Brian Dunning listed it as #5 on his "Top 10 Worst Anti-Science Websites" list.

Answers in Genesis has also been criticized by other Christians. Astronomer Hugh Ross's organization Reasons To Believe, a progressive creationist organization, is a critic of Answers in Genesis. The BioLogos Foundation, which promotes evolutionary creationism, has stated that the views of Answers in Genesis have "force[d] many thoughtful Christians to lose their faith", while The Biologos Foundation "protect[s the Christian] faith".

=== Richard Dawkins interview ===
In 1998, Answers in Genesis filmed an interview with Richard Dawkins, a prominent evolutionary biologist at Oxford University, resulting in a controversial video that AiG posted on its website. Dawkins addressed it in the essay: "The 'Information Challenge'", published in A Devil's Chaplain in 2003. The "suspiciously amateurish" interview included, according to Dawkins, "the kind of question only a creationist would ask in that way" (namely, to "give an example of a genetic mutation or an evolutionary process which can be seen to increase the information in the genome"). Realizing that he had been duped, Dawkins, at his admission, was angry at the thought and initially refused to answer the question but relented and continued the interview. Dawkins wrote: "My generosity was rewarded in a fashion that anyone familiar with fundamentalist tactics might have predicted. When I eventually saw the film a year later, I found that it had been edited to give the false impression that I was incapable of answering the question about information content. In fairness, this may not have been quite as intentionally deceitful as it sounds. You have to understand that these people really believe that their question cannot be answered!"

The Australian Skeptics wrote that AIG edited the film to give the appearance that Dawkins was unable to "give an example of a genetic mutation or an evolutionary process which can be seen to increase the information in the genome" and that a segment that shows him pausing for 11 seconds was a film of him considering whether to expel the interviewer from the room for not revealing her creationist sympathies at the outset. Dawkins reported to the Australian Skeptics that the interviewer shown in the finished film was not the same person who had originally asked the questions. Dawkins and Barry Williams also said that AIG had subsequently changed the question to make it look like Dawkins, who answered the original question put to him, was unable to answer.

=== Billboards ===
In the spring of 2009, Answers in Genesis posted a billboard in Texas with a young boy aiming a gun towards the viewer with the words, "If God doesn't matter to him, do you?" The same image was used in a TV ad. In 2014, the organization purchased space in Times Square to run a 15-second video advertisement addressed "To all of our intolerant liberal friends". According to AiG, the goal of the billboard was to "challenge the secularists who are increasingly intolerant of the Christian message". The Christian Relevant Magazine described the ad as "passive-aggressive" and "weirdly combative".

=== Great Homeschool Conventions ===
In March 2011, the Board of Great Homeschool Conventions, Inc. (a young-Earth Christian group) voted to disinvite Ken Ham and AiG from future conventions due to Ham's words about other Christians making "unnecessary, ungodly, and mean-spirited statements that are divisive at best and defamatory at worst". The controversy stemmed from Ham's commentary on the position expressed by Peter Enns, of The BioLogos Foundation, who advocated a symbolic rather than a literal interpretation of the fall of Adam and Eve. Writing on his blog, Ham accused Enns of espousing "outright liberal theology that totally undermines the authority of the Word of God", which led to his invitation being revoked.

=== Legal action by Creation Ministries International ===
On May 31, 2007, Creation Ministries International filed a lawsuit in Supreme Court of Queensland against Ken Ham and Answers in Genesis seeking damages and accusing him of "unbiblical/unethical/unlawful behaviour" in his dealings with the Australian organization. Before the split, the Australian group had been producing periodicals, Creation magazine and Journal of Creation, which were then distributed in other countries by local groups. The Australian group had no access to the list of subscribers in the US. AiG discontinued the distribution arrangement, and produced a new magazine of their own, called Answers, and represented that to subscribers as a replacement. Creation Ministries International claimed $252,000 (US) in damages for lost revenue by misleading and deceptive conduct in relating to lost subscriptions.

An editorial analysis of the situation, including reference to estranged co-founder John Mackay's allegations in 1986 of necrophilia and witchcraft against Ken Ham's personal secretary is offered in an account in the Reports of the National Center for Science Education. In February 2009, the United States Court of Appeals for the Sixth Circuit ordered Australian-based Creation Ministries International into arbitration with Answers in Genesis over copyrights and control of affiliates in other countries. In April 2009, the ministries reached a settlement and ended their dispute.

== See also ==
- Institute for Creation Research
- Bill Nye–Ken Ham debate
