= Keith B. Miller =

American geologist

Keith Brady Miller is professor of geology at Kansas State University in the United States. He is editor of Perspectives on an Evolving Creation (Eerdmans, 2003), an anthology of essays by prominent evangelical Christian scientists who accept theistic evolution (also called evolutionary creationism).

Since 2013, Miller has been listed on the Advisory Council of the National Center for Science Education.

He is also a prominent board member of the Kansas Citizens for Science, a not-for-profit educational organization that promotes a better understanding of science.
