= Economic development incentive =

Incentive to attract or retain business

An economic development incentive is known as "cash or near-cash assistance provided on a discretionary basis to attract or retain business operations." These benefits principally encompass tax and economic incentives provided by federal, state, or local governmental bodies. Entities such as utilities and non-profits, can also make incentives available for these purposes. They accord the recipient a monetary benefit (i.e., tax incentives) or an in-kind benefit (e.g., state regulatory releases of environmental liability, municipal infrastructure improvements). Private enterprises, including individuals, are generally the ultimate beneficiaries of economic development incentives. Depending on the incentive in question, other qualified parties are eligible to receive it, as in the case of municipalities, utilities, or economic development agencies.

== Types of incentives ==
The two types of economic development incentives are mandatory (also called automatic) and discretionary.

Mandatory benefits are generally tax incentives, which are established by tax laws and immediately triggered by a specified type of business activity. For example, the laws may be written to say that a business automatically qualifies for an exemption or rebate from sales tax when it purchases manufacturing equipment.

Discretionary incentives consist of either tax or economic benefits and can be established by law, by the policy of a public body or other entity, or by negotiation among transaction participants. For example, a local government and a business might negotiate a temporary reduction in property tax if the business undertakes an activity that the government wants, such as hiring more local residents or remediating a traffic problem.

== Examples ==
The following illustrates economic development incentives made available to private sector enterprises or other recipients:

- Industrial development bond financing, exempting interest from federal or state income taxes, for designated capital expenditures.
- Federal or state new markets income tax credits for qualified capital investment for low-income communities or for low-income persons.
- State or local taxable bond financing used to effect ad valorem property tax exemptions.
- Tax increment financing, allocating all or a portion of new taxes (i.e., ad valorem property taxes, sales taxes) generated by projects or capital investment for the direct or indirect benefit of a private enterprise.
- Federal or state job training grants are funded to local governments or private enterprises for the training of new employees or the re-training of existing employees.
- Refundable or non-refundable state income tax credits for job creation or retention, or capital investment, by private enterprises.
- Enterprise or development zones, exempting all or a portion of certain taxes otherwise imposed on property or business activity within the zone from state or local taxes.
- State and local low-interest or forgivable loans made available to private enterprises financing capital investment.
- State grants or subsidies by public bodies to private enterprises for new project development.
- Local property transfers to private enterprises at below market or nominal consideration.
- State and local grants for the rehabilitation of environmentally impacted sites (brownfields sites) are funded to local governments or private enterprises.
- Utility incentives provided by utilities or non-profits for capital investment.
- Local property tax exemptions for construction or retrofitting of buildings to qualify for LEED certifications.

== Considerations ==
A number of factors are considered in the adoption of economic development incentive programs by public bodies.

Public bodies can develop well-articulated strategies, guiding their adoption and implementation of economic development programs. For example, the federal government can offer tax credits, encouraging the development of renewable energy sources as a national initiative.

An uninformed observation about incentives could lead one to the conclusion that a jurisdiction with a weak business and employment base tends to offer more favorable incentives than one with a strong business and employment base. Although this correlation exists in certain instances, it is not necessarily an accurate reflection in each case of the approach public bodies take in allocating incentives to private enterprises. For instance, a state with a strong business and employment base can leverage its financial position to offer incentive packages to a certain business class as a way to participate in an emerging national business sector. Similarly, a municipality with a weak business and employment base can be reticent to offer economic development incentives because of financial and political consequences. A municipality fitting this profile could be receptive to providing incentives based on new project taxes, not otherwise available to it, generated by the recipient.

The level of competition among adjacent jurisdictions or local communities, or other entities (i.e. utilities) can impact the adoption and implementation of these programs. A state may legislate an aggressive incentive program to preempt adjacent states from luring inbound businesses to their jurisdictions. A local community may, however, offer economic development incentives merely as a defensive measure to maintain parity with adjacent communities. The composition of a state's or local community's economic base can be a factor in the adoption of incentive programs. A state may offer attractive incentive packages to an under-represented business class as a way to diversify its economy. Similarly, a local community can orient its incentive policies toward particular businesses in an effort to counterbalance its reliance on one business sector (e.g., manufacturing).

The state and local tax structure of a jurisdiction can affect the availability of incentives in the jurisdiction. A state may offer to private enterprises a variety of economic development incentives to offset a higher income or property tax regime. A jurisdiction with a low tax structure can be less inclined to promulgate aggressive incentive programs to benefit private enterprises.

A public body's experience with an incentive program can impact its approach toward incentive arrangements. Prior experience with an insolvent company enrolled in a program can prompt a public body to adopt rigorous prequalification criteria as part of its incentive screening process.

Different constituencies affected by economic development policies can also influence tax incentive programs or arrangements. Taxpayers often use the courts as a vehicle to challenge tax incentives. Taxing districts constitute another pool of opponents to these programs. For instance, certain school districts not infrequently challenge tax incentive programs or arrangements because of a reduction or loss of their tax revenue allocations. Other public bodies can oppose tax incentives, as in the case of county tax authorities, because of their impact on taxing districts and public services.

== Inducement tests ==
Discretionary incentive programs commonly include an inducement test as a criterion for eligibility, requiring potential recipients to demonstrate that the incentive has effectively motivated the intended business activity. The stringency of this test varies significantly among programs. On one end of the spectrum, a rigorous 'but for' test is employed, akin to those used in tax-exempt bond financing under federal tax law and in numerous state-taxable bond issuance programs. This test necessitates a demonstration that the business activity would not have occurred 'but for' the incentive. At the less stringent end, the test may simply require evidence of a general intention to engage in the targeted business activity, suggesting that the incentive played a role in the decision-making process.

In the context of discretionary incentive programs, private sector enterprises are often required to pass stringent inducement tests to qualify for specific incentives. These tests generally necessitate obtaining formal governmental approval, such as a resolution or ordinance, before the enterprise can proceed with any contractual arrangements on the incentivized activity. For instance, before waiving closing conditions on real estate purchases or entering into binding contracts for new projects, a business must secure a resolution or similar form of authorization for the incentive from the appropriate public authority.

== Clawbacks ==
State and local public bodies sometimes establish investment, employment, or other project commitments that must be met and maintained during a test period in exchange for discretionary incentives. Under these arrangements, the recipient must repay all or a portion of the benefit received, if it fails to meet or maintain the designated metric of performance during the test period. These recapture arrangements are commonly referred to as “clawbacks”.

In addition, non-governmental entities, such as utilities, can incorporate clawback provisions as part of their incentive packages. A utility offering an in-kind benefit to a private enterprise, such as the installation of on-site energy infrastructure improvements, can stipulate that the project must reach and maintain certain energy usage thresholds as a means for the utility to recover its investment. If the recipient fails to meet these requirements, the utility can assess a charge based on a prearranged formula analogous to a governmental clawback.

== Effectiveness ==
Some suggest that most incentives are relatively modest in relation to the incentivized business activity and, therefore, have no demonstrative impact on the recipient's decision-making. Incentive packages can constitute a meaningful contribution toward project investment. Business enterprises with incentive experience frequently include incentives as part of project site selection checklists and treat them as relevant budget line items.

Others question the net economic benefit to public bodies and local communities and the wisdom of the public policies promoting them. As a corollary, some argue economic development incentives merely facilitate the relocation of a private enterprise's business or employment from one venue to another venue and do not foster any new meaningful business activity. Under this line of reasoning, a recipient can relocate essentially the same operation from one community to another community in a jurisdiction by taking advantage of the other community's ad valorem property tax incentive program. Certain commentators can view business operations or facilities as easily portable from one jurisdiction or community to another. Business relocations can, however, require significant investment, resources, and personnel for planning and implementation. They can be disruptive to the business and undermine the morale of employees, if not properly managed.

== Criticism ==
Economic development incentives have come under scrutiny from many quarters.

Some commentators have also contended that these programs contribute to the corruption of public officials in their administration as a basis to discredit them. The media have accused some companies of flagrant conduct and mismanagement by certain public bodies, under these programs as a repudiation of economic development incentives.

=== Response ===
Federal, state, and local governmental bodies, by their nature, have individual agendas in the adoption of economic development programs, although they may be complementary. For instance, a state may promulgate legislation, mindful of its economic base as a whole, while regional development consortiums and local public bodies primarily focus their attention on more local considerations.

Economic development incentives vary in purpose and type. For instance, a utility incentive designed to foster economic development in a local community has distinctive characteristics and goals from an ad valorem property tax incentive used to encourage the redevelopment of blighted areas in that community.

Economic development incentives may also be viewed as merely promoting static business activity but as structures promoting and capturing the organic growth of the recipient at the project level and indirectly promoting the growth of related businesses. Public officials likely have this expectation in mind when authorizing economic development programs.

An argument has been made about the increasing reliance of the private sector in today's business environment on economic development incentives for business expansion or retention.

The sporadic occurrence of mismanagement or misuse of these programs by either public officials or private enterprises also often comes up. Oppositions, however, insist that this should not undermine their efficacy in promoting economic development as a whole.

== See also ==
- Discretionary Tax and Economic Incentives
- Ghetto - United States
- Economic Development
- Economic growth
- Revenue bonds
- Investment promotion agency
- Tax Increment Financing
- Tax Increment Reinvestment Zone
- Urban Decay
- Urban Enterprise Zone
- Urban Renewal
