= Creation Ministries International =

Young Earth creationist advocacy organization

- Abbreviation: CMI
- Formation: 1977 (under a different name)
- Type: Fundamentalist; Christian apologetics organization
- Legal status: Non-profit
- Location(s): Australia; Canada; New Zealand; Singapore; South Africa; United Kingdom; United States
- Website: creation.com

Creation Ministries International (CMI) is a nonprofit organisation that promotes the pseudoscience of young Earth creationism. It has branches in Australia, Canada, New Zealand, Singapore, South Africa, the United Kingdom, and the United States.

== History ==
In 1977, Carl Wieland organised the Creation Science Association (CSA) in Adelaide in South Australia. In 1978, the organisation began the magazine Ex Nihilo (from the Latin phrase creatio ex nihilo, meaning "creation out of nothing"). Soon after, the Creation Science Foundation (CSF) took over production of Ex Nihilo (later renaming it Creation Ex Nihilo, and eventually simply Creation). In 1984, CSF started the Ex Nihilo Technical Journal for more in-depth analysis of creationist issues (it was later renamed Creation Ex Nihilo Technical Journal, then simply TJ, and now the Journal of Creation).

In the mid-1990s, Ken Ham, formerly of the Creation Science Foundation and then part of the Institute for Creation Research, formed an autonomous ministry in the United States. This ministry, along with the Australian Creation Science Foundation, was branded "Answers in Genesis" (AiG); eventually, legally autonomous Answers in Genesis offices were opened in Canada, New Zealand, South Africa, and the United Kingdom.

Following a legal dispute in 2005, AiG split in 2006. The Australia, Canada, New Zealand, and South Africa branches re-branded as "Creation Ministries International".

In late 2006, CMI established offices in the UK and the United States. Since then, CMI has distributed Creation magazine and the Journal of Creation in the United States itself.

CMI publishes Creation magazine and the Journal of Creation. Creation reports that it has subscribers in more than 170 countries, with 60,000 copies of each issue produced. Creation is published four times a year. The Journal of Creation is published three times a year; CMI claims that it is peer reviewed, but the scientific community does not consider this to be so since the peer review is only held within a closed circle of CMI members and the peer reviewers for issues are not disclosed for verification of peer review rigor.

== The Voyage That Shook the World ==
The Voyage That Shook The World is a 2009 dramatised documentary film commissioned by Creation Ministries International and produced by Fathom Media. It was released to mark the 200th anniversary of Charles Darwin's birth and the 150th anniversary of the publication of his seminal work On the Origin of Species.

This 52-minute-long film includes interviews with proponents of intelligent design and young Earth creationism along with some scholars, academics, and scientists who support the scientific consensus on evolution. Some of the mainstream scientists later said that the filmmakers deceptively edited their interviews and misled them. It features wildlife footage from the Galapagos Islands as well as on-location footage from Argentina, Chile, Tierra del Fuego, and the United Kingdom. The film's dramatised sequences were shot on location in Tasmania, Australia. The National Center for Science Education reviewed the film and found it misleading.

== Legal controversy with Answers in Genesis ==
CMI's history is closely linked with that of its daughter ministry in the United States, Answers in Genesis (AiG), founded by former Australian colleague Ken Ham. A legal and personal dispute broke out between the Australian and US arms of AiG in 2005, involving claims of unethical dealing in handling magazine subscriptions and autocratic leadership on Ham's part. A more involved analysis of the situation is described in an account in the Reports of the National Center for Science Education.

A lawsuit was filed on 31 May 2007, by CMI in Supreme Court of Queensland against Ken Ham and Answers in Genesis, seeking damages and accusing "unbiblical/unethical/unlawful behaviour" in Ham's dealings with the Australian organisation.

CMI produces Creation Magazine and the Journal of Creation, formerly distributed by the US and UK AiG offices to their respective countries prior to the split. The Australian group maintains it was disconnected from all its American subscribers when the US office "announced on its web site (without telling us, the publishers) that it was ceasing to distribute both of these publications (and simultaneously announced its own magazine)". CMI further alleged in the lawsuit that AiG misrepresented their own magazine to subscribers as a replacement for Creation. CMI is claiming $252,000 (US) in damages for lost revenue by misleading and deceptive conduct in relating to lost subscriptions. The case also concerns use of the trademark "Answers in Genesis" within Australia, and alleged misuse by Ken Ham of his position as a director for the Australian group to cause it detriment.

Answers in Genesis had little to say in public to these accusations, but in comments to news reporters, Ken Ham dismissed them all as "totally preposterous and untrue".

In February 2009, the United States Court of Appeals for the Sixth Circuit ordered Australian-based Creation Ministries International into arbitration in the United States with Answers in Genesis (as sought by AiG) over copyrights and control of affiliates in other countries.

In April 2009, the ministries reached a settlement and ended their dispute.

== Relationship with schools ==
In 2011, a group of 30 UK scientists accused the organisation's representatives of falsely presenting themselves to schools as scientists.
