= Doug Kirby =

American writer (born 1957)

Douglas Kirby
- Born: Douglas John Kirby; October 19, 1957 (age 68); New Jersey, U.S.
- Education: Rowan University
- Occupation: Writer
- Writing career
- Genre: Non-fiction
- Subject: Travel

Douglas John Kirby is the co-author of the Roadside America series of travel books, and its associated website. The series has been reviewed by The Village Voice and Car and Driver, and was featured on The Oprah Winfrey Show. Kirby appears in the documentary In a Nutshell: A Portrait of Elizabeth Tashjian. He graduated from Rowan University in 1979.
