= Jim Lippard =

American skeptic and activist freethinker

James Joseph Lippard (born 1965) is an American skeptic and activist freethinker.

Lippard works for Global Crossing as its head of information security.

He founded the Phoenix Skeptics in 1985 and was its executive director until 1988, and edited The Arizona Skeptic from 1991–1993. He is the former president (2003–2005) of the Internet Infidels and former webmaster for the Skeptics Society (1994 to 1997).

Lippard is the author of The Fabulous Prophecies of the Messiah on the Secular Web, and a contributor to Ed Babinski's Leaving the Fold: Testimonies of Former Fundamentalists, to Joe Nickell's Psychic Sleuths: ESP and Sensational Cases, Gordon Stein's Encyclopedia of the Paranormal, and to Skeptic magazine and Reports of the National Center for Science Education.

== Popular culture ==
Lippard was portrayed by actor James Lloyd Reynolds in a 2018 episode of the American TV series Homeland titled "Useful Idiot."
