= International Conference on Creationism =

The International Conference on Creationism (ICC) is a conference in support of young Earth creationism, sponsored by the Creation Science Fellowship (CSF). The first conference occurred in 1986 at Duquesne University in Pittsburgh. Subsequent conferences have been held in 1990, 1994, 1998, 2003, 2008, 2013 and 2018.

== Conferences ==
1986 Conference

Austin, S., Mount St. Helens and Catastrophism
Austin, S., Tight Folds and Clastic Dikes as Evidence for Rapid Deposition and Deformation
Avila, R., Is the Precession of Mercury's Perihelion a Natural (Non-Relativistic) Phenomenon?
Baumgartner, J., Numerical Simulation of the Large-Scale Tectonic Changes Accompanying the Flood
Bergman, J., The Problem of Time
Bixler, R. Does the Bible Speak of a Vapor Canopy
Brown, R., Radiometric Dating from the Perspective of Biblical Chronology
Brown, W., The Fountains of the Great Deep
Cook, M., How and When Pangea Ruptured and Continents Shifted
Frangos, A. Ch., The Great Delusion
Gentry, R., Radioactive Halos: Implications for Creation
Gish, D., The Origin of Life
Humphreys, R., Reversals of the Earth's Magnetic Field During the Genesis Flood
Jue, D.S., The Myths of Cranial Capacity and Intelligence
Lester, L. & Bohlin, R., After His Kind: The Biological Unit of Creation
Lucas, C., A New Unified Theory of Modern Science
Morris, J., Identification of Ichnofossils in the Glen Rose Limestone, Central Texas
Morton, G., Geologic Challenges to a Young Earth
Northrup, B., A Walk Through Time: A Study in Harmonization
Northrup, B., There Really Was An Ice Age
Oard, M., An Ice Within the Biblical Time Frame
Overn, W., Radiometric Dating - An Unconvincing Art
Overn, W., The Truth About Radiometric Dating
Reed, J.G., Stretching Time: The Magic In Evolution
Vardiman, L., The Age of the Earth's Atmosphere Estimated by Its Helium Content
Vardiman, L., The Sky Has Fallen
Walsh, R., Biblical Hermeneutics and Creation
Whitelaw, R., Recent Creation and Worldwide Flood: The Perfect Agreement Between Biblical Chronology, Recorded History, and Other Extra-Biblical Geochronometers
Wise, K., How Fast Do Rocks Form
Wise, K., The Way Geologists Date!
Woodmorappe, J., The Antidiluvian Biosphere and Its Capability of Supplying the Entire Fossil Record

Robert Schadewald emphasized the influence Kurt Wise has had on shaping a more candid and rigorous approach to creationism, particularly praising a talk entitled "How Geologists Date Things" as absolutely straight Geology 101 mixing introductory geology with a debunking of creationist misconceptions. Wise has labored tirelessly by example and persuasion to convince his creationist colleagues to study the facts carefully and find new ways to interpret them. Besides technical and educational tracks, ICC86 featured a "basic creationism" track that included Walter Brown's Hydroplate Model (some creationists privately referred to it as the "wacky track").

1990 Conference

Aardsma, Radiocarbon, Dendrochronology and the Date of the Flood
Ackerman, Paul D., Human Creativity or Biblical Creation?
Arndts, Russell T., Logic and The Interpretation of Fossils

Austin, S. & Humphreys, R., The Sea's Missing Salt: A Dilemma for Evolutionists
Baumgartner, J., 3-D Simulation of the Global Tectonic Changes During Noah's Flood
Bergman, Jerry, The Biological Theory of Atavism and its Influence on Social Policy
Bergman, Jerry, The Fall of the Natural Selection Theory
Chaffin, A Study of Roemer's Method for Determining the Velocity of Light
Chittick, Donald E., Age of the Earth: Biblical & Scientific Implications
Clark & Voss, Resonance and Sedimentary Layering in the Context of a Global Flood
Davey, Eigenvalue Analysis of the Magnetic Field of the Earth and Its Implications on Age and Field Reversals
DeYoung, The Earth-Moon System
Dritt, James O., Ph.D., Man's Earliest Beginnings: Discrepancies in Evolutionary Timetables
Dusenbury, A Reconsideration of the Photoelectric Effect Alpha Decay
Eidsmoe, John, The Evolutionary Worldview and American Law
Frangos, Apostolos Ch., Some Necessary Remarks on Scientific Knowledge
Hedtke, Randall, Should Students Be Taught How To Question The Evolution Evidence?
Holroyd, Cavitation Processes During Catastrophic Floods
Holroyd, Missing Talus on the Colorado Plateau
Humphreys, R., A Physical Mechanism for Reversals of the Earth's Magnetic Field During the Flood
Jorgenson, Technical Feasibility of the Biblical Canopy
Miller, The Paluxy River Footprints Revisited
Molen, Diamictites: Ice Ages or Gravity Flows
Myers, Ellen, M.A., The Breakdown of Philosophy and the Modern Evolution-Creation Debate
Northrup, Bernard E., Identifying the Noahic Flood in Historical Geology: Part One
Northrup, Bernard E., Identifying the Noahic Flood in Historical Geology: Part Two
Oard, M., The Evidence for Only One Ice Age
Paiva & Slusher, Cavitation: An Integral Agent of Energetic Geomorphological Process
ReMine, Discontinuity Systematics: A New Methodology of Biosystematics Relevant to the Creation Model
Reynolds, John M., Creationism and the Armies of the Night: A Response to Dr. Isaac Asimov
Rugg, Detachment Faults in the Southwestern United States: Evidences for a Short and Catastrophic Tertiary Period
Rush & Vardiman, Pre-Flood Vapor Canopy Radiative Temperature Profiles
Scheven, Joachim, Stasis in the Fossil Record as Confirmation of a Belief in Biblical Creation
Scheven, Joachim, The Flood / Post Flood Boundary in the Fossil Record
Stillman, The Lifetime and Renewal of Comets
Swift, Dennis L., The Rocks Begin to Speak
Taylor, Ian T., Effectively Sowing the Seeds of Doubt: The Age of the Earth
Taylor, Ian T., The Ultimate Hoax: Archaeopteryx Lithographica
Tyler, A Tectonically Controlled Rock Cycle
Vardiman, L., The Mechanism of Ice Crystal Growth and the Theory of Evolution
von Fange, Erich A., Are There Two Potassium / Argon Dating Systems
Whitmore, The Hartford Basin of Central Connecticut: Multiple Evidences of Catastrophism
Wilkerson & Wakefield, The Geological Setting of Polonium Halos
Wise, K., Baraminology: A Biosystematic Method Specific to a Young Earth Creation Model
Woodmorappe, J., Causes for the Biogeographic Distribution of Land Vertebrates after the Flood

The second ICC, held in 1990, was marginally better, but evolution-bashing and "wacky track" nonsense still were abundant. The 1990 conference featured a debate between Gregg Wilkerson, an old-earth creationist geologist and Steven A. Austin, chairman of geology at the Institute for Creation Research. Wilkerson urged the conference attendees to drop the young Earth viewpoint and accept the "ample scientific evidence" that the Earth is 4.5 billion years old. Austin stated that Wilkerson was misinterpreting the data and that a young Earth viewpoint remained feasible.

1994 Conference

Aardsma, Gerald E., Search for Radiocarbon in Coal
Aardsma, Gerald E., The Exodus Happened 2450 B.C.
Ackerman, Paul D., Preventing Out-of-Wedlock Teenage Pregnancy: Current Practice Versus the Experimental Social Psychology Research Base
Auldaney, Jeremy, Catastrophic Fluvial Deposition at the Asphalt Seeps of Rancho La Brea, California
Austin, Steven A. & Wise, Kurt P., Pre-Flood / Flood Boundary: As Defined in Grand Canyon and East Mojave
Barnette, Daniel W., & Baumgardner, John R., Patterns of Ocean Circulation Over the Continents During Noah's Flood
Baumgardner, John R., Computer Modeling of the Large Scale Tectonics Associated with the Genesis Flood
Baumgardner, John R., Runaway Subduction as the Driving Mechanism for the Genesis Flood
Bergman, Jerry, An Update of the Courts, Academic Freedom and Creationists: The Peloza, Johnson, and Bishop Cases
Bergman, Jerry, Magnetic Monopoles and Grand Unification Theory
Berthault, Guy, Experiments on Stratification
Boudreaux, Edward A., Particle Interaction Analysis of Solar Formation and Stabilization
Brown, Robert H., Mixing Lines - Considerations Regarding Their Use in Creationist Interpretation of Radioisotope Age Data
Cadwallader, Mark W., A Biblical Creation Model and Response for Environmental Difficulties
Chaffin, Eugene F., Are Fundamental Constants of Physics Really Variables?
Clark, M. E. & Voss, H.D., Towards and Understanding of the Tidal Fluid Mechanics Associated with the Genesis Flood
Culp, G. Richard, Do Birds of Prey Demonstrate Stability of Species?
Davies, Keith, Distribution of Supernova Remnants in the Galaxy
Fischer, J. Michael, A Giant Meteorite Impact and Rapid Continental Drift
Forgay, Warren F., Values Clarification: An Evaluation
Frangos, Apostolos Ch., A Different Approach to the Problem of Scientific Knowledge
Green, Terry R., Prescience Prophecy: A Pyrrhic Victory
Harsh, Robert W., Biblical Naturalism: A Time for Paradigm Change
Holroyd, III, Edmond W., A Remote Sensing Search for Extinct Lake Shore Lines on the Colorado Plateau
Humphreys, D. Russell, Progress Toward a Young-Earth Relativistic Cosmology
Humphreys, D. Russell, A Biblical Basis for Creationist Cosmology
Jorgensen, Greg S., The Canopy, the Moon, the Earth's Tilt and Pre-Flood Ice Age
Lucas, Charles W., Jr., with Lucas, Joseph C., The Origin of Atomic Structure
Lumsden, Richard D., and Francis, Noel D., Evolutionary Origin of Life Scenarios: Paradox of the Plasma Membrane
Maas, Frank, Immune Functions of the Vermiform Appendix
McLeod, Kevin C., Knee Design: Implications for Creation vs. Evolution
Molen, Mot, Mountain Building and Continental Drift
Montgomery, Alan, A Determination and Analysis of Appropriate Values of the Speed of Light to Test the Setterfield Hypothesis
Myers, Ellen, Creation: The Key to History
Northrup, Bernard E., Some Questionable Creationist Axioms Reexamined
Oard, Michael J., Submarine Mass Flow Deposition of Pre-Pleistocene Ice-Age Deposits
Palmer, Suzanne S., Lack of Evidence for Hand Dominance in the Nonhuman Primate: Difficulty for the Theory of Evolution
Powell, C. Diane, Mechanisms for Gender Role Stasis
ReMine, Walter J., The Biotic Message: An Introduction
Reynolds, John Mark, Gosse and Omphalos: The Bible & Science
Reynolds, John Mark, The Bible and Science: Toward a Rational Harmonization
Scherer, Siegfried, Basic Types of Life
Snelling, Andrew A., Regional Metamorphism within a Creationist Framework: Garnet Composition
Snelling, Andrew A., U-TH-PB: An Example of False Isochrons
Speck, Patricia L., The Kidney: A Designed System for Plasma Homeostasis
Spencer, Wayne R., The Origin and History of the Solar System
Taylor, Ian, Sir Francis Bacon & The Geological Society of London
Tyler, David J., Tectonic Controls on Sedimentation in Rocks from the Jurassic Series in Yorkshire, England
Tyler, Sheena E. B., The Genesis Kinds: A Perspective from Embryology
Vardiman, Larry, A Conceptual Transition Model of the Atmospheric Global Circulation Following the Genesis Flood
Vardiman, Larry, An Analytical Young-Earth Flow model of Ice Sheet Formation During the Ice Age
Walker, Tasman Bruce, A Biblical Geologic Model
Wise, K.; Austin, S.; Baumgardner, John R.; Humphreys, R.; Snelling, A.; Vardiman, L., Catastrophic Plate Tectonics: A Global Flood Model of Earth History
Wisniewski, Mark. E., The World-View Approach to Critical Thinking
Woodmorappe, John, The Biota and Logistics of Noah's Ark
Young, Judy A., Archaeology and Creation Science

Following ICC90, the Pittsburgh Creation Science Fellowship (CSF) established a refereeing system. Wise and philosophers Paul Nelson and John Mark Reynolds convinced CSF that evolution-bashing never has advanced and never will advance a real "creation model." As a result, ICC94 was dramatically better.

1998 Conference

Ackerman, P., Worldview of Aquinas, Luther, and Calvin: Modern Message Theory and the Creation Model
Akridge, J., A Flood-Based Origin of Little River Canyon near Ft. Payne, Alabama
Armitage, M., Complex Life Cycles In Heterphyid Trematodes...
Austin, S. & Snelling, A., Discordant K-Ar Model and Isochron Ages
Bergman, D., Conflict of Atomism and Creationism in History
Bergman, J., The Unbridgeable Chasm Between Prokaryotes and Eukaryotes
Bielecki, J., Search for Accelerated Nuclear Decay and Spontaneous Fission of (238) U
Brown, R., Metorites and a Young Earth
Cuozzo, J., What Happens to the Craniofacial Structure .. Neandertals
Curtis, W., A New Look at Genesis 1-5: A Coherent Model of Natural and Biblical History
Curtis, W., A New Look at Genesis 6-11: A Coherent Model of Natural and Biblical History
Deckard, S., Toward the Development of an Instrument for Measuring a Christian Creationist Worldview
Dennis, P., Probability and Quantum Mechanics
Faulkner, D., State of Creation Astronomy (The)
Fouts, D. & Wise, K., Blotting Out and Beaking Up: Hebrew Studies...
Frair, W., Effects of the 1981 Arkansas Trial on the Creationist Movement
Fritsche, T., Impact of the Cretaceous / Tertiary Boundary (The)
Goertzen, J., Rhamphorhynchoid Pterosaur Scaphognathus Crassirostris (The)...
Guikema, A., K-Ar Derived (238) U Fission Decay Constants...
Holroyd, E., Charcoal Bedding as a Tool for Stratigraphic Interpretation
Honeyman, J., Biblical Chronology and Egyptian History
Horstmeyr, M., Use of History Dependent Material Models for Simulating Geophysical Events
Houser, R., Creation Jurisprudence as a Means to Discover the Divinely Created Natural Law
Javor, G., Life, An Evidence for Creation
Kaufmann, D., Two Natures of DNA: Conceptless Code and Conceptual Aliveness
Kenyon, D., Hierarchal Information Content...in Coding and Non-Coding DNA Sequences
Klevberg, P. & Oard, M., Palehydrology of the Cypress Hills Formation and Flaxville Gravel
Lucas, C. & Lucas, J., A New Foundation for Modern Science
More, E., Created Kind (The): Noah's Doves, Ravens, and Their Descendants
Montgomery, A., Towards a Biblically Inerrant Chronology
Oard, M. & Klevberg, P., A Diluvial Interpretation of the Cypress Hills Formation, Flaxville Gravel, and Related Deposits
Overman, R., Comparing Origins Belief and Moral Values
Powell, D., Man & Message Theory: The Social Implications
Robinson, S., Flood in Genesis (The): What Does the Text Say?
Rugg, S. & Austin, S., Evidences for Rapid Formation and Failure of Pleistocene Lava Dams...
Sigler, R. & Wingerden, V., Submarine Flows and Slide Deposits in the Kingston Peak.
Snelling, A., Cause of Anaomalous K-Ar Ages for Recent Andesite Flows (The)...
Snelling A. & Woodmorappe, J.. Cooling of Thick Igneous Bodies on a Young Earth (The)
Speck, P., Paradox of Pregnancy: A Tribute to Design
Spencer, W., Catastrophic Impact Bombardment Surrounding the Genesis Flood
Spencer, W., Geophysical Effects of Impacts During the Genesis Flood
Stewart, A., Global Iodine Deficiency Disorders in the Light of the Biblical Flood
Vardiman, L, & Bousselot, K., Sensitivity Studies of Vapor Canopy Temperature Profiles
Vardiman, L., Numerical Simulation of Precipitation Induced Hot Mid-Ocean Ridges
Wise, K., Is Life Singularly Nested or Not?
Wise, K. & Cooper, M., A Compelling Creation: A Suggestion for a New Apologetic
Woodmorappe, J., Hypercanes a Cause of the 40 Day Global Flood Rainfall

At ICC98, the transformation was virtually complete. Most presentations tried either to advance a model in some way or at least to honestly review the evidence that needs explaining. This requirement was stated in the call for papers and enforced in the refereeing process, Anyone whose only exposure to creationism is a Gish Gallop would not have recognized a single presentation at ICC98. Larry Witham described it as having "become the preeminent meeting of its kind in the world." Its goal is to provide a peer-review forum wherein the Creation model could be rigorously developed. He states that the conferences express similar disdain for both "slipshod" populist young earth creationism, and for smuggling in "antiquity and evolution". He describes as "astounding" their presupposition that God "used processes which are not now operating anywhere in the natural universe." They state they cannot discover by scientific investigation anything about the creative processes used by the Creator.

== Reception ==
Mathematics professor Jason Rosenhouse writes expressing sadness that while generally impressed with attendees "personality and temperament", that they are "hopelessly ignorant of science. This ignorance is exacerbated by the annoying fact that so many of them fancy themselves highly knowledgeable indeed."
