= Duane Gish =

American creationist (1921–2013)

- Born: Duane Tolbert Gish; February 17, 1921; White City, Kansas, U.S.
- Died: 5 March 2013 (aged 92); San Diego, California, U.S.
- Education: University of California, Los Angeles (BS); University of California, Berkeley (MA, PhD)
- Employer(s): University of California, Berkeley; Cornell University; Institute for Creation Research
- Known for: Prominent public speaker on creationism
- Military career
- Allegiance: United States
- Branch: United States Army
- Service years: 1941–1945
- Rank: Captain
- Conflicts: World War II
- Awards: Bronze Star Medal

Duane Tolbert Gish (February 17, 1921 – March 5, 2013) was an American biochemist and a prominent member of the creationist movement. A young Earth creationist, Gish was a former vice-president of the Institute for Creation Research (ICR) and the author of numerous publications about creation science.

Gish was called "creationism's T. H. Huxley" for the way he "relished the confrontations" of formal debates with prominent evolutionary biologists, usually held on university campuses, while abandoning formal debating principles, in a style that came to be known as the Gish gallop. A creationist publication noted in his obituary that "it was perhaps his personal presentation that carried the day. In short, the audiences liked him."

== Biography ==
=== Early life and education ===
Gish, a twin, was born in White City, Kansas, the youngest of nine children. He served in World War II, attaining the rank of captain, and was awarded the Bronze Star.

Gish graduated from the University of California, Los Angeles, with a Bachelor of Science in 1949. He then earned a Ph.D. in biochemistry from the University of California, Berkeley, in 1953. His doctoral dissertation was titled, "I. The application of p-nitrobenzyl chloroformate to peptide synthesis. II. Para-nitrobenzyloxycarbonyl derivatives of amino acids. III. A method of synthesis of arginyl peptides".

=== Career ===
After receiving his doctorate, Gish worked as an assistant research associate at Berkeley, and as an assistant professor at Cornell University Medical College for eighteen years, joining the Upjohn Company as a research associate in 1960.

== Creationism ==
A Methodist from age ten, and later a fundamentalist Baptist, Gish believed that the Genesis creation narrative was historical fact. After reading the booklet Evolution, "Science Falsely So-called" in the late 1950s, Gish became persuaded that science had produced falsifiable evidence against evolutionary theory, particularly the origin of life, and that various fields of science offered corroborating evidence in support of the Genesis creation narrative. He joined the American Scientific Affiliation (ASA), an association of Christian scientists, mistakenly assuming the group supported creationism. Through his affiliation at the ASA, Gish met geneticist and creationist William J. Tinkle, who in 1961 invited Gish to join a newly formed anti-evolution caucus within the ASA.

In 1971, Gish became a member of the faculty at San Diego Christian College, working in its research division before accepting a position at the Institute for Creation Research (independent since 1981). He was the author of several books and articles espousing creationism. His best-known work, Evolution: The Fossils Say No!, published in 1972, has been widely accepted by creationists as an authoritative reference. Gish initially "assigned low priority to the question of [the] age [of the Earth]".

At his death on March 5, 2013, Gish held the position of Senior Vice-President Emeritus at the ICR.

== Debates ==
Gish's debating opponents said that he used a rapid-fire approach during a debate, presenting arguments and changing topics quickly. Eugenie Scott, executive director of the National Center for Science Education, dubbed this approach the "Gish gallop", describing it as "where the creationist is allowed to run on for 45 minutes or an hour, spewing forth torrents of error that the evolutionist hasn't a prayer of refuting in the format of a debate". She also criticized Gish for failing to answer objections raised by his opponents.

However, Gish said a similar thing about his debate opponents, especially Kenneth Miller. Gish accused Miller of using spread debating, i.e. speaking very fast and bringing up so many points that there was no chance to answer them all.

Gish was also criticized for using a standardized presentation during debates. While undertaking research for a debate with Gish, Michael Shermer noted that Gish re-used similar openings, assumptions about his opponent, slides, and even jokes. For example, during the debate, Gish attempted to prove that Shermer was indeed an atheist and therefore immoral, even though Shermer said he was not an atheist and was willing to accept the existence of a divine creator. Massimo Pigliucci, who debated Gish five times, said that Gish ignored evidence contrary to his religious beliefs. Robert Schadewald accused Gish of stonewalling arguments with fabricated data.

== Works ==
- Gish, Duane T. 15 Scopus Publishers.
- Gish, Duane T. (1972). Speculations and Experiments on the Origins of Life. New Leaf Pr. ISBN 0-89051-010-5.
- Gish, Duane T. (1972). Evidence against evolution. Wheaton, Ill: Tyndale House Publishers. ISBN 0-8423-0790-7.
- Gish, Duane T. (1986) [1972]. Evolution, the fossils say no!. San Diego, Calif: Institute for Creation Research Publishing. ISBN 0-89051-057-1.
- Gish, Duane T. (1973). Have You Been... Brainwashed?. Seattle, Washington: Life Messengers. p. 32. OCLC 10930514.
- Hillestad, George M.; Morris, Henry; Gish, Duane T. (1974). Creation: acts, facts, impacts. San Diego, Calif: ICR Pub. Co. ISBN 0-89051-020-2.
- Gish, Duane T. (1977). Dinosaurs: Those Terrible Lizards. Green forest, Arkansas: Master Books. ISBN 0-89051-039-3.
- Rohrer, Donald H.; Gish, Duane T. (1978). Up with creation!: ICR acts/facts/impacts, 1976-1977. San Diego, California: Creation-Life Publishers. ISBN 0-89051-048-2.
- Gish, Duane T.; Wilson, Clifford (1981). Manipulating life, where does it stop?: Genetic engineering. Green Forest, Arkansas: Master Books. ISBN 0-89051-071-7.
- Gish, Duane T. (1985). Evolution: the challenge of the fossil record. San Diego, Calif: Creation-Life Publishers. ISBN 0-89051-112-8.
- Gish, Duane T. (1988). Creationist Research 1964-1988. Creation Research Society. ISBN 0-940384-06-X.
- Bonnie Snellenberger; Gish, Duane T.; D Dish; Earl Snellenberger (1990). The Amazing Story of Creation: From Science and the Bible. Green Forest, Arkansas: Master Books. ISBN 0-89051-120-9.
- Gloria Clanin; Gish, Duane T.; Earl Snellenberger; Bonita Snellenberger (1992). Dinosaurs by Design. Green Forest, Arkansas: Master Books. ISBN 0-89051-165-9.
- D. Gish (1993). Creation Scientists Answer Their Critics. El Cajon, California: Institute for Creation Research. ISBN 0-932766-28-5.
- Gish, Duane T. (1995). Teaching Creation Science in Public Schools. El Cajon, Calif: Institute for Creation Research. ISBN 0-932766-36-6.
- Gish, Duane T. (1995). Evolution: The Fossils Still Say No!. Master Books. p. 277. ISBN 0-89051-112-8.

== See also ==
- Flood geology
- Monty White
