= Creation Museum =

Museum in Kentucky promoting creationism

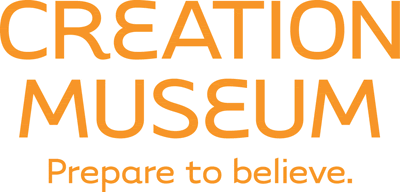

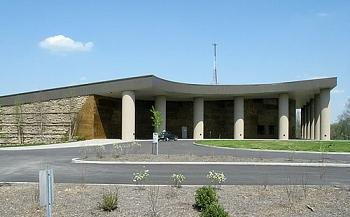
- The front of the Creation Museum

- Location within Kentucky Location within the United States
- Established: May 28, 2007
- Location: Petersburg, Kentucky, U.S.
- Coordinates: 39°05′10″N 84°47′00″W
- Type: Creation apologetics ministry
- Visitors: 254,074 (2011)
- Founder: Ken Ham
- Owner: Answers in Genesis
- Website: creationmuseum.org

The Creation Museum, located in Petersburg, Kentucky, United States, is a museum that promotes a pseudoscientific form of Young Earth creationism (YEC), portraying the origin of the universe and life on Earth based on a literal interpretation of the Genesis creation narrative of the Bible. It is operated by the Christian creation apologetics organization Answers in Genesis (AiG).

The 75,000-square-foot (7,000 m^{2}) museum cost US$27 million, raised through private donations, and opened on May 28, 2007. In addition to the main collection, the facility has a special effects theater, a planetarium, an Allosaurus skeleton and an insect collection. As the headquarters of AiG, the museum has approximately 300 employees, and permanent employees must sign a statement of faith affirming their belief in AiG's principles.

Reflecting young-Earth creationist beliefs, the museum depicts humans and dinosaurs coexisting, portrays the Earth as approximately 6,000 years old, and disputes the theory of evolution. Scientists, educators, and theologians have criticized the museum for misrepresenting science and expressed concerns that it could harm science education, and even some Christians have expressed concern that its rejection of scientific consensus could damage the credibility of Christianity and its adherents. Tenets of young-Earth creationism enjoy moderate support among the general population in the United States, however, contributing to the museum's popularity.

The museum is controversial and has received much commentary from cultural observers and the museum community. Scholars of museum studies, like Gretchen Jennings, have said that creationist exhibitions lack "valid connection with current worldwide thinking on their chosen discipline" and with "human knowledge and experience", and are not in their view museums at all.

== Background ==
The Creation Museum portrays a literal interpretation of the creation narrative from the Book of Genesis in the Bible using creation science, a pseudoscientific form of young Earth creationism (YEC). It is owned and operated by Answers in Genesis (AiG), a creation apologetics organization. According to the AiG website, the purpose of the museum is to "exalt Jesus Christ as Creator, Redeemer, and Sustainer", to "equip Christians to better evangelize the lost", and to "challenge visitors to receive Jesus Christ as Savior and Lord". AiG founder Ken Ham said: "We're not out to convert people to believing in Intelligent Design. We're not out to convert people to not believe in evolution. And we're not out to just convert people to being Creationists. We're Christians."

YEC, the belief that the God of the Bible created the Universe and everything in it in six 24-hour days, approximately 6,000 years ago, contradicts the scientific consensus that the Earth is approximately 4.5 billion years old and that living organisms come into being by descent from common ancestors through evolution. A Sunday Independent columnist said in 2007 that "there are plenty of Americans ready to embrace Ham and support his museum", citing the fact that the $27 million museum was entirely privately funded and citing a Gallup public opinion poll showing widespread belief among Americans in biblical accounts of human origins. A similar poll conducted by Pew Research Center in 2016 found that 35% of Americans agreed with the statement "humans and other living things have existed in their present form since the beginning of time".

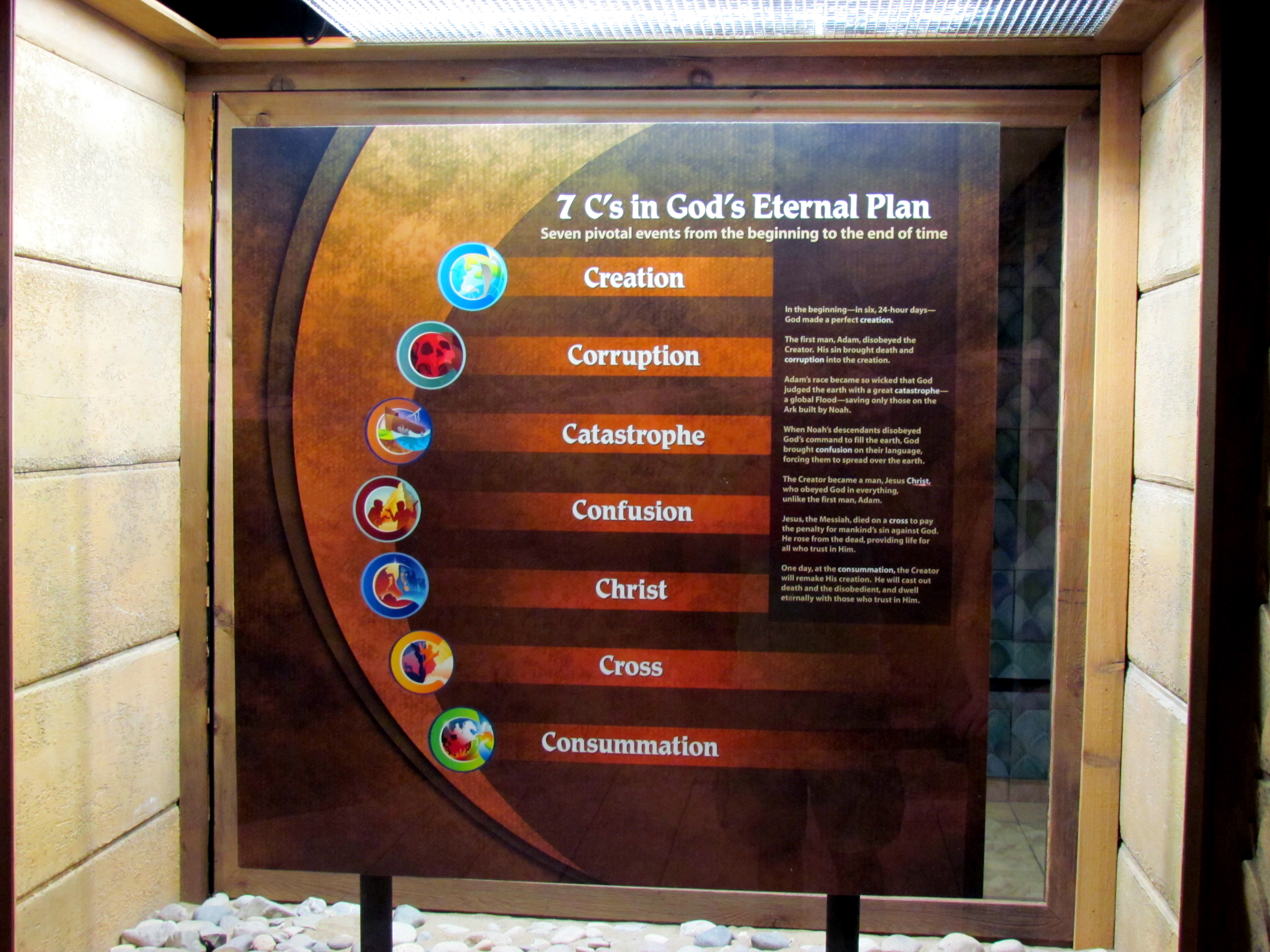
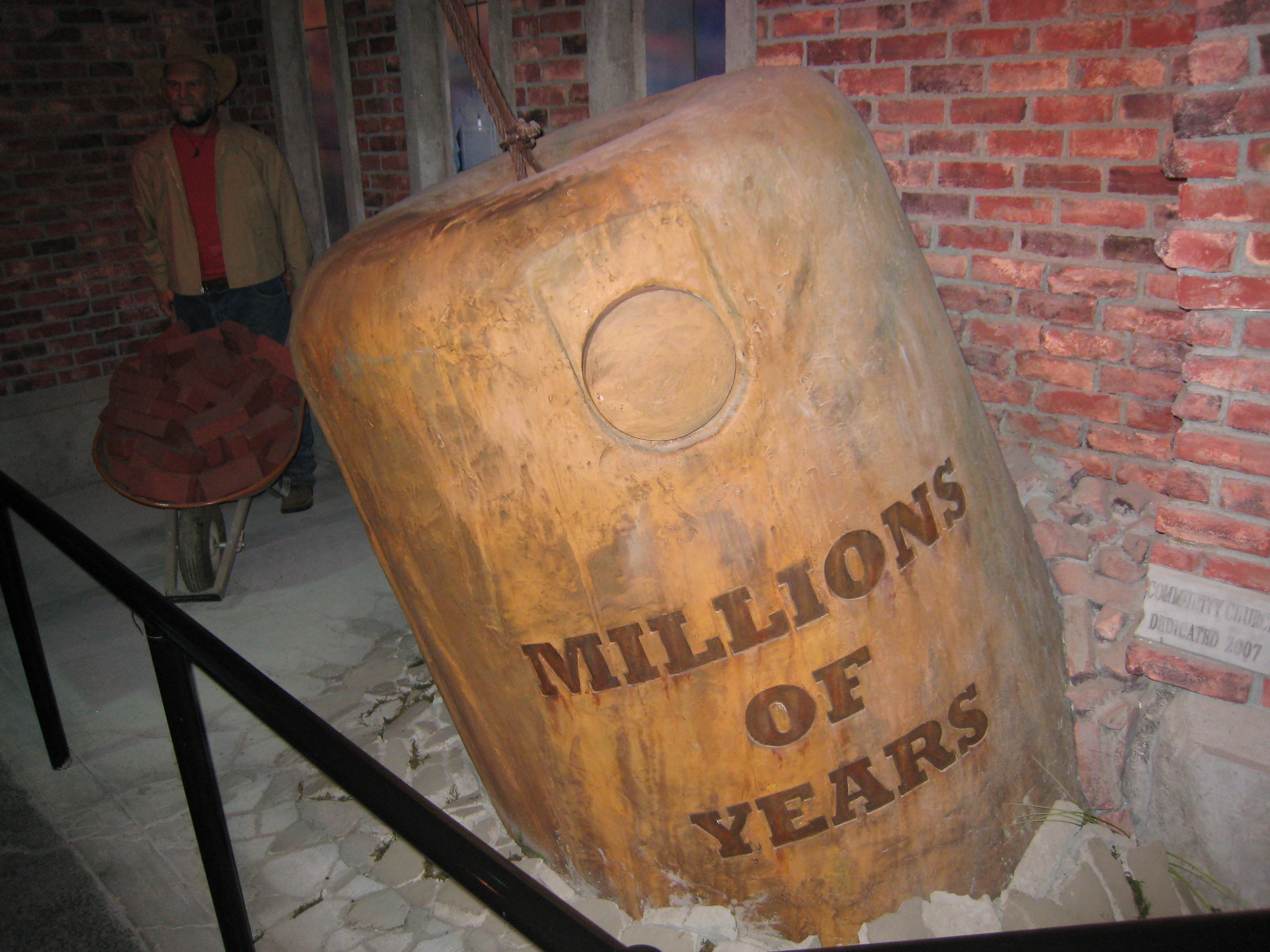
Displays at the Creation Museum present AiG's views of the world. Left: "7 C's in God's Eternal Plan": Creation, Corruption, Catastrophe, Confusion, Christ, Cross, Consummation. Right: A wrecking ball labeled "millions of years" smashing the brick foundation of a church to represent the abandonment of Biblical literalism in the modern world. Behind the ball is a Ken Ham mannequin pushing a wheelbarrow full of bricks, a metaphor for the work of AiG.

== History ==
From the time AiG was founded in Florence, Kentucky, in 1994, the group's officials planned to open a museum and training center in the area. Ken Ham, a native of Australia, said that "Australia's not really the place to build such a facility if you're going to reach the world. Really, America is." In a separate interview with The Sydney Morning Herald's Paul Sheehan, Ham explained, "One of the main reasons [AiG] moved [to Florence] was because we are within one hour's flight of 69 percent of America's population." The museum is located in Petersburg, Kentucky, 4 miles (6.4 km) west of the Cincinnati/Northern Kentucky International Airport.

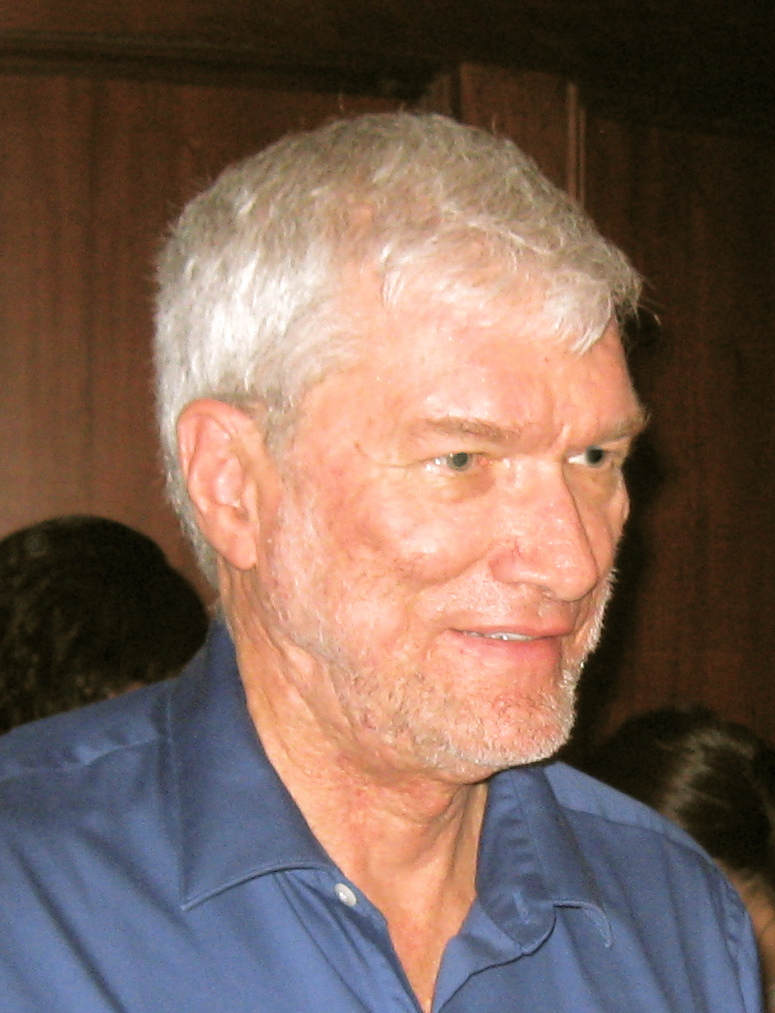
Ken Ham, founder and executive director of Answers in Genesis

In 1996, AiG petitioned Boone County to rezone a tract of land near the Big Bone Lick State Park from agricultural to industrial use for the construction of the Creation Museum. The county initially opposed the rezoning, citing in part potential conflicts with the fossil-rich state park. In 1999, newly elected commissioners approved the rezoning of an alternative 47 acres (19 ha) site south of Interstate 275 to public facilities use, and allowed construction to go forward there.

In May 2000, AiG purchased land for an undisclosed price and expected to begin construction in March 2001. At the time, AiG planned a 30,000-square-foot (2,800 m^{2}) museum, which they believed would cost US$14 million and would open by mid-2002. After market research projected more visitors to the museum than AiG had initially anticipated, plans for the museum were altered, expanding it to 50,000 square feet (4,600 m^{2}) and pushing the cost estimates to approximately US$25 million and later to US$27 million when more favorable visitor projections led them to add another 10,000 square feet (930 m^{2}) to the museum. AiG staff moved into the Creation Museum's office space in late 2004. All funds for the museum were privately raised, and the organization received donated architectural and construction services.

=== Opening ===
The Creation Museum opened on Memorial Day, May 28, 2007. Approximately 4,000 patrons and 200 protesters visited the museum on opening day, and the event was covered by international media outlets. The Orlando Sentinel wrote that the majority of the media coverage had a "mocking" undertone, similar to that found in reporting on the 2001 opening of Orlando's Holy Land Experience theme park.

Across the street from the museum, scientists, educators, students, and atheists protested at a "Rally for Reason" organized by Edwin Kagin, the Kentucky state director of American Atheists. Kagin told the Kentucky Post that the purpose of the rally was to send a message that there are "plenty of people who don't agree with the so-called science of creationism." The Reverend Mendle Adams, a protest participant, said, "my brothers and sisters in the faith who embrace [the creationist] understanding call into question the whole Christian concept" and "make us a laughing stock".

The Northern Kentucky Convention and Visitors Bureau used the museum's opening as part of their overall strategy to attract religious group conventions, which accounted for significant amounts of visitor spending in the area.

In October 2007, the Kentucky Department of Transportation erected four signs along highways near the museum bearing Kentucky's "Unbridled Spirit" logo and directing motorists to the museum's location, prompting concern from some residents about the separation of church and state. The Cincinnati Post reported that AiG paid $5,000 each for the signs, which are available to any "cultural, historical, recreational, agricultural, educational or entertainment center". The Post quoted Barry W. Lynn, executive director of Americans United for Separation of Church and State, as saying it was a "close call" as to whether the signs violated the separation of church and state.

=== Expansion ===
In April 2016, the Boone County Fiscal Court approved a development plan that will add a three-level, 210,000-square-foot (20,000 m^{2}) museum building, among other expansions that will total between $15 million to $20 million.

In November 2019, the Creation Museum opened a $3 million expansion which includes a 4D theater and a large area with several exhibits.

In October 2021, the Creation Museum announced plans to refurbish the Legacy Hall auditorium and create the Eden Teaching Center, an addition to the museum's animal space and petting zoo which will include a new animal facility, conservatory and greenhouses, classroom, and interactive dig site.

=== Attendance ===
AiG had projected that the museum would have 250,000 visitors in its first year of operation, but officials said that number was achieved in just over five months. In its first year of operation, 404,000 people visited the Creation Museum. In 2012, Cincinnati CityBeat reported that, from July 1, 2011, to June 30, 2012, Museum attendance had dropped to 254,074, a 10 percent drop from the previous year and the fourth straight year of declining attendance. AiG officials cited the poor economy and high gas prices as reasons for the decline. By mid-2015, 2.4 million people (about 300,000 visitors average over 8 years) had visited the museum.

In 2016 Slate.com reported that public schools were taking students on field trips to the museum, citing planned or completed trips to the museum by schools in Kentucky, Ohio, and Pennsylvania. The Freedom From Religion Foundation (FFRF) wrote letters to the schools in question, demanding that the trips be cancelled, or in cases where they had already occurred, not be repeated. In July 2016, in response to FFRF's letters to schools, Ham posted on his blog that student groups would be admitted at $1 per child and no charge for accompanying teachers."

In 2017, AiG reported that in the year since its other attraction, the Ark Encounter, opened, the Creation Museum saw over 800,000 visitors, nearly triple the annual average of 300,000 visitors. In April 2021, the Creation Museum and Ark Encounter welcomed their 10 millionth visitor altogether.

== Collection ==
The Creation Museum proper encompasses 75,000 square feet (7,000 m^{2}). In the museum's planetarium, visitors view a presentation written by AiG's staff astrophysicist that presents creationist cosmologies as alternatives to the Big Bang theory of the origins of the Universe. The planetarium underwent a $1.2 million renovation in 2020 while the museum was closed due to the COVID-19 pandemic; the renovations expanded the planetarium's capacity, upgraded its display equipment, and improved its acoustics. In the 200-seat theater—which features special effects such as seats that vibrate and jets that spray the audience with mist—a film depicts two angelic beings who proclaim, "God loves science!" The museum also includes a restaurant and a medieval-themed gift shop. Outside the main structure are walking trails and a 5-acre (0.020 km^{2}) lake.

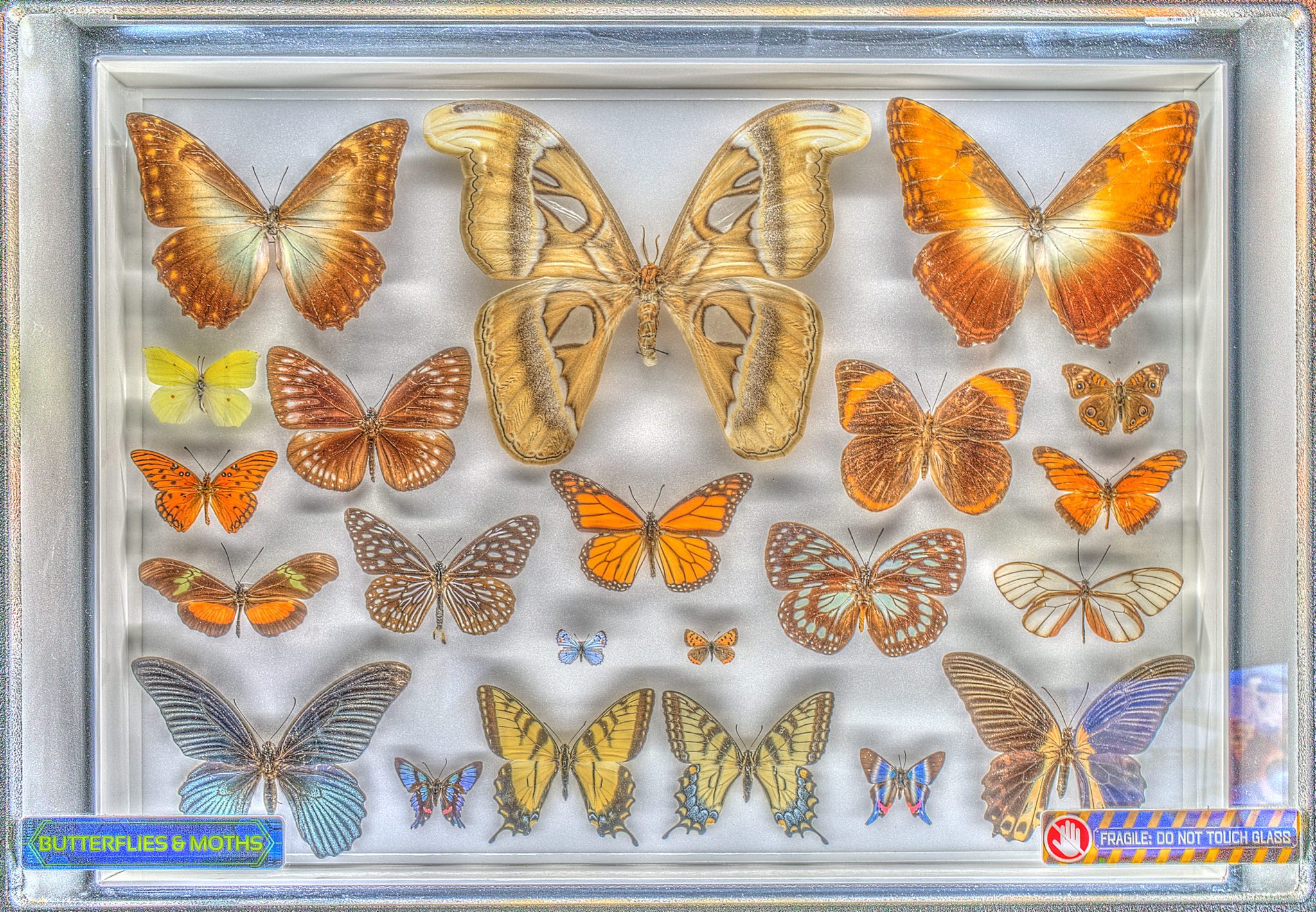
A collection of butterflies and moths is an example of real specimens on display, as opposed to the animatronic "Dr. Crawley" character that accompanies the butterfly display.

Patrick Marsh, who designed the Jaws and King Kong attractions at Universal Studios Florida, led the design of the exhibits for the Creation Museum. Kurt Wise was hired as scientific consultant and also played a major role in designing the exhibits, including the 52 professionally made videos. In 2009, AiG added an exhibit about natural selection, featuring models of finches, which Charles Darwin observed before proposing the theory of evolution in 1859. A 2013 expansion project added a lobby display suggesting that ancient stories of monsters and dragons may have been accounts of human encounters with dinosaurs. An animatronic character depicting a science professor in a research lab, dubbed "Dr. Crawley", tells visitors that, due to the variation and complexity of bug species, they could not have evolved naturally but must have been created by God.

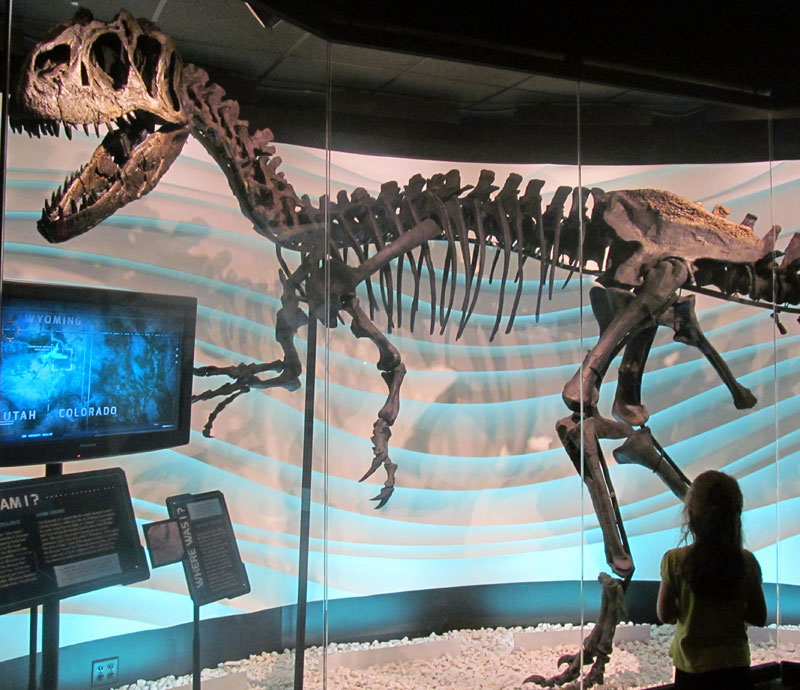
"Ebenezer", the Allosaurus skeleton represents AiG's mission to "take the dinosaurs back [from the evolutionists]".

Dinosaurs are prominently featured in many areas of the museum. Prior to the museum's opening, Ham stated, "We're putting evolutionists on notice: We're taking the dinosaurs back... They're used to teach people that there's no God, and they're used to brainwash people. Evolutionists get very upset when we use dinosaurs." While some of the museum's dinosaur models are animatronic, many were sculpted from fiberglass by a taxidermist. Near the museum's lobby, a diorama depicts two ancient-age children playing near a stream, unmolested by nearby dinosaurs.

Since 2014, the museum has displayed the skeleton of a 30 feet (9.1 m) long, 10 feet (3.0 m) wide Allosaurus fragilis dubbed "Ebenezer". Over half of the skeleton, including a nearly-complete 3 feet (0.91 m) long skull with 53 teeth, was recovered from the northern Colorado portion of Morrison Formation. The Elizabeth Streb Peroutka Foundation of Pasadena, Maryland, purchased the skeleton and donated it to the museum, and AiG paid an anonymous expert based in Utah to restore it before displaying it. The skeleton is presented as evidence of Noah's Flood. In 2021, Brian William Delafayette was indicted for making a bomb threat after posting on an AiG-affiliated web page that a bomb had been planted under the Allosaurus display at the museum; no bomb was found at the site.

The museum is also critical of evolutionary theory that links dinosaurs with bird evolution. The second room of the Creation Museum, for example, displays a model prehistoric Utahraptor, stating that the species was featherless and had no connection to birds, referring to Genesis 1, which states that birds were created before the advent of land animals.

== Visitor experience ==
Visitors to the museum follow a sequential series of rooms. Casey Kelly and Kristen Hoerl explain that "the museum constructs an argument chain in which claims from previous rooms provide support for subsequent claims". The first room in the sequence contains a diorama of two paleontologists uncovering the skeletal remains of an indistinct creature. Two actors meant to represent the paleontologists are displayed on television screens mounted nearby; one explains that he believes that the creature died in a local flood millions of years earlier, while the other surmises that the creature died in the biblical Great Flood about 4,300 years earlier. This room is immediately followed by a second room of placards explaining various natural phenomena using two distinct "starting points"—mainstream science and the biblical narrative. From here, visitors enter an L-shaped corridor that begins with mannequins representing the Old Testament prophets Moses, David, and Isaiah, while audio recordings of passages from the Book of Psalms are played nearby. Further down the corridor, placards detail historical arguments against a literal interpretation of the Bible and conclude that "The elevation of human reason above God's word is the essence of every attack on God's word." The walls near the corridor's exit contain existentialist questions such as "Am I alone?", and "Why do I suffer?", paired with illustrations of human conflict and suffering.

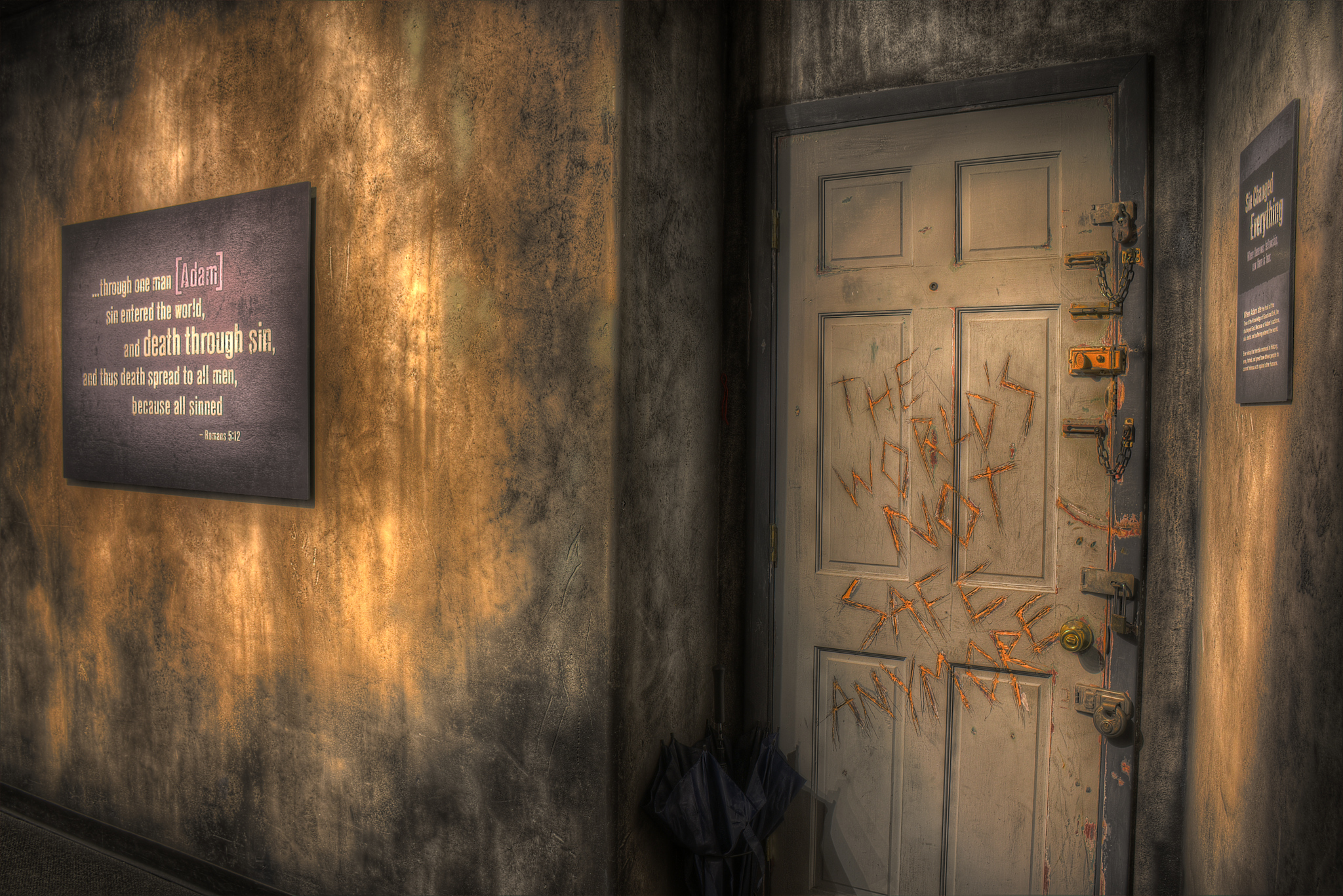
A display representing urban decay

After leaving the corridor, visitors enter a room designed to resemble a decaying urban alley full of graffiti and littered with newspaper clippings about the legalization of abortion, same-sex marriage, and euthanasia. An accompanying placard concludes: "Scripture abandoned in the culture leads to... relative morality, hopelessness and meaninglessness." In the final room in this series, video screens depict the purported results of abandoning a literal interpretation of the Bible. In one, a teenage girl is on the phone with an abortion clinic. In another, a teenage boy rolls a joint while staring at a computer screen; a narrator informs the viewer that the boy is looking at pornography. In the center of the room, a wrecking ball labeled "Millions of Years" damages the foundation of a church building. Nearby stands a Ken Ham mannequin pushing a wheelbarrow full of bricks, symbolizing the reparative work of AiG.

The second series of rooms depict a literal interpretation of the Book of Genesis, arranged around the concept of "The Seven C's in God's Eternal Plan": creation, corruption, catastrophe, confusion, Christ, cross, and consummation. At the entrance to this area, a flat panel television displays a computer-generated imagery (CGI) animation of millions of particles converging to create an adult human male, the biblical Adam. Subsequent creation dioramas show Adam naming animals in the Garden of Eden and Eve being created from Adam's rib. Accompanying placards maintain that the special creation of Adam and Eve conveys God's desire for families to consist only of opposite-sex couples and their offspring.

The exhibit on corruption shows Adam and Eve eating the fruit of the tree of the knowledge of good and evil, resulting in the fall of man. Further exhibits depict the aftermath of this event: animals being killed to make garments for Adam and Eve, Cain killing Abel, and Methuselah warning of God's coming judgment. Black-and-white photographs also show examples of modern suffering, such as the Holocaust and the explosion of an atomic bomb. According to accompanying placards, after the fall, some animals became meat-eaters, and competition for resources drove some creatures to extinction. An April 2006 report in the Chicago Tribune noted that this area also features noxious odors and increased temperatures, and AiG general manager Mike Zovath told the paper that the intent was to make it "the most uncomfortable place in the museum to show how original sin has corrupted the universe".

The "catastrophe", an allusion to the Great Flood recounted in Genesis chapters 6 through 9, is represented by animatronic figures constructing Noah's Ark and an interactive exhibit that allows visitors to select frequently asked questions about Noah's Ark and have them answered audibly by an animatronic Noah. Kelly and Hoerl describe the interactive Noah as "remarkable", noting: "Noah is imbued with human affect and individuality, including complex physical features and detailed bodily movements; his speech patterns, facial expressions, and bodily gestures are in near-perfect sync with his eye, mouth, and head movements; and his hair, skin tone, and musculature closely imitates real human features." The catastrophe displays are further enhanced by CGI animations of the Great Flood covering the Earth as observed from both outer space and a period-specific settlement.

The post-flood world is presented in the next room as a time when man began to rely solely on human reasoning, resulting in "confusion". Displays argue that dependence on human reasoning leads to racism and genocide, with one sign bearing a quote from Stephen Jay Gould noting that racism increased exponentially following the acceptance of the theory of evolution. A diorama claims that the Tower of Babel explains the dispersal of people after the flood and the rapid divergence of languages during that period.

The final three C's—Christ, cross, and consummation—are presented in a single room where visitors wait before entering a theater to view The Last Adam, a film where actors representing Mary, the mother of Jesus, and an unnamed Roman soldier describe their experiences during the crucifixion of Jesus. After the Seven C's area, a video introduces the next section of the museum by stating that "Scientists are developing a series of models to explain how the Flood and its aftermath could have shaped the world today." Large fossils displayed in glass cases are purported to have been formed as a result of the Great Flood. Large placards illustrate geological models developed by creation scientists at AiG, the Discovery Institute, and the Institute for Creation Research.

The tour continues in the "Dinosaur Den", which contains models of dinosaurs with attached signage explaining their lives from the YEC viewpoint. The Dragon Theater, the last exhibit space on tour, posits the relatively recent extinction of dinosaurs and speculates that Medieval dragon legends may have been inspired by actual encounters with dinosaurs. Visitors exit the tour through the museum's gift shop, which contains both souvenirs and AiG print and multimedia publications.

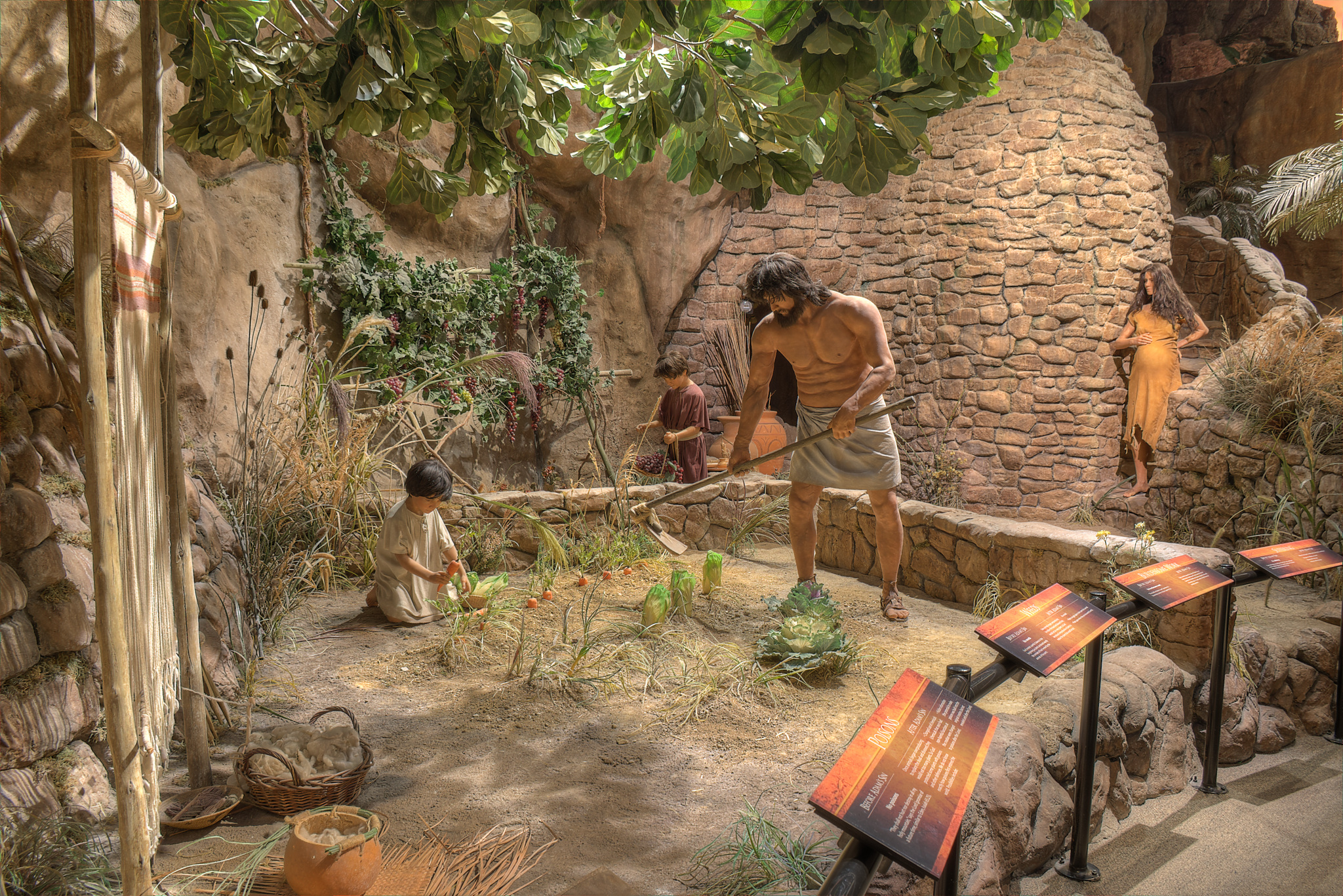
"Working the Ground"

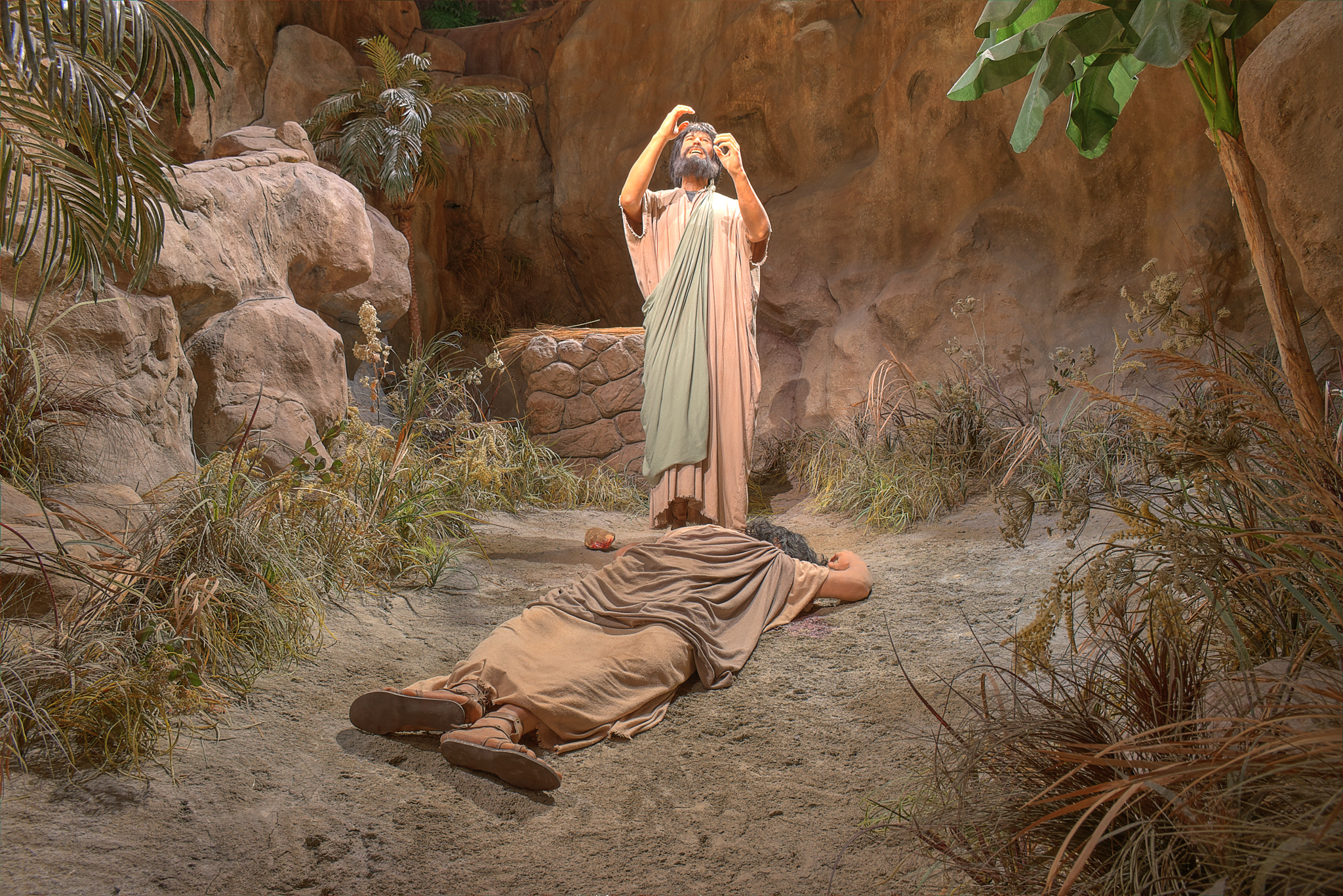
Cain and Abel

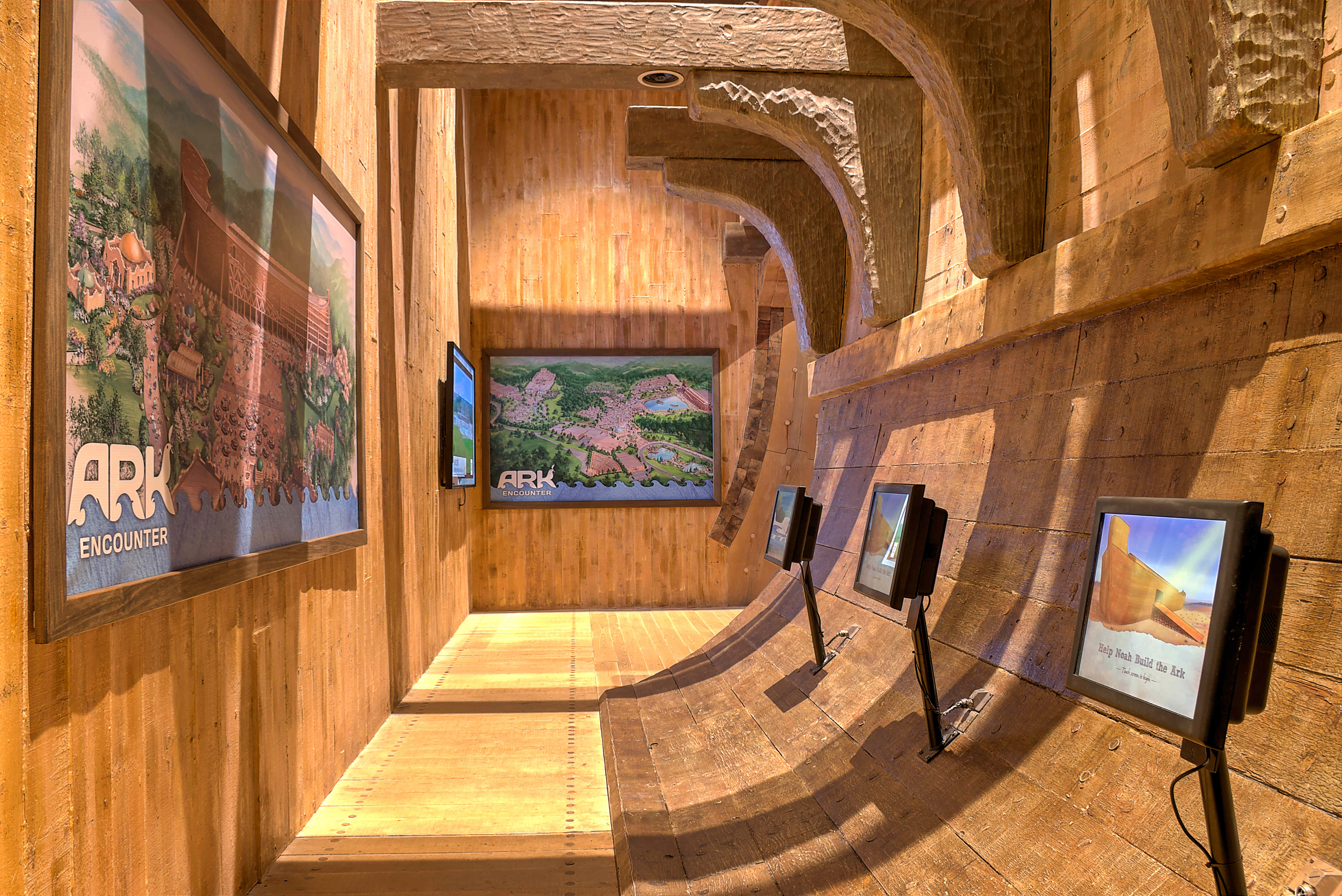
Interior of Noah's ark

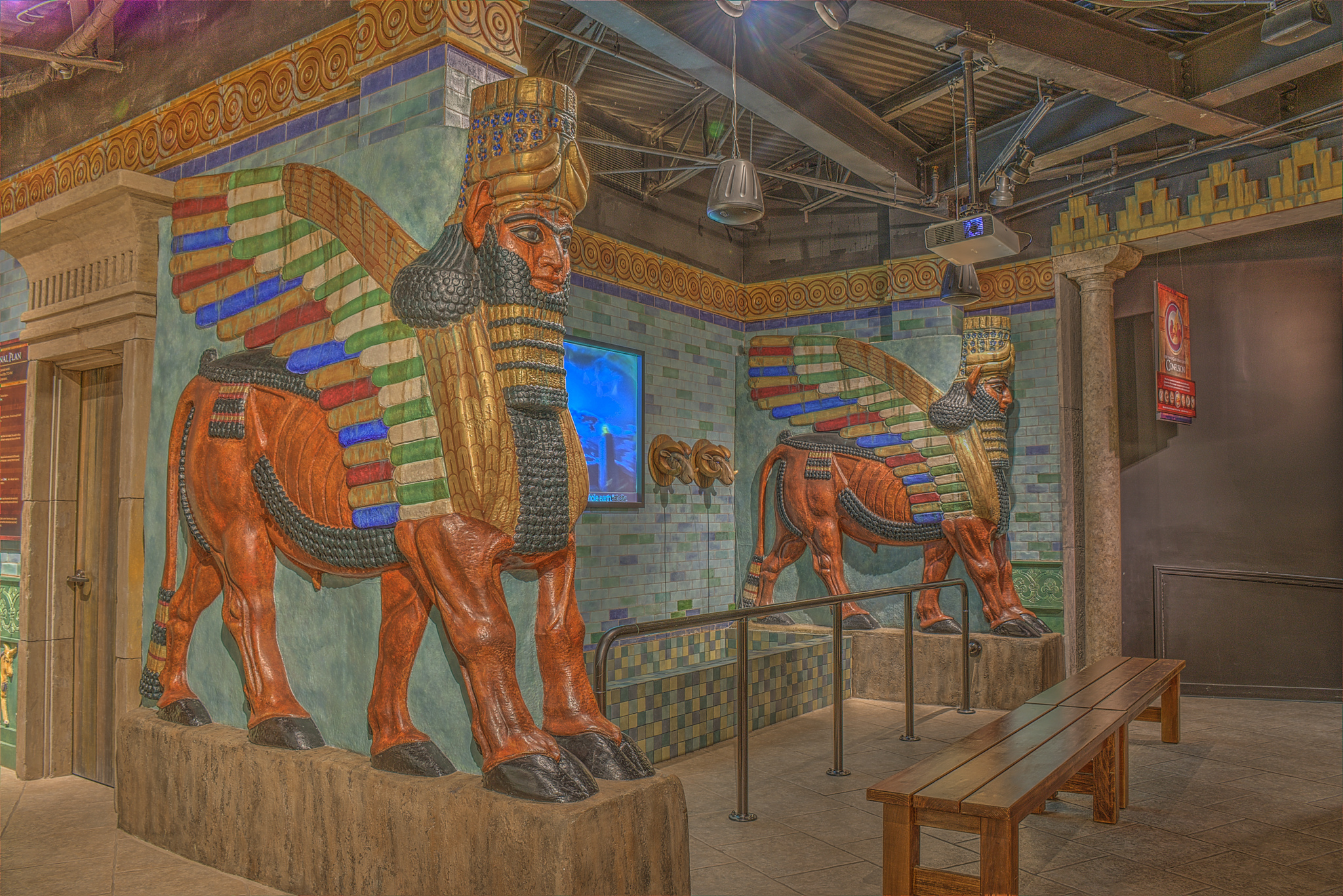
Tower of Babel

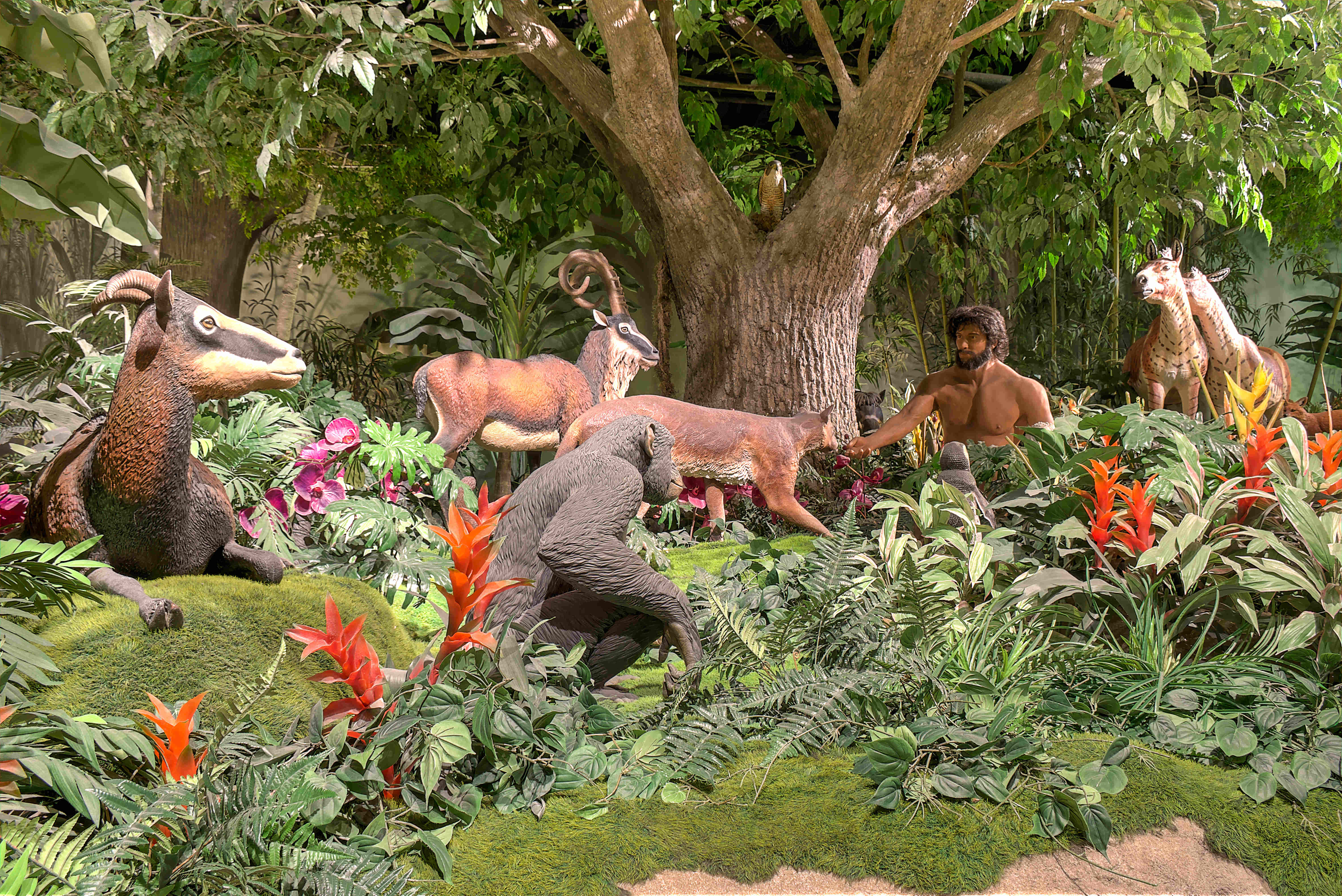
Adam naming the animals

Representations of biblical scenes in the museum

== Programs and events ==
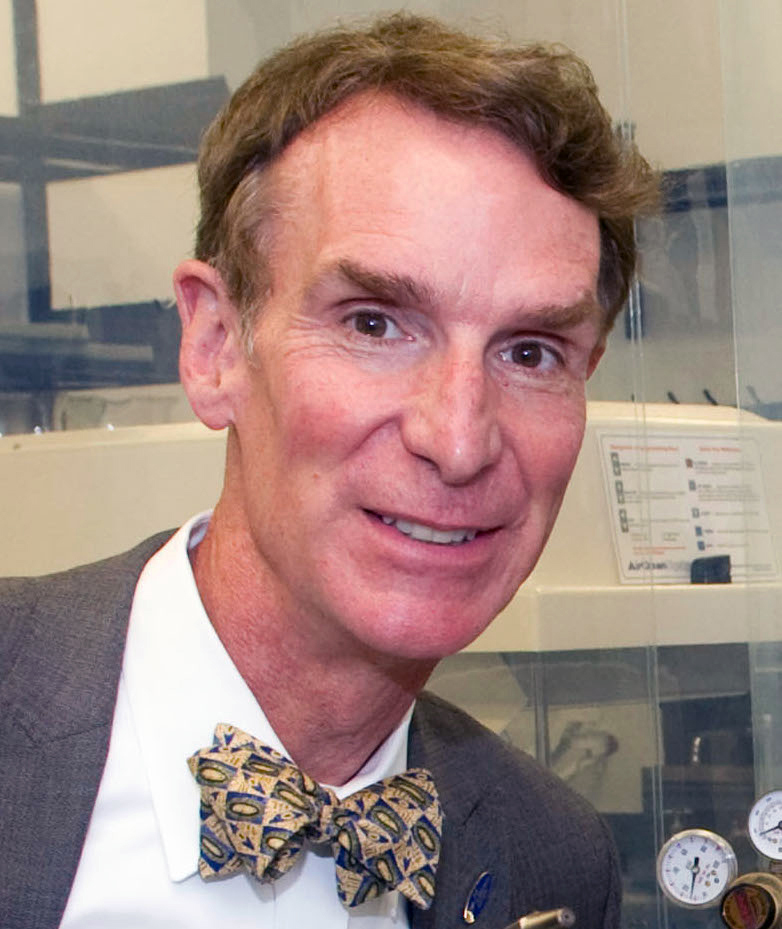
Bill Nye debated with Ken Ham on February 4, 2014.

In addition to exhibits, the museum hosts a variety of special programs and events. Many focus on creationist concepts or more broadly on Christian themes and teachings. Some of the museum's events have met with controversy. In December 2008, the Cincinnati Zoo discontinued a cross-promotion it had planned with the Creation Museum after offering the deal for less than three days, citing "numerous complaints".

In February 2011, the museum denied a same-sex couple entry to its after-hours "Date Night". It refused to reimburse the cost of their tickets (about US$70), stating it was clear from the advertisements that the event was about Christian marriage, which is between a man and a woman, and that one of the men had made a statement in a blog post a month earlier that gave the museum the impression that the couple was planning to be disruptive. The blog requested donations to send a "flamboyantly gay" couple to the event. Later one of the men admitted he wasn't gay and said that he was curious to see if the museum would let them in.

=== Bill Nye debate ===
The Bill Nye–Ken Ham debate was one of the most publicized events at the museum. It took place in February 2014, and featured a debate between Ken Ham and Bill Nye, a science educator known for the television series Bill Nye the Science Guy. Ham challenged Nye to come to the museum to debate YEC and whether creationism is a viable model of origins. CNN's Tom Foreman moderated the debate. The museum's 900-seat Legacy Hall was sold out within minutes of tickets going on sale. It was estimated that nearly 3 million people viewed the debate online and C-SPAN rebroadcast the debate on February 19. Publicity generated by the debate spurred fundraising for AiG, allowing construction to begin on the Ark Encounter, an AiG theme park intended to center on a full-scale interpretation of Noah's Ark.

== Reactions ==
=== Reviews ===
The museum is controversial and has received much criticism from the scientific and religious communities, as well as cultural commentators. In her 2013 book, Sensational Devotion: Evangelical Performance in Twenty-First Century America, Jill Stevenson, an associate professor of theatre arts at Marymount Manhattan College, wrote that "The Creation Museum prompts more questions from friends and colleagues than any of the other venues I examine in this book. It is not simply the museum's anti-evolution message that fascinates people. Even more compelling is how the Creation Museum actually conveys that message. By coupling the physical form of a traditional natural history museum with a radical community-based agenda, the Creation Museum empowers and gives public voice to a community that perceives itself as threatened, disenfranchised, and misrepresented by mainstream culture."

In the introduction to their 2016 book Righting America at the Creation Museum, Susan and William Trollinger noted: "the Creation Museum lies squarely within the right side of the American cultural, political, and religious mainstream... it represents and speaks to the religious and political commitments of a large swath of the American population." Jonathan Gitlin, reviewing the museum for Ars Technica in 2007, said the museum's displays were "on a par with the better modern museums I've been to". He added that the museum was "designed for a fundamentalist Christian crowd" and was "no friend to those who do not hold to its creationist tenets", also containing "what can only be described as a house of horrors about the dangers of abortion and drugs and the devil's music". Trollinger and Trollinger called the museum "an impressive and sophisticated visual argument on behalf of young Earth creationism and a highly politicized fundamentalism". Hemant Mehta has said that the "layout at the Creation Museum really is beautiful. However, the quality of information is worthless, which makes the 'museum' nothing more than an expensive way to confuse and indoctrinate children."

A. A. Gill, a British writer and critic, described the museum as "battling science and reason since 2007", writing: "This place doesn't just take on evolution – it squares off with geology, anthropology, paleontology, history, chemistry, astronomy, zoology, biology, and good taste. It directly and boldly contradicts most -onomies and all -ologies, including most theology." Lisa Park, a professor of paleontology at University of Akron said, "I think it's very bad science and even worse theology... and the theology is far more offensive to me. I think there's a lot of focus on fear, and I don't think that's a very Christian message... I find it a malicious manipulation of the public."

The Creation Museum's promotion of YEC has garnered criticism from individuals who adhere to old Earth creationism or theistic evolution. In a press kit released in connection with the Creation Museum's opening, geologist Greg Neyman, founder of Old Earth Ministries, wrote that "The non-Christians (...) will see the museum, and recognize its faulty science, and will be turned away from the church." Catholic theologian John Haught, a theistic evolutionist, said, "It's theologically problematic to me, as well as scientifically problematic" and that the museum would cause an "impoverishment" of religion. Theistic evolutionist Michael Patrick Leahy, editor of the online magazine Christian Faith and Reason, said that the museum "undermines the credibility of all Christians".

In his review of the museum for The New York Times, columnist Edward Rothstein wrote, "It is a measure of the museum's daring that dinosaurs and fossils—once considered major challenges to belief in the Bible's creation story—are here so central, appearing not as tests of faith, as one religious authority once surmised, but as creatures no different from the giraffes and cats that still walk the earth." Authors Casey Kelly and Kristen Hoerl wrote that "By adopting the formal structure of the nature and science museum, including the display of dinosaur fossils, the Creation Museum provides a site where young-Earth creationists can take their children to "see the dinosaurs" without compromising their beliefs."

=== Criticism ===
Before the museum's opening, about 2,000 educators signed a statement written by the Campaign to Defend the Constitution (DefCon) calling the museum part of a "campaign by the religious right to inject creationist teachings into science education". The National Center for Science Education collected over 800 signatures from scientists in the three states closest to the museum (Kentucky, Indiana, and Ohio) on a statement calling the museum's exhibits "scientifically inaccurate materials" and expressing concerns that students who accept its premises as scientifically valid would be "unlikely to succeed in science courses at the college level". Lawrence Krauss, who signed the DefCon statement; Eugenie Scott, executive director of NCSE; and Alan Leshner, chief executive officer of the American Association for the Advancement of Science, each told the Associated Press (AP) that AiG was within its rights to open the museum, but expressed concerns about its effects on science education. Leshner said, "We're not talking about free speech. We would not protest the museum. However, we are concerned that we not mislead young people inadvertently or intentionally about what science is showing." Krauss has called on media, educators, and government officials to shun the museum and says that its view is based on falsehoods.

Dinosaurs were featured prominently in AiG's 2012 billboard advertising campaign, which targeted metropolitan areas in 25 states. Commenting on the ad campaign, Steven Newton of the National Center for Science Education said, "I think it's a real shame that there aren't science museums that are competing in the same way, with the same sort of advertising with the same sort of budgets." After viewing a display claiming that the Grand Canyon could have been carved in a matter of hours by receding floodwaters, just as volcanic mudslides carved canyons in softer rock in the aftermath of the 1980 eruption of Mount St. Helens, chemist William Watkin declared, "Everything they said about sediment deposition, about Mount St. Helens... anyone in first year geology would say 'wrong from top to bottom'".

In August 2007, Daniel Phelps, president of the Kentucky Paleontological Society, criticized the Northern Kentucky Convention and Visitors Bureau for describing the museum on its web site as a "'walk through history' museum that will counter evolutionary natural history museums that turn countless minds against Christ and Scripture". The bureau initially defended its use of the language, saying that they used whatever language was supplied by each attraction featured on the site. Still, Phelps complained that, as a tax-supported institution, the bureau should not use language that claimed other museums turn people against religion. Within a week of the complaint, the bureau had updated the museum's description on the web site to read, "A walk through history via the pages of the Bible—exploring how scripture provides an eyewitness account of the beginning of all things." Commenting on the museum's efforts to attract classes of public school students, Zack Kopplin wrote: "At Ham's Vision conferences, he's free to teach children that T. Rex was a vegetarian that lived with Adam and Eve. No matter how ludicrous it is, that's a legitimate exercise of religious freedom. These creationist field trips, however, are not. No matter how steep the discount, public schools can't afford to miseducate our kids with religious pseudoscience like creationism."

=== Status as a museum ===
Writing in the journal Argumentation and Advocacy, authors Casey Kelly and Kristen Hoerl point out that "physical remnants are not available as evidence for events described in the Book of Genesis ... Consequently, the Creation Museum demonstrates the materiality of creationist thinking through its display of objects that are, by and large, created for the museum or manufactured recently." Because many of the articles on display at the Creation Museum are manufactured, The Guardian called it "quite possibly ... one of the weirdest museums in the world". Krauss stated that "[On a scale of 1 to 5, with 5 being best], I'd give [the museum] a 4 for technology", but added he'd also give it "5 for propaganda" and "As for content, I'd give it a negative 5."

Gretchen Jennings, editor of Exhibitionist, wrote that creationist museums like the Creation Museum are not museums at all, and said that if they applied for accreditation as museums, their applications should be denied. As of 2014, no creationist museums have been accredited by the American Alliance of Museums (AAM). National Center for Science Education (NCSE) director Eugenie Scott characterized the Creation Museum as "the Creationist Disneyland". Writing for the NCSE, Daniel Phelps called the Creation Museum "the Anti-Museum", while PZ Myers called it "Ken Ham's fabulous fake museum" in a 2007 post on his Pharyngula blog; other mainstream scientists derisively dubbed it the "Fred and Wilma Flintstone Museum". In a 2013 blog post, Ken Ham responded to such criticisms by writing that the Creation Museum is a true museum, as defined by the Merriam-Webster dictionary and the AAM's website.

== Workforce ==
The museum operates as a division of Answers in Genesis. In 2007 about 160 people including a chaplain worked at the museum, and another 140 people worked at the attached Answers in Genesis headquarters. Each permanent employee of AiG, including people who work at the museum, must sign a statement of faith indicating that they believe in young-Earth creationism and the other teachings of Answers in Genesis, "in order to preserve the function and integrity of the ministry". The statement of faith includes "Scripture teaches a recent origin for man and the whole creation", "the only legitimate marriage is the joining of one man and one woman", "the great Flood of Genesis was an actual historic event", and "no apparent, perceived or claimed evidence in any field, including history and chronology, can be valid if it contradicts the Scriptural record". When applying for work, a written statement of one's beliefs is required along with a résumé and references. In 2007, The Kentucky Post reported that the Creation Museum employed between 10 and 20 security guards, armed with .40 caliber Glock handguns and three certified law enforcement canines.

In 2015, the Creation Museum and AiG were recognized on The Cincinnati Enquirer's list of top 100 workplaces in the Cincinnati/Northern Kentucky region. The determination was made based on a confidential survey of employees conducted by Workplace Dynamics, an independent research firm.

== In the media ==
A three-part documentary titled The Story of God, hosted by Robert Winston, aired on BBC One in December 2005. The third part of the documentary featured footage of the museum during its construction, as well as brief interviews with Ken Ham and Patrick Marsh. After these interviews, Winston states, "It was alarming to see so much time, money and effort being spent on making a mockery of hard won scientific knowledge. And the fact that it was being done with such obvious sincerity, somehow made it all the worse." The documentary also featured excerpts from an hour-long debate between Winston and Ham over the relative merits of creationism and evolution that was aired on radio station 700 WLW in Cincinnati.

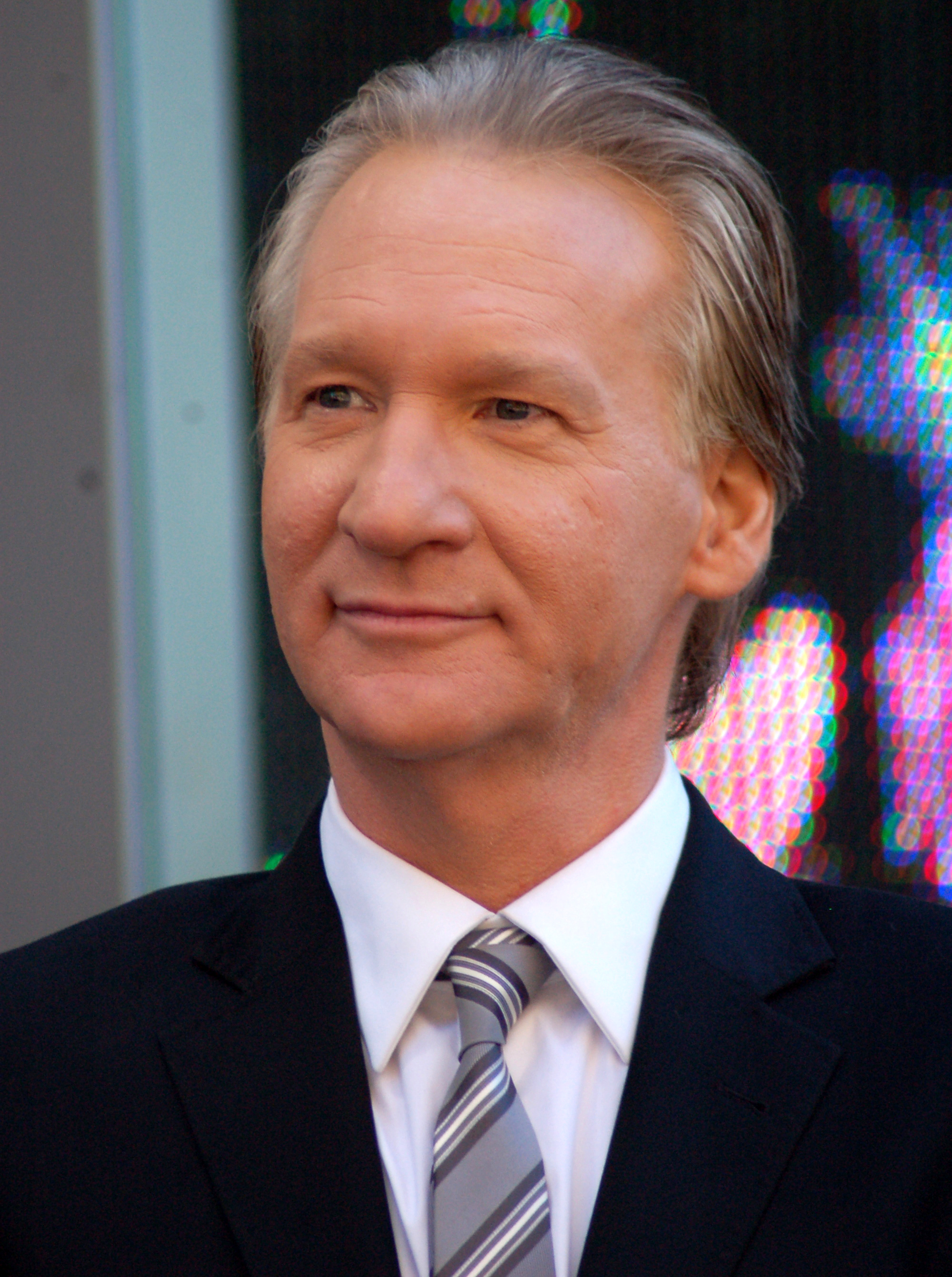
Bill Maher visited the Creation Museum as part of his 2008 documentary Religulous.

In February 2007, a crew filming footage for comedian Bill Maher's anti-religious documentary Religulous toured the museum and arranged for Maher to interview Ken Ham without Ham knowing in advance that Maher would be the interviewer. In an August 2008 interview with Los Angeles Times columnist Patrick Goldstein, Maher said he used similar tactics to secure interviews with other people shown in the film: "It was simple: We never, ever, used my name. (...) We even had a fake title for the film. We called it 'A Spiritual Journey'." Maher continued: "The hour is getting very late to be able to indulge in having key decisions made by religious people. By irrationalists, by those who would steer the ship of state not by a compass, but by the equivalent of reading the entrails of a chicken."

In July 2007, the radio show This Week in Science, broadcast by the University of California, Davis, published a website promoting a fictional "Unicorn Museum", a parody of the Creation Museum. According to the Unicorn Museum web site, "... many Christian adherents still maintain that the Bible is a wholly accurate historical account. By focusing on the more implausible aspects of this reputed infallible document, the Unicorn Museum seeks to illustrate the $27 Million charade that is the Creation Museum and highlight the intellectual laxity that characterizes Creationism and Intelligent Design."

A 2008 episode in the first season of the TLC reality series 17 Kids and Counting (now known as 19 Kids and Counting) features the Duggar family's trip to the museum, including a personal tour they were given by Ken Ham. Jim Bob Duggar, the family patriarch, said, "We wanted to bring our family here to teach our children about creation and to show them all these great exhibits of how the world was created, and also to reinforce to them the fallacies of evolution and how it was impossible for this world just to all happen by chance." The Washington Times reported that the episode's airing "sparked reaction on both sides of the cultural debate" on Internet message boards.

On the 150th anniversary of the publication of Charles Darwin's On the Origin of Species, in February 2010 Vanity Fair magazine published British critic A. A. Gill's negative review of the museum under the title Roll Over, Charles Darwin!, with photographs by actor Paul Bettany (who had portrayed Darwin in the film Creation). Jill Stevenson noted that although most press coverage of the museum occurred around its 2007 opening, continuing coverage in Vanity Fair and elsewhere "tesif[ied] to people's ongoing curiosity about the venue."

The Creation Museum ranked second in the Best Religious Museum category of the 2020 USA Today/10Best.com Readers Choice Awards; the top spot went to its sister attraction, the Ark Encounter.

== See also ==
- Creation Evidence Museum
- ICR Discovery Center for Science & Earth History
- List of creation myths
- Religious cosmology
