= Monty White =

British young Earth creationist

A.J. Monty White (2nd of December 1944 - 19th of April 2026) was a British young Earth creationist and was formerly the Chief Executive of the UK branch of Answers in Genesis. White is a graduate of the University of Wales; he obtained a BSc in Chemistry in 1967 and in 1970 earned his PhD for research in the kinetic theory of gas from Aberystwyth University.

== Biography ==
White was brought up by his parents as an atheist, he later became a theistic evolutionist after studying geology. He later changed his position after studying the Bible, saying evolution is not compatible with Christianity, and became a young Earth creationist.

White states that "evolution is not compatible with Christianity," and believes the earth is about 6,000 years old and that "people believe in evolution because they choose to do so." Furthermore, he says "there is not a shred of real evidence for the evolution of life on earth."

In his autobiographical paper "My spiritual pilgrimage from theistic evolution to Creation," White says:

Each discipline should be dismantled, and, starting at the foundation, purged of unbiblical notions and rebuilt in accordance with biblical values and givens ... If ultimately we will be fools in the eyes of the world anyway, why not at least be consistent fools, and uphold God's Word in its undiminished entirety?

In his 1985 book How Old is the Earth?, White said that any evidence which shows that the Earth is older than the Bible is superficial and misleading. White says the theory of evolution is linked to immorality. In an interview with the BBC he said, "If you tell people they're animals, they'll behave like animals".

== Radiometric dating ==
White accepts the general validity of carbon-14 dating for the last five thousand years but not beyond.

== Works ==
- What About Origins, Dunestone Printers Limited (1978) ISBN 0-906511-00-3
- The Scientific Case for Creation, Heath Christian Trust (1984) ISBN 0-907193-05-6
- How Old is the Earth?, (1985) ISBN 0-87552-982-8
- Wonderfully Made, Evangelical Press (1989) ISBN 0-85234-262-4
- Why I Believe in Creation, Evangelical Press (1994) ISBN 0-85234-319-1

== See also ==
- Flood geology
- Duane Gish
