= ICR Discovery Center for Science & Earth History =

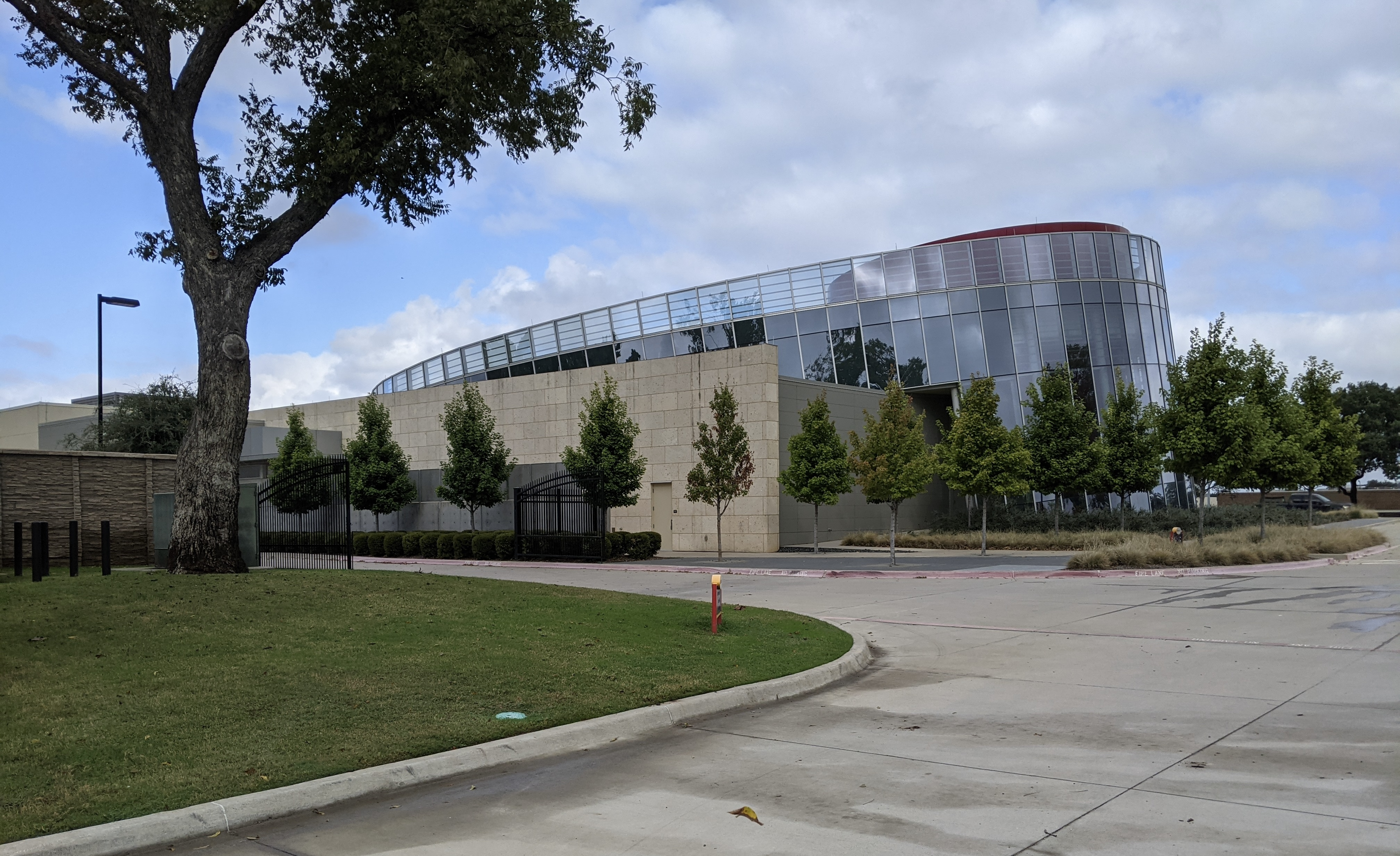
- Established: September 2, 2019
- Location: Dallas, Texas, US
- Coordinates: 32.895157°N 96.917408°W
- Type: Creationist museum
- Owner: Institute for Creation Research
- Website: discoverycenter.icr.org

The ICR Discovery Center for Science & Earth History is a creationist museum in Dallas, Texas. Owned and operated by the Institute for Creation Research, the museum opened on September 2, 2019, with 1,600 people visiting on its first day.

The museum cost $37.8 million. The museum promotes young Earth creationist beliefs, including pseudoscientific arguments linking the Grand Canyon and the Earth's geology to the Genesis flood narrative.

== See also ==
- Creation Museum
- Flood geology
