= Kevin Henke =

American geochemist

Kevin R. Henke
- Born: April 17, 1957 (age 69); Friend, Nebraska
- Education: Doane College, University of North Dakota
- Known for: Criticism of young Earth creationism
- Spouse: Yvonne
- Children: Two
- Scientific career
- Fields: Geochemistry
- Workplaces: University of Kentucky
- Thesis: Chemistry and environmental implications of thio-red® and 2,4,6-trimercaptotriazine compounds (1997)

Kevin R. Henke is an American geochemist and former instructor at the University of Kentucky's department of Geology. He currently works as a senior research scientist at the University of Kentucky's Center for Applied Energy Research. He is well known for his criticism of young Earth creationism and the scientific arguments they make for a young Earth. In particular, he has been critical of the RATE project's results, which claim to show that zircons contain too much helium to be billions of years old, and has argued that Russell Humphreys, a young Earth creationist who was involved in the project, has made errors in his research. These flaws include that, according to Henke, "The vast majority of Humphreys et al.'s critical a, b, and Q/Q0 values that are used in these "dating" equations are either missing, poorly defined, improperly measured or inaccurate." Henke has also accused Humphreys of misidentifying his specimens, fudging his data, and not considering the possibility of helium contamination in his research. He has also criticized John Woodmorappe for arguing that radiometric dating is unreliable. On one occasion, Henke called Kent Hovind on the phone regarding Hovind's $250,000 challenge to "prove" evolution. Hovind told Henke that in order to win the money he would have to recreate the Big Bang in a laboratory. Henke responded by proposing several alternative "proofs" that pertained to geology (his field of expertise), but Hovind refused, saying that the project must be chosen by him and it must not pertain to the area in which Henke has scientific expertise. Hovind therefore required Henke to prove that dogs and bananas had a common ancestor, and lowered the award to only $2,000 should he succeed. Henke accepted the challenge, and later drafted a contract, which was then posted on Talk.origins. However, one of Henke's requirements was that the judges be unbiased, and Hovind rejected the challenge for this reason, insisting that he should be the only one who can choose the judges.
