= Kurt Wise =

American paleontologist, geologist, and creationist (born 1959)

- Born: Kurt Patrick Wise; August 1, 1959 (age 67); Illinois, U.S.
- Education: University of Chicago (BA); Harvard University (MA, PhD)
- Scientific career
- Fields: Geology; Paleontology
- Workplaces: Truett McConnell University; Southern Baptist Theological Seminary; Bryan College
- Thesis: The Estimation of True Taxonomic Durations from Fossil Occurrence Data (1989)
- Doctoral advisor: Stephen Jay Gould
- Other academic advisors: David M. Raup

Kurt Patrick Wise (born August 1, 1959) is an American paleontologist and geologist. A young Earth creationist, he is a professor of natural science at Truett McConnell University, where he is also the director of its Creation Research Center. He writes in support of creationism and contributed to the Creation Museum in Petersburg, Kentucky.

== Biography ==
=== Early life and education ===
Wise was born in 1959 to a fundamentalist Baptist family in Illinois. He was raised in a farming community in Rochelle, Illinois. After high school, Wise graduated from the University of Chicago with a Bachelor of Arts (B.A.) in geophysics with honors in 1981. He then completed graduate studies at Harvard University, where he earned a Master of Arts (M.A.) in geology and a Ph.D. in paleontology under the supervision of Stephen Jay Gould, a prominent opponent of creationism, in 1989.

Wise's doctoral dissertation at Harvard was titled, "The estimation of true taxonomic durations from fossil occurrence data". According to science historian Ronald Numbers, "fellow graduate students sometimes taunted their creationist colleague, but the bemused Gould always treated him [Wise] with respect".

=== Career ===
Since the fall of 2009, Wise has been the director of Truett McConnell University's Creation Research Center in Cleveland, Georgia. Between August 2006 and May 2009, he taught at Southern Baptist Theological Seminary as director of the school's Center for Theology and Science, a job in which he was preceded by intelligent design advocate William Dembski. He had previously taught at Bryan College in Dayton, Tennessee, where he served as Director of the Center for Origins Research and as an Associate Professor of Science for seventeen years.

He served as consultant to the Answers in Genesis Creation Museum which opened in 2007. Timothy H. Heaton, another scientist who studied under Stephen Jay Gould, knows Wise as "a less propaganda-oriented creationist" than Ken Ham, the leader of Answers in Genesis, and said that Wise's influence on the displays was apparent.

== Views ==
In 1998, Robert Schadewald described Wise as influential on "modern creationism as it is practiced at its higher levels." Wise has said he believes, according to a literal reading of the Bible, "that the Earth is young, and the universe is young, I would suggest that it's less than ten thousand years in age." He believes that science can be used to support and demonstrate these claims. Despite believing that science supports his position, Wise has written that:

Although there are scientific reasons for accepting a young Earth, I am a young age creationist because that is my understanding of the Scripture. As I shared with my professors years ago when I was in college, if all the evidence in the universe turns against creationism, I would be the first to admit it, but I would still be a creationist because that is what the Word of God seems to indicate.

As a young child interested in science, Wise tentatively adopted an old Earth creationist point of view after doing a science fair project on the geologic column, but was not completely satisfied with that decision:

What nagged me was that even if the days were long periods of time, the order was still out of whack. After all, science said the sun came before the Earth—or at least at the same time—and the Bible said that the Earth came three days before the sun. Whereas science said that the sea creatures came before plants and the land creatures came before flying creatures, the Bible indicated that plants preceded sea creatures and flying creatures preceded land creatures. On the other hand, making the days millions of years long seemed to take away most of the conflict. I thus determined to shelve these problems in the back recesses of my mind. It didn't work. Over the next couple of years, the conflict of order nagged me.

Later, as a sophomore in high school, he took a newly purchased double-sided print Bible and a pair of scissors and cut out every other verse which could not be interpreted literally if scientific determinations on the age of the Earth and evolution were true. He pursued this task with a flashlight under the covers of his bed for several months; at the end, he had removed so much material that "with the cover of the Bible taken off, I attempted to physically lift the Bible from the bed between two fingers. Yet, try as I might, and even with the benefit of intact margins throughout the pages of Scripture, I found it impossible to pick up the Bible without it being rent in two." Wise decided to reject evolution instead of Biblical literalism, deciding:

...that the rejection of evolution does not necessarily involve the rejection of all of science. In fact, I have come to learn that science owes its very existence and rationale to the claims of Scripture. On the other hand, I have also learned that evolution is not the only claim of modern science which must be rejected if Scripture is assumed to be true.

== Reception ==
Biologist and popular atheist author Richard Dawkins called Wise an honest creationist because he is willing to accept creationism even if he admitted "all the evidence in the universe" was against it:

Kurt Wise doesn't need the challenge; he volunteers that, even if all the evidence in the universe flatly contradicted Scripture, and even if he had reached the point of admitting this to himself, he would still take his stand on Scripture and deny the evidence. This leaves me, as a scientist, speechless... We have it on the authority of a man who may well be creationism's most highly qualified and most intelligent scientist that no evidence, no matter how overwhelming, no matter how all-embracing, no matter how devastatingly convincing, can ever make any difference.

Further, in his book The God Delusion, Dawkins referred to Wise's denial of science over creationism:

[The] Kurt Wise story is just plain pathetic – pathetic and contemptible. The wound, to his career and his life’s happiness, was self-inflicted, so unnecessary, so easy to escape. All he had to do was toss out the bible. Or interpret it symbolically, or allegorically, as the theologians do. Instead, he did the fundamentalist thing and tossed out science, evidence and reason, along with all his dreams and hopes.

== Books ==
- Kurt Wise, Faith, Form, and Time: What the Bible Teaches and Science Confirms About Creation and the Age of the Universe. B&H Publishing Group, 2002. ISBN 0-8054-2462-8
- Kurt Wise and Sheila A. Richardson, Something from Nothing: Understanding What You Believe About Creation and Why. (B&H Publishing Group, January 2004) ISBN 0-8054-2779-1
- Kurt Wise, Devotional Biology. (Compass Classroom, July 2018) ISBN 978-0999040928
