= Museum of Creation and Earth History =

Young earth creationist museum in California

Coordinates: 32°50′42.97″N 116°57′34.59″W

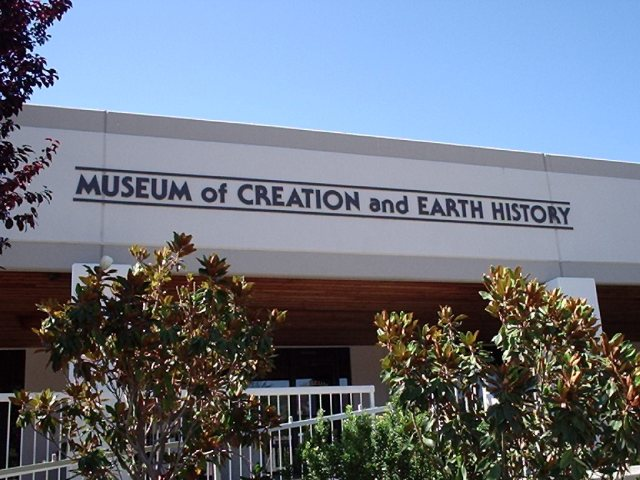
Creation and Earth History Museum at the Institute for Creation Research

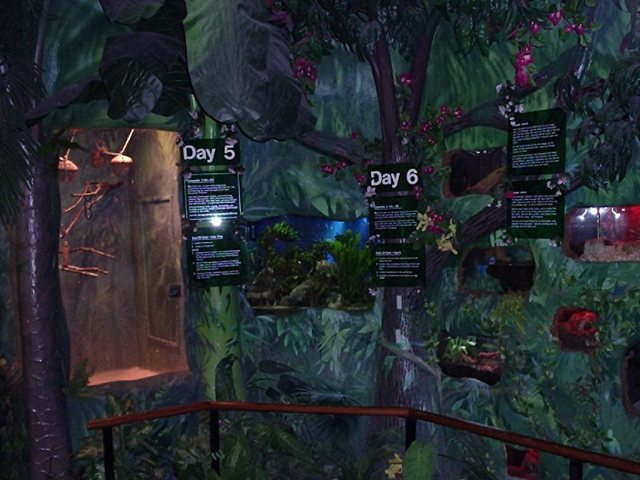
Garden of Eden exhibit at the Museum of Creation and Earth History

The Creation and Earth History Museum is a young earth creationist promotional facility opened by the Institute for Creation Research at its original headquarters in Santee, California, in 1992, replacing an earlier museum located in the institute's basement. It cost $50,000, and took 2 years to complete.

After the Institute for Creation Research moved from Santee to Dallas, Texas, in 2008, it sold the Museum to the Life and Light Foundation, a non-profit ministry run by Tom Cantor.

The exhibits claim to prove that the Earth is no older than about 10,000 years, and suggest that man and dinosaurs coexisted before Noah's flood, which also created the Grand Canyon. Also featured are an interpreted walk through the Garden of Eden with a literal depiction of the six days in the Genesis, a dark room with pictures of the planets and stars, scale models of Noah's Ark and the Tower of Babel, an Ice Age room, the Canyon Wall, describing how the Grand Canyon was formed in a matter of weeks or months, rather than the millions of years posited by most geologists, and the Hall of Scholars with pictures and biographies of scientists who believed in creationism rather than accepting evolution. It also has a display about the ICR's RATE project, an effort, in conjunction with other young Earth creationist organizations, to find evidence of a young earth.

In 2013, the Museum was denied accreditation by the San Diego Museum Council.
