= Institute for Creation Research =

American creationist apologetics organization

- Type: Young Earth creationist apologetics
- Established: 1970
- Founder: Henry M. Morris
- Chairman: Richard Bliss
- President: Randy Guliuzza
- Faculty: 8 full time
- Students: (online classes) either about 30 or more than 50, depending on source
- Location: Dallas, Texas, United States
- Website: www.icr.org

The Institute for Creation Research (ICR) is a creationist apologetics institute in Dallas, Texas, that specializes in media promotion of pseudoscientific creation science and interpretation of the Genesis creation narrative as a historical event. The ICR adopts English translations of the Bible as an inerrant and literal documentary of scientific and historical fact as well as religious and moral truths, and espouses a Young Earth creationist worldview. It rejects evolutionary biology, which it views as a corrupting moral and social influence and threat to religious belief. The ICR was formed by Henry M. Morris in 1972 following an organizational split with the Creation Science Research Center (CSRC).

Its work in the field of creation science has been rejected by science, but has been significant in shaping creationist thought in the United States by introducing creation science through fundamentalist churches and religious schools, and by engaging in public debates against supporters of evolution. The ICR also offers unaccredited graduate level programs in Biblical Apologetics, including a minor in Creation Research. The ICR also operates the ICR Discovery Center for Science & Earth History museum in Dallas, Texas.

== History ==
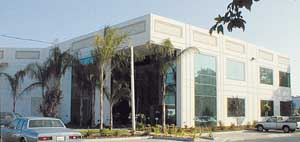
Institute for Creation Research in Santee, CA

The origins of the ICR can be traced to the Creation Science Research Center set up by Henry M. Morris, along with Nell and Kelly Segraves, at the Christian Heritage College (now San Diego Christian College) in 1970. However, the Segraveses and Morris disagreed on the focus of the center, with the Segraveses favoring political and promotional activities, whilst Morris favored educational and scientific efforts. This led to the breakup of the center in 1972, with the Segraveses taking control of the center and severing ties with the university, with Morris reorganising the remaining staff into the Institute for Creation Research.

The ICR defined its work in terms of three ministries: research, writing and speaking. Historian of science Ronald L. Numbers states that "[d]espite its name, the institute for years conducted little research outside the confines of its modest library" and cites (founding member) Duane Gish as "explain[ing] apologetically in 1978, [that] the staff devoted much of its research effort to scouring the scientific literature for references favorable to creationism." Numbers does note that it engaged in a number of archaeological and geological expeditions, including two in search of the mythical Noah's Ark, with geologist Steven A. Austin, working as an "off and on" visiting scientist until taking a full staff position in 1979, single-handedly conducting most of its non-literary research. Influential scientific creationist Walter E. Lammerts complained that "[t]he main trouble is that Henry looks at this whole thing as a sort of 'missionary' effort rather than a scientific one." It maintained tax-exempt status as a religious institution carrying out "non-scientific research."

In the early 1980s, the ICR severed its ties with Christian Heritage College to downplay its religious connections and portray itself as secular scientific institution. Ken Ham, a speaker and former high school science teacher in Australia, once worked for the ICR producing a series of seminars "Back to Genesis". In 1994 Ham left ICR to found what would become Answers in Genesis (AiG). Currently, at least one ICR staff member is also on staff at AiG.

In 1985, the ICR helped Turkey's education minister Vehbi Dinçerler, introduce Islamic creationism in Turkish high schools.

In 1987, the ICR's statement of belief was cited in the U.S. Supreme Court ruling of Edwards v. Aguillard. Justice Lewis F. Powell Jr. wrote that "If no valid secular purpose can be identified, then the statute violates the Establishment Clause." He continued noting information on ICR and Creation Research Society including "a review of their goals and activities sheds light on the nature of creation science." He then explained, "the intent of the Louisiana Legislature was to promote a particular religious belief" and the court ruled that teaching creationism was unconstitutional.

In 1992, the ICR opened the Museum of Creation and Earth History. When the ICR moved from Santee, California to Dallas, Texas, the ICR sold the museum to the Life and Light Foundation, a non-profit ministry run by Tom Cantor, in 2008.

With the Creation Research Society, ICR released statements in 2005 about the RATE (Radioisotopes and the Age of The Earth) project, providing a young-Earth creationist perspective on dating techniques like radiometric dating. RATE claimed that evidence supported over 500 million years of radiometric decay at today's rates but that it also supported a young earth. It speculated that nuclear decay rates must have accelerated by a factor of approximately one billion on the first two days of the Creation week and during the Flood. Non-affiliated experts who have scrutinised the claims have unanimously rejected them as flawed, noting that the integrity of science was compromised in favor of a message affirming the reliability of the Bible. RATE was chaired by Larry Vardiman and included Steven A. Austin, John Baumgardner, Steven W. Boyd, Eugene F. Chaffin, Donald B. DeYoung, Russell Humphreys and Andrew Snelling.

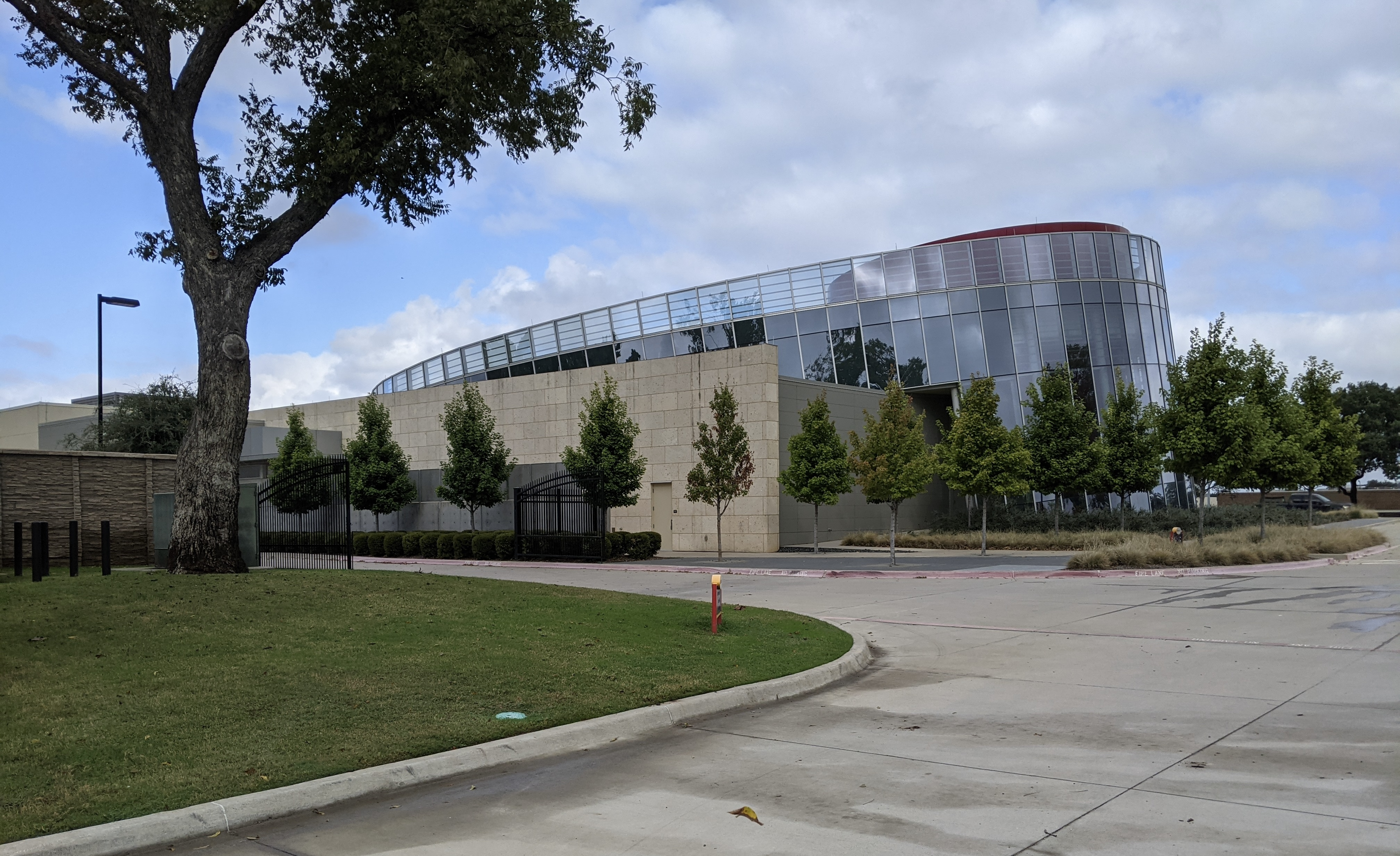
The ICR Discovery Center for Science & Earth History is a young Earth creationist museum run by ICR in Dallas, Texas.

In 2007, the institute relocated from Santee, California, to Dallas, Texas. Morris, who died the previous year, said the move was intended to give the ICR a central national location, Dallas' proximity to a major airport, and a larger population for their ministry. For FYE 2007, the Institute had net assets of $7,613,461. In 2009, the ICR had a revenue of $8,042,283 with net assets of $9,857,656.

On September 2, 2019, the ICR opened the ICR Discovery Center for Science & Earth History museum in Dallas, Texas.

Morris's son, Henry M. Morris III, died on December 12, 2020. The younger Morris had been ICR's CEO.

== Research and publications ==
In a 1995 review of work published by ICR researchers, Douglas J. Futuyma writes, "Neither in the creationist literature nor in the scientific literature have I found any reference to professional research by these individuals in genetics, paleontology, taxonomy, anatomy, or any of the other fields most relevant to the study of evolution." He found their work most often published instead by an overtly religious publishing house, Creation-Life Publishers.

== Master Books ==
Master Books is a division within Creation-Life Publishers, another enterprise Morris helped to found. It serves as the publishing arm of the Institute for Creation Research, and specializes in theology and creation science works. Master Books' anti-evolution books are in wide distribution, promoted by most of the large creationist organizations as well as the ICR.

== School and accreditation ==
In June 1981, the ICR received formal state approval in California to offer degree programs in science. In 1988, the ICR sought re-approval. A five-person committee from the California Department of Education sent to evaluate ICR's degree program found its graduate school consisted of only five full-time faculty and some courses were videotaped rather than professor-led instruction. The committee failed to grant re-approval by 3–2 vote, a move the ICR attributed to "religious intolerance" rather than criticisms of the quality of education it provided. This resulted in California's State Superintendent of Public Instruction barring the institute from granting master's degrees in science, which encompassed their existing graduate degree programs in the teaching of biology, geology, astrogeophysics and science.

ICR filed a lawsuit against California's State Superintendent, Bill Honig, and was awarded a settlement of $225,000 permission to continue its program until 1995, so long as it continued to teach evolution alongside creationism. The original agreement expired in 1995, and California Bureau for Private Postsecondary and Vocational Education (BPPVE) granted the ICR religious exemption from postsecondary school requirements in California.

In 1982, the ICR received accreditation from the Transnational Association of Christian Colleges and Schools (TRACS), a private fundamentalist creationist schools accreditation agency. TRACS was officially recognized as an accreditor by the US Department of Education in 1991. Following the ICR's move to Dallas, in November 2007, TRACS terminated its accredited status. Texas does not recognize TRACS' accreditation.

The ICR's relocation to Texas required Texas state approval or accreditation by a regional accrediting agency, in this case Southern Association of Colleges and Schools (SACS). In 2007, the ICR applied for a temporary state certification there which would have allowed the institute to operate while it pursues accreditation through SACS. In December 2007, the Texas Higher Education Coordinating Board (THECB) received an advisory committee recommendation to allow the ICR to start offering online master's degrees in science education.

The Board originally planned to decide on the issue at their January 2008 meeting. At the time it applied, ICR graduate school had approximately 30 to 50 students, most teachers from private Christian schools or home-schoolers, and four full-time faculty.

After seeking the advice from an independent panel, the Chairman of the Texas Board requested information about the research conducted by the faculty, how an on-line program would expose students to the experimental side of science, and asked why "[t]heir curriculum doesn't line up very well with the curriculum available in conventional master of science programs." Subsequently, the ICR asked the THECB to delay its decision until their next meeting to give them time to respond. Inside Higher Ed reported "lobbying — by scientists against the institute, and by others in its favor — is going strong."

The Dallas Morning News obtained some of the messages sent to the board and published a number of examples and summaries that illustrated how intense the debate had become. Following the response from the ICR to the Board, Steven Schafersman, of the Texas Citizens for Science, reported that the ICR sent out "prayer requests" and is currently arguing a creationist derived distinction of science in their application for approval.

On April 23, 2008, education board's Academic Excellence and Research Committee unanimously voted against allowing the ICR to issue science degrees citing "the institute's program is infused with creationism and runs counter to conventions of science that hold that claims of supernatural intervention are not testable and therefore lie outside the realm of science." On the following day the full Board unanimously voted against allowing the ICR to issue science degrees. The decision was "based the recommendation on two considerations:

1. ICR failed to demonstrate that the proposed degree program meets acceptable standards of science and science education.
2. The proposed degree is inconsistent with Coordinating Board rules which require the accurate labeling or designation of programs … Since the proposed degree program inadequately covers key areas of science, it cannot be properly designated either as 'science' or 'science education.'"

The ICR said it would appeal the decision saying the Education Board was guilty of "viewpoint discrimination". Instead, in April 2009, the ICR sued the THECB in federal court for imposing "an unconstitutional and prejudicial burden against ICRGS's academic freedom and religious liberties" and asked for the ability to award science degrees. In June 2010, a judge ruled in favor of the Texas Higher Education saying the ICR "is entirely unable to file a complaint which is not overly verbose, disjointed, incoherent, maundering and full of irrelevant information." The judge concluded, "The Court simply comes to the conclusion, which is inescapable, that the [THECB] decision was rationally related to a legitimate state interest." In the September 2010 ICR newsletter, Henry Morris III, the ICR's chief executive officer, wrote "ICR's legal battle is over" after the Judge ruled in favor of the Texas Board.

In 2010, the ICR board of directors voted to close the ICR Graduate School and open a School of Biblical Apologetics, offering a Master of Christian Education degree with Creation Research being one of four minors. The ICR noted that "Due to the nature of ICR's School of Biblical Apologetics — a predominantly religious education school — it is exempt from licensing by the Texas Higher Education Coordinating Board.

== Criticism ==
=== Scientific criticism ===
Young-earth creationism is rejected by nearly all scientists, including most scientists who hold to the Christian faith, with more than 45 science organizations having criticized creationism as not science. Professor Massimo Pigliucci, a professor of ecology and evolution at the State University of New York at Stony Brook, has criticized ICR for professing to present the same science as that taught in secular universities while at the same time requiring students and faculty to sign a statement of faith to ICR's fundamentalist religious mission, most notably in affirming conformity in all its work to Biblical doctrine. Pigliucci notes that any research conducted within the ICR's policy framework is prescribed at the outset by Biblical literalism, and thus antithetical to the methods and framework used by scientists. As examples, Pigliucci cites ICR scientist Harold Slusher resorting to non-Euclidean and non-Einsteinian explanations of light travel to reconcile the vast distances light travels in space with the brief timescale given in young earth creationism, and the association adopted by the ICR between the second principle of thermodynamics and the Bible's account of the fall of Adam. Pigliucci further claimed that "some of the historical claims found in the ICR museum are also stunning and show how easily ideology gets the better of accuracy."

On January 7, 2007, the National Center for Science Education reported that Grand Canyon: A Different View, edited by Tom Vail and published by Master Books, the publishing arm of the Institute for Creation Research, and described as promoting "a young-earth creationist view of the geology of the Grand Canyon," was facing new scrutiny by Public Employees for Environmental Responsibility (PEER) in December 2006. The Chief of the Park Service's Geologic Resources Division recommended its removal on grounds that it "does not use accurate, professional and scholarly knowledge; is not based on science but a specific religious doctrine; does not further the public's understanding of the Grand Canyon's existence; [and] does not further the mission of the National Park Service". A report by the National Center for Science Education, written by Chemist Karen Bartelt was critical of the ICR representatives and displays in the "museum".

=== Criticism from old Earth creationists ===
Old Earth creationists are opposed to the ICR. Gary North opposes the ICR on the grounds that they think the second principle of thermodynamics contradicts evolution, and John W. Robbins considers the ICR's activities a "fraud". The old-Earth creationist organization Answers In Creation criticizes the ICR, including a critical review by Kevin R. Henke of the ICR's dating claims. Henke concluded that the ICR's "research" was improperly conducted and "was unsuccessful in adequately separating the volcanic glass from the much older minerals". Another creationist opponent of ICR and its doctrine is Hugh Ross, who accepts the scientific consensus of a 4.54 billion year old Earth and is critical of ICR's cosmological models as well as their attempts to solve the starlight problem.

=== Criticism over awarding degrees ===
The ICR attracted much opposition when it sought approval (unsuccessfully) in Texas to operate a master's degree program in science education. An April 2008 survey by Texas Freedom Network showed the majority of science faculties in Texas are opposed to ICR's request to issue science degrees with 185 (95% of respondents) opposed to certifying the program and 6 (3%) in favor. Officials of the institute state their goal is to integrate Biblical creationism with science. Since their program is intended to prepare students who are or will become teachers, the developing program is controversial. In public statements, ICR officials said that scientific literacy would be emphasized, but science advocates critical of the ICR said the institute's true goal is to restore religious creationism to science classes in the public schools. Texas declined to accredit the ICR science program (see above).
