= Robert Schadewald =

American writer and science educator (1943–2000)

Robert J. (Bob) Schadewald (February 19, 1943 in Rogers, MN – March 12, 2000) was an author, researcher, and former president of the National Center for Science Education (NCSE). An internationally recognized expert on pseudoscience, Schadewald penned numerous articles on creationism, perpetual motion, flat Earthism, and other pseudoscience for such magazines as Science 80, Technology Illustrated, Smithsonian, and Science Digest.

He wrote one book, a computer guide titled The dBASE (II) Guide for Small Business, and contributed chapters to six others, including the reference text The History of Science and Religion in the Western Tradition: An Encyclopedia, edited by Gary B. Ferngren. Much of his published work deals with unorthodoxies of science and scholarship.

== Studying unorthodox ideas and people ==
Schadewald studied and wrote about unorthodox ideas and the people who promote them. He attended at least a dozen national creationism conferences, interviewed Immanuel Velikovsky, investigated perpetual motion machines, and got thrown out of the International Flat Earth Research Society for his "spherical" tendencies.

Schadewald was the last person to interview Immanuel Velikovsky, the interview occurred six days before Velikovsky's death in 1979. Schadewald was preparing an article on Velikovsky to be published on the 30 year anniversary of the publication of Velikovsky's best seller Worlds in Collision (The MacMillan Company, New York, 1950). The interview can be accessed in the original article in FATE magazine, or in the collection of Schadewald's writings Worlds of Their Own (Xlibris, Philadelphia, 2008).

Schadewald also investigated several perpetual motion schemes and reported on them from the mid-1970s to the mid-1980s. Some of the contemporary perpetual motionists that Schadewald studied were: Arnold Burke, Tom Ogle, Howard Johnson, Dr. Keith Kenyon, Rory C. Johnson and Joseph Westley Newman.

Schadewald's search for works advocating unorthodox science or scholarship took him to dozens of major research libraries in United States and the United Kingdom. Along the way, he also accumulated an extensive personal library. It consisted of about a thousand volumes advocating various unorthodox ideas: hollow-Earth, geocentricity, creationism, Velikovskyism, perpetual motion, racism, antisemitism, anti-Catholicism, Bigfoot, the Loch Ness monster, flying saucers, bizarre religions, and so forth, as well as the world's most extensive collection of 19th and 20th century flat-Earth literature. Much of this collection is now housed at the University of Wisconsin at Madison in the Special Collections library as the Robert Schadewald Collection on Pseudo-Science.

== Creationism, perpetual motion, flat Earth ==
Schadewald was a nationally recognized expert on creationism, perpetual motion, and flat Earth belief. As an authority on pseudoscience, he appeared on radio talk shows in Minneapolis, Des Moines, Chicago, Seattle, Pittsburgh, and Philadelphia and on the Pittsburgh Today television talk show. He also gave guest lectures on writing and various aspects of pseudoscience at numerous colleges and universities.

One of Schadewald's main strategies in exposing Creationism as pseudoscience was to compare it with flat Earthism and examine the parallels between the two beliefs. Schadewald contended, they concur on a number of issues, including the authority of the scriptures as a scientific guide to the natural world, the limitations of a theory-led approach, the duplicity of conventional scientists, and the impossibility of reconciling orthodox science with the Bible.

"Robert Schadewald befriended Johnson (Charles Johnson, President of the International Flat Earth Research Society ca. 1971 until his death in 2001) and his wife Marjory, writing several articles on the movement that illustrated the intellectual history and themes linking the creationist movement with both flat-Earth and geocentrist belief (see, for examples, Schadewald's "Looking for lighthouses" in Creation/Evolution 1992; 12 [2]: 1-4 and his "The evolution of Bible-science" in Scientists Confront Creationism, ed. Laurie Godfrey, New York: WW Norton, 1983, 283-99)."

== Opposition to creation science (intelligent design) ==
At the time of his death, Schadewald had been active for almost 20 years in the effort to keep "creation science," which he considered a thinly disguised religious doctrine, out of public school science classrooms. In 1983 he began attending creationist conferences, attending six major conferences in addition to the 1986, 1990, 1994 and 1998 International Conference on Creationism. He reported on these with articles in the Skeptical Inquirer and Reports of the National Center for Science Education. From 1986 to 1992, he served on the board of directors of the National Center for Science Education, including two years as president.

== Bibliography ==
Books

- 2008 Worlds of Their Own; A Brief History of Misguided Ideas: Creationism, Flat-Earthism, Energy Scams, and the Velikovsky Affair. (A collection of Schadewald's writings, edited and published posthumously) ISBN 978-1-4363-0435-1 (hardcover) ISBN 978-1-4363-0434-4 (paperback)
- 1984 The dBASE II Guide for Small Business. Prentice Hall, ISBN 978-0-8359-1245-7

Book Chapters

- "The Evolution of Bible-science." In Scientists Confront Creationism, edited by Laurie Godfrey. New York: W. W. Norton, 1983.
- "Six 'Flood' Arguments Creationists Can't Answer." In Evolution vs. Creationism, edited by J. Peter Zetterberg. Phoenix: Oryx Press, 1983.
- "Devices that Count." In Humanizing the Computer, edited by Douglas Flaherty. Belmont, CA: Wadsworth Inc., 1986.
- "Creationist Pseudoscience." In Scientists Confront the Paranormal, edited by Kendrick Frazier. Buffalo, NY: Prometheus Press, 1986.
- "The Perpetual Quest." In The Fringes of Reason: A Whole Earth Catalog, edited by Ted Schultz. New York: Harmony Books, 1989.
- "The Flat-Earth Movement." In The Fringes of Reason: A Whole Earth Catalog, edited by Ted Schultz. New York: Harmony Books, 1989.
- "Geocentricity." In The History of Science and Religion in the Western Tradition: An Encyclopedia, edited by Gary B. Ferngren. New York & London: Garland Publishing Inc., 2000.
- "Flat-Earthism." In The History of Science and Religion in the Western Tradition: An Encyclopedia, edited by Gary B. Ferngren. New York & London: Garland Publishing Inc., 2000.

Periodical Articles

- 1976: "A Forgotten Pioneer," Air Line Pilot, November 1976, pp. 11–13. (Lawsonomy.)
- 1977: "David Lang Vanishes . . . Forever," Fate, November, pp. 54–60. (A phony mystery debunked.)
  "The Plane Truth," TWA Ambassador, December, pp. 42–43. (Interview with president of Flat Earth Society.)
- 1978: "'What Goes Up' . . . Is Basis for a Breakthrough," Science Digest, April, pp. 10–11. (Perpetual motion.)
  "If Electricity-through-Ground Idea Works, Power Could Be Dirt-Cheap," Minneapolis Star, June 6, p. 1C. (Teslamania.)
  "He Knew Earth is Round, but His Proof Fell Flat", Smithsonian, April, pp. 101–113. (The history of a little-known wager between evolutionist Alfred Russel Wallace and flat-Earther John Hampden.)
  "Fortean Fakes and Folklore," Pursuit, Summer, pp. 98–100. (Phony mysteries debunked.)
  "Metrication: Even Pyramid Power Won't Save the Sacred Inch," TWA Ambassador, August, pp. 78.
  "'Power-Magnifying Transmitter' Still a Mystery", Science Digest, December, pp. 37–41. (Teslamania.)
  "Electricity That's Penny-Cheap? Inventor's Scheme Stirs Up a Perpetual Commotion," Minneapolis Star Saturday magazine, December 2. (Debunking Arnold Burke's machine with coauthor Deborah Weathers.)
- 1979: "Biorhythms: A Critical Look at Critical Days," Fate, February, pp. 75–80.
  "The Hollow Earth Catalog", TWA Ambassador, April, pp. 39–43. (Review of pseudoscientific organizations.)
  "Creationism: Palming Off Religious Dogma as Science", Minneapolis Star, April 4, 1979, p. 10A. (Guest editorial.)
  "A Flip(per) Answer to the Loch Ness Mystery", TWA Ambassador, August, pp. 26–28.
  "The Search for Noah's Ark: A Mountain of Evidence but No Answers", TWA Ambassador, November, pp. 30–32.
- 1980: "Velikovsky: His Controversies Seem Fated to Live On and On," Science Digest, March, pp. 93–96.
  "Velikovsky: The Last Interview," Fate, May, pp. 80–89.
  "The Flat-Out Truth: Earth Orbits? Moon Landings? A Fraud! Says This Prophet," Science Digest, July, pp. 58–63. (Interview with president of Flat Earth Society.)
  "The Perpetual Quest," Science 80, November, p. 98. (Debunking perpetual motion schemes.)
- 1980: "Is the World in Curious Shape?" Isaac Asimov's Science Fiction Magazine, v. 4, n. 12 (December), pp. 97–106. (Some think the earth is flat or hollow.)
  "Recent Developments in Perpetual Motion," Skeptical Inquirer, Winter 1980–1981, pp. 25–33. (Debunking perpetual motion schemes.)
  "Perpetual Motion for the Farm: Can We Get Something for Nothing?" Farm Energy, January, pp. 13–15. (Debunking perpetual motion schemes.)
- 1981: "Energy for Free," BMW Journal, January, pp. 45–48. (Debunking perpetual motion schemes.)
  "Earth's Poles Don't Shift," Fate, October, pp. 114–120. (Debunking predictions of a catastrophic pole shift by the end of the century.)
  "If Continents Can Wander, Why not Planets?," Isaac Asimov's Science Fiction Magazine, n. 5, n. 10 (September 28), pp. 84–95. (Critique of Velikovsky.)
  "Scientific Creationism, Geocentricity, and the Flat Earth," Skeptical Inquirer, Winter 1981–1982, pp. 41–47.
  "Moon and Spencer and the Small Universe," Creation/Evolution, Spring, pp. 20–22. (Is the universe really only 15.7 light-years across?)
  "Equal Time for Flat-Earth Science," Creation/Evolution, Winter, pp. 37–41. (A "model bill" to guarantee fairness in education.)
- 1982: "Free Energy," Technology Illustrated, April/May, p. 92. (An old perpetual motion scheme revisited.)
  "Six 'Flood' Arguments Creationists Can't Answer," Creation/Evolution, Summer, pp. 12–17.
  "A Surge of Reason," Science 82, November, pp. 85–88. (Creationism.)
  "A Philosopher Rebuts Creationism," Minneapolis Tribune, December 26, p. 15D. (Review of Philip Kitcher's Abusing Science: The Case Against Creationism.)
- 1983: "Scientific Creationists Are Not Catastrophists," Creation/Evolution, Spring, pp. 22–25.
  "Creationist Pseudoscience," Skeptical Inquirer, Fall, pp. 22–35.
  "Creationist Conference Recasts Physics, Cosmology, and Geology," Skeptical Inquirer, Winter 1983–1984, pp. 98–101.
  1984: "The 1984 National Bible-Science Conference," Creation/Evolution Newsletter, v. 4, n. 3 (May/June), pp. 15–16.
  "Scientific Creationism, Geocentricity, and the Flat Earth," Free Thought Today, December, pp. 10–12.
  "America's Mystery Creatures," Vista USA, Winter 1984-1985, pp. 6–8. (A skeptical look at Bigfoot et al.)
  "Bible Conference: Emphasis on Geocentricity," Skeptical Inquirer, Winter 1984–1985, pp. 111–113.
  "Reverend Carl Baugh's Dinosaur," Creation/Evolution Newsletter, v. 4, n. 6 (November/December), p. 19. (Creationist paleontology.)
- 1985: "The Gospel of Creation: The Book of Misinformation," Minnesota Daily, February 14, p. 8.
  "Gish at the University of Minnesota," Creation/Evolution Newsletter, v. 5, n. 2 (March/April), pp. 15–16. (Creationism.)
  "The Missionary of Creationism," Skeptical Inquirer, v. 9, n. 3 (Spring), pp. 290–292. (Review of Henry Morris's History of Modern Creationism.)
  "The 1985 National Bible-Science Conference," Creation/Evolution Newsletter, v. 5, n. 4 (July/August), pp. 17–22.
  "Baugh's Dinosaur: Paleontology on the Paluxy," Skeptical Inquirer, v. 9, n. 4 (Summer), pp. 312–313. (Creationism.)
- 1986: "Scientific Creationism and Error," Creation/Evolution, v. 6, n. 1, pp. 1–9.
  "The 1986 International Conference on Creationism," Creation/Evolution Newsletter, v. 6, n. 5 (September/October), pp. 8–14.
- 1987: "Creationism in St. Cloud, Minnesota," Creation/Evolution Newsletter, v. 7, n. 1 (January/February), pp. 14–16.
  "Gentry's Tiny Mystery," Creation/Evolution Newsletter, v. 7, n. 2 (March/April), p. 20. (Pleochroic haloes found in rocks.)
  "A Brief History of the Flat-Earth Movement," Bulletin of the Tychonian Society, n. 44 (July), pp. 13–17.
- 1987: "The Flat-Earth Bible," Bulletin of the Tychonian Society, n. 44 (July), pp. 27–39. (The Bible is a flat-earth book from Genesis to Revelation.)
  "The 1987 National Creation Conference," Creation/Evolution Newsletter, v. 7, n. 6 (November/December), pp. 17–22.
- 1988: "Review of The Perpetual Motion Mystery: A Continuing Quest, by R. A. Ford," Fate, February, pp. 111–112.
  "NCSE Symposium in Boston," Creation/Evolution Newsletter, v. 8, n. 2 (March/April), pp. 3–4.
  "The ICR Summer Institute, July 11–15, 1988," Creation/Evolution Newsletter, v. 8, n. 5 (September/October), p. 14–16.
- 1989: "The Earth Was Flat in Zion," Fate, May 1989, pp. 70–79.
- 1991: "Selling Pandas." NCSE Reports, 11(1), pp. 10–11.
- 1998: "The 1998 International Conference on Creationism," RNCSE 18 (3): 22–25, 33.
