= Kent Hovind =

American young Earth creationist (born 1953)

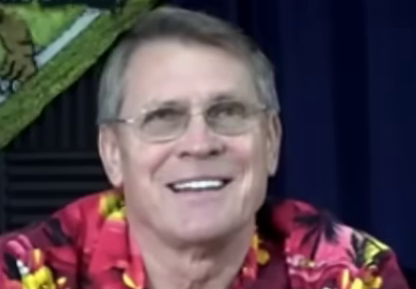
- Hovind in 2020
- Born: Kent E. Hovind; 1953 (age 72–73); East Peoria, Illinois, U.S.
- Education: Midwestern Baptist College (BRE)
- Known for: Advocate of Young Earth creationism and anti-tax views
- Spouses: Jo Delia McGinnis (m. 1973; div. 2016) Mary Tocco (m. 2016, divorced) Cindi Lincoln (m. 2018, divorced)
- Children: 3
- Kent Hovind's voice Hovind debating the validity of evolution with science YouTuber Professor Dave; Recorded January 2020

Kent E. Hovind (Note: Hovind has stated that he has no middle name, with his father having given him and all his siblings simply the initial E) (born 1953) is an American young Earth creationist and tax protestor. His ministry focuses on denial of accepted scientific knowledge in the fields of biology (evolution and abiogenesis), geophysics, and cosmology in favor of a literalist interpretation of the Genesis creation narrative found in the Bible. Hovind's views, which combine elements of creation science and conspiracy theory, are dismissed by the scientific community as fringe theory and pseudo-scholarship. Answers in Genesis, a fundamentalist organization advocating young Earth creationism, openly criticized him for continued use of discredited arguments abandoned by others in the movement.

Hovind established Creation Science Evangelism (CSE) in 1989 and Dinosaur Adventure Land in 2001 in Pensacola, Florida. He frequently spoke on Young Earth creationism in schools, churches, debates, and on radio and television broadcasts. His son Eric Hovind took over operation of CSE after Hovind began serving a 10-year prison sentence in January 2007 for federal convictions for failing to pay taxes, obstructing federal agents, and structuring cash transactions. In September 2021, Hovind was convicted of domestic violence against his estranged wife.

== Early life and education ==
Hovind was born in 1953 in East Peoria, Illinois. At the age of 16, Hovind became a born-again Christian within the Independent Fundamental Baptist church.

In 1971, he graduated from East Peoria Community High School in East Peoria, Illinois. He entered Illinois Central College and then transferred to the unaccredited Midwestern Baptist College in 1972, attaining a Bachelor of Religious Education in 1974.

In 1988 and 1991 respectively, Hovind received a master's degree and doctorate in Christian Education through correspondence from (also unaccredited) Patriot University, then in Colorado Springs, Colorado. Patriot University is a diploma mill.

== Career ==
Between 1975 and 1988, Hovind served as an assistant pastor and teacher at three private Baptist schools, including one he started.

In 1998, Hovind created his Dr. Dino web site and began producing articles and selling video tapes, books, and fossil replicas. Prior to his incarceration, Hovind had numerous speaking engagements (around 700 in 2004) at churches, private schools, and other venues each year, in addition to hosting a daily internet radio talk show and establishing Dinosaur Adventure Land in Pensacola, Florida.

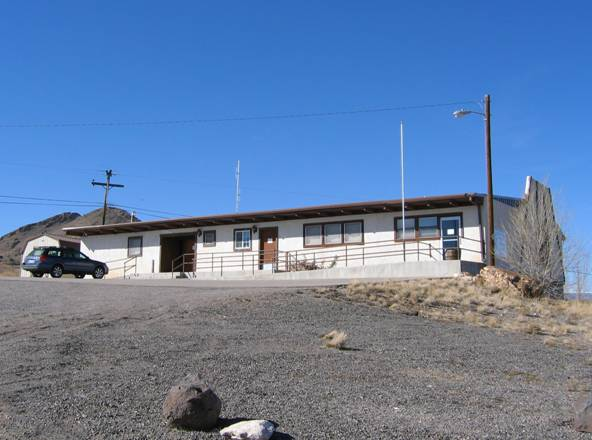
Patriot University

Having a website called "Dr. Dino" has provoked some academics to look closely at how Hovind presents his education and credentials. All his known degrees are from unaccredited institutions, and he has no training in paleontology. Barbara Forrest, a professor of philosophy, expert on the history of creationism and activist in the creation–evolution controversy, wrote that Hovind's lack of training makes academic discussion impossible and has said that his understanding of historical and scientific research is deficient. Karen Bartelt, an organic chemistry professor who debated Hovind, examined Hovind's dissertation and found it is incomplete, (Note: It contains four chapters totaling 101 pages, but Hovind's introduction claims the work is 250 pages with 16 chapters.) contains numerous spelling errors, lacks references, shows flawed reasoning, and states that it does not present any original research.

=== Creation Science Evangelism and Creation Today ===
Hovind established Creation Science Evangelism in 1989 to evangelize and teach creationism. In May 1999, his son Eric joined Creation Science Evangelism as a speaker, and his daughter Marlissa began training to become Hovind's secretary. That year, CSE merged with Faith Baptist Fellowship of Hawthorne, Florida, beginning a relationship that lasted until 2002. In 2003, with the aid of Glenn Stoll (a promoter of tax-avoidance schemes), Hovind set up a series of entities starting with "an unincorporated association of pure trust" on May 13, under which a corporation sole and several ministerial trusts were established starting on May 23. CSE properties were conveyed to the trusts which operated under business licenses from the "Kingdom of Heaven".

Hovind is associated with the Unregistered Baptist Fellowship (UBF), a loosely affiliated group of roughly 100 churches which share a "theology of Christian resistance" to civil governments. Because the UBF would consider it an acknowledgement of government authority over the church, they reject the highly favorable 501(c)(3) status, which makes donations tax deductible and exempts them from income tax, but not FICA taxes or employee income tax withholding. The UBF holds that governmental authority stops "at the threshold of the church", and Hovind has likened his ministry's status to that of the Vatican City State. When the federal government obtained a search warrant in 2004, an Internal Revenue Service (IRS) criminal investigator made the sworn statement that the organization did not have a business license and did not have tax-exempt status.

Hovind was convicted of 58 felony counts in November 2006 and sentenced to 10 years in prison in January 2007; Eric Hovind took over Creation Science Evangelism. In July 2007, God Quest Inc. was incorporated with Eric Hovind as president, and that November, God Quest Inc. filed in Florida to do business under the trade name Creation Science Evangelism. In June 2008, Eric announced that the CSE website would incorporate the CSE blog and change format allowing for "only positive comments" about Hovind and CSE, and in late 2011, Creation Science Evangelism's DrDino.com website was redirected to CreationToday.org. The new website announced "Creation Today is a ministry of God Quest, Inc." with focus on "creation, apologetics and evangelism."

=== Dinosaur Adventure Land ===
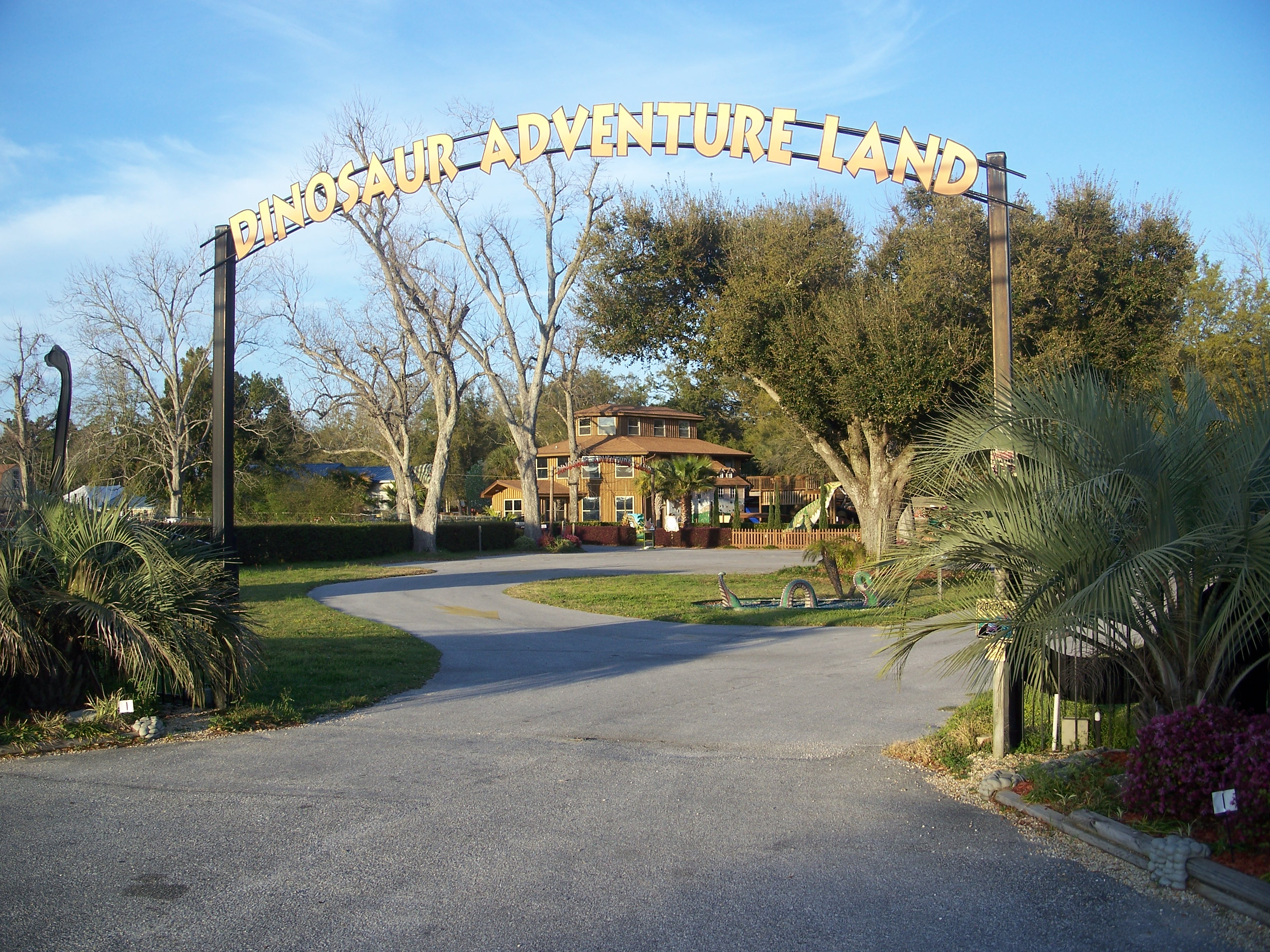
Entrance to the park

In 2001, Hovind started Dinosaur Adventure Land, a young Earth creationist theme park located behind Hovind's home in Pensacola. With the slogan, "Where Dinosaurs and the Bible meet!", the facility occupied roughly seven acres (three hectares) and had an indoor "Science Center" along with an outdoor space which had a variety of simple dinosaur-themed rides and activities, each of which was tied to some religious message. For example, the "Jumpasaurus" was a trampoline next to a basketball hoop; children would have one minute to make as many baskets as they could, and the message was that one has to be coordinated to do more for Jesus. Annual attendance was 38,000. The park depicted humans and dinosaurs co-existing in the last 4,000–6,000 years and also contains a depiction of the Loch Ness Monster. The Southern Poverty Law Center said the park also "claims that a few small dinosaurs still roam the planet". A 2004 Skeptical Inquirer article discussed a visit to Hovind's dinosaur theme park and concluded that the park is "deceptive on many levels". In Reports of the National Center for Science Education, George Allan Alderman described it as "essentially a playground with a few exhibits, several fiberglass dinosaurs, a climbing wall, and a couple of buildings." He summarized it as "shabby".

The venture encountered legal issues when the owners did not get a building permit in 2002 (see below). In April 2006, Escambia County officials closed the building in question. In July 2009, the courts ruled that the properties could be seized and sold to satisfy Hovind's criminal penalties (see below). Another Florida ministry theme park, the Holy Land Experience, successfully lobbied for a property tax exemption law for parks "used to exhibit, illustrate, and interpret biblical manuscripts" in 2006; Dinosaur Adventure Land, which was not a 501(c)(3) organization, failed to have the law expanded to be included. Eric Hovind kept the park and CSE operating throughout 2008, but in July 2009, a judge allowed the government seizure to proceed. In August 2009, Dinosaur Adventure Land's website announced it was closed, and CSE announced its re-opening as the "Creation Store" in November 2010.

In April 2016, Hovind discussed plans for a new Dinosaur Adventure Land, which included an 80-foot-tall model dinosaur that would be the largest in the state, with commissioners in Conecuh County, Alabama. A supporter donated a 140-acre (55-hectare) parcel of land in Lenox, Alabama, a former gravel pit. Volunteers started work by June 2016, and it opened in April 2018. As of September 2018, total attendance had exceeded 1,000, according to Hovind. Dinosaur Adventure Land is operated by a 501(c)(3) organization, Creation Science Evangelism Ministries Inc. Its revenue streams are donations, book and DVD sales, and YouTube advertising. There is no admission charge and it operates without liability insurance. Facilities include a science center, a campground, a four-wheeler park, and church services including baptisms.

On March 15, 2020, a seven-year-old boy drowned at the park.

== Personal life ==
He married his wife Jo Delia McGinnis in 1973 and they had three children between 1977 and 1979.

In 1989, the family moved to Pensacola, Florida, where Jo attended (then unaccredited) Pensacola Christian College and earned a bachelor's degree in music and master's degrees in music and sacred music.

In 1999, his son Eric Hovind began traveling to present his arguments and seminars. Kent and Jo divorced in 2016.

He married his second wife, Mary Tocco, on September 24, 2016 and his third wife Cindi Lincoln on July 20, 2018.

== Creationism ==
=== The Hovind Theory ===
Hovind presented a version of young Earth creationism he calls the "Hovind Theory" in lectures and in the book Unmasking the False Religion of Evolution. The Hovind Theory is entirely rejected in the scientific community, and its plausibility has even been criticized by other young Earth creationists.

In Hovind's narrative, dinosaurs and humans coexisted and Tyrannosaurus rex was a vegetarian prior to the fall of man. Hovind expands upon the late 19th- and early 20th-century vapor canopy concept of a protective shield that made Earth a relative paradise between the expulsion from Paradise and Noah's flood. The flood is expressed as a function of natural rather than miraculous processes. Noah's family and two of every kind of animal (including dinosaurs, which fit because babies were taken aboard and conditions allowed larger humans, making the ark's size, based on cubits, larger) boarded Noah's Ark before an ice meteor impacted the Earth. Fragments from the meteor caused planetary rings and impact craters on the moon and other solar system bodies. The remainder were drawn to the North and South Poles by the Earth's magnetic field as cataclysmic snowfall which buried the mammoths standing up. The ice on the poles cracked the Earth's crust, releasing the "fountains of the deep". According to Hovind, these events caused an ice age, and made the Earth wobble around, collapsing the vapor canopy that protected it.

In the next few months of the flood, the dead animals and plants were buried, and became oil, coal, and fossils. The last months of the flood included geological instability, when the plates shifted, forming ocean basins and mountain ranges. The Grand Canyon was formed in a couple of weeks during this time.

=== Criticism from creationists ===
In a rare case of open dissent within the movement over the substance of creation science, Answers in Genesis (AiG) published a 2002 position paper titled: "Arguments we think creationists should NOT use". After Hovind issued a point-by-point rebuttal, Carl Wieland, Ken Ham, and Jonathan Sarfati of AiG wrote that the claims made by Hovind were "fraudulent" and contained "mistakes in facts and logic which do the creationist cause no good." In particular, AiG criticized Hovind for "persistently us[ing] discredited or false arguments" as well as "fraudulent claims" from Ron Wyatt, and described one of Hovind's claims as "self-refuting". Rancorous disagreements resulted in AiG splitting into U.S. and Australian chapters in 2005. The Australian branch, renamed Creation Ministries International (CMI), maintained content critical of Hovind on their website, while the U.S. branch, led by Ken Ham, removed it. In 2009, CMI said that they had relaxed their stance because CSE's revamped website had removed some of Hovind's claims to which they objected.

Greg Neyman, an old-Earth creationist who runs the Old Earth Ministries website (renamed from Answers in Creation), writes that Hovind's articles about humans and dinosaurs coexisting are unsupported by evidence and that they "embarrass the young earth creation science community as a whole".

To the Orthodox Jewish creationist, Hovind's approach relies upon a strict literal reading of the King James translation. Where Jews interpret the Hebrew through Talmud and Midrash, Hovind relies on a direct reading of English. For example, Hovind claims that the word dinosaur, which was introduced to English in 1841, refers to what previously had been called dragon. Dragon is used where tannin (Hebrew: תנין) appears, but it means serpent or crocodile.

=== Anti-evolution claims ===
Hovind contends that "Darwinism" produced "Communism, Socialism, Nazism, abortion, liberalism and the New Age Movement". He blamed the forced Cherokee resettlement on a belief in evolution, although the Trail of Tears preceded On the Origin of Species, the book which first presents the theory of evolution by natural selection, by roughly two decades. Hovind maintains that biology textbooks are lying in order to brainwash youth. He said, "Satan is using evolution theory to make kids go to hell." Hovind claims he is not trying to eliminate evolution from schools, but says "schools should teach both viewpoints." Hovind said that in order to forge "missing link" transitional fossils to support human evolution, the Smithsonian Institution has 33,000 sets of human remains in its basement, some taken alive (murder). In an interview prior to speaking at Kent State University, Hovind said "You should have another rebellion here at Kent State and do it for the right reason," the reason being protesting evolution and referred to the Kent State shootings when he added, "This time, don't get shot."

In the pseudoscience of cryptozoology, Hovind published and co-authored Claws, Jaws, and Dinosaurs with William Gibbons, another Creationist who has searched for dinosaurs in the Congo under the belief that discovering a cryptid would somehow undermine evolutionary theory and that dinosaurs were dragons. Dinosaur Adventure Land had displays about the existence of the Loch Ness Monster and Beowulf as history rather than legend.

=== Debates ===
Prior to his convictions, Hovind was a prolific debater. While Hovind campaigns against evolution, the level of support for evolution is essentially universal within the scientific community and academia; support for creationism is minimal among scientists in general, and virtually nonexistent among those in the following fields: biology, paleontology, geology, etc. C. A. Chinn and L. A. Buckland classify his debate style, common among Young Earth Creationists, as eristic: focused on winning by rhetoric rather than illuminating by careful examination of evidence.

In 1993, Hovind announced that he would debate the evolutionary biologist Stephen Jay Gould, who had a longstanding opposition to debating Creationists and had turned down numerous challenges. When contacted about the announcement, Gould said he had never heard of Hovind, much less agreed to debate.

In May 2004, Michael Shermer debated Hovind in front of a predominantly creationist audience. Shermer claimed the exchange was "not an intellectual exercise", but rather "an emotional drama", and concluded, "Unless there is a subject that is truly debatable with a format that is fair, in a forum that is balanced, it only serves to belittle both the magisterium of science and the magisterium of religion." Massimo Pigliucci also debated Hovind, and expressed surprise at Hovind's ignorance of evolutionary theory. Pigliucci recalled Hovind tried "to convince the audience that evolutionists believe humans came from rocks" and subsequently "evolved from bananas." William Reville, Director of Microscopy at University College Cork, wrote that Hovind's ideas are not rational or scientific because they are not testable. Hovind has repeatedly declined offers for written debates where his claims would be scrutinized by scientists, including his decline of a debate offer from Dave Thomas.

During a debate with Farrell Till, Hovind said that Donald Johanson had uncovered the leg bones of Lucy at a different site over a mile away from the reported site, in a deeper stratum, quipping, "I would like to know how fast the train was going that hit that chimpanzee." This was clearly contrary to the published statements by Johanson. After Hovind had been informed in 1993 that his statement was false, he agreed to stop using the claim. When he repeated the claim in 1995, he once more agreed he was in error.

=== $250,000 offer ===
In 1990, Hovind made a $10,000 offer to anyone who could meet a set of requirements he said would prove evolution, and he later raised the amount to $250,000. In 2007, Creation Science Evangelism removed the offer from its website.

I have a standing offer of $250,000 to anyone who can give any empirical evidence (scientific proof) for evolution.* My $250,000 offer demonstrates that the hypothesis of evolution is nothing more than a religious belief.

...

*NOTE: When I use the word evolution, I am not referring to the minor variations found in all of the various life forms (microevolution). I am referring to the general theory of evolution which believes these five major events took place without God:

1. Time, space, and matter came into existence by themselves.
2. Planets and stars formed from space dust.
3. Matter created life by itself.
4. Early life-forms learned to reproduce themselves.
5. Major changes occurred between these diverse life forms (i.e., fish changed to amphibians, amphibians changed to reptiles, and reptiles changed to birds or mammals).

The premises of Hovind's offer have been rejected both by scientists and fellow creationists as fundamentally flawed. Hovind's conditions would require a claimant not only to prove the theory of evolution, but also abiogenesis, astrophysics and cosmology, and additionally prove that no gods could possibly exist. The judges would be hand-picked without assurances that they would be unbiased or qualified to assess the merit of claims, and it is possible that no panel was convened when a claim was submitted. Some forms of evidence would be excluded prior to judging.

Answers in Genesis dismissed the challenge as a gimmick. A 2005 challenge on Boing Boing offered $250,000 to anyone who could prove that the Flying Spaghetti Monster (the deity of a parody religion constructed to make a point about giving time to alternative views on evolution) was not the father of Jesus.

=== Political activity ===
In 1999, a Bradenton, Florida pastor asked the school board to consider adding Creationism to the curriculum. The school board chairman's actions raised issues when, in his capacity as a citizen, he helped fund a series of seminars by Hovind, but he was within ethical guidelines. More controversy was raised when a school employee was sent to videotape the lectures, although without intention for rebroadcast. Ultimately, there was no curriculum change.

Hovind was criticized for his involvement with Arkansas state Representative Jim Holt's Anti-Evolution Bill in 2001 (House Bill 2548). This bill "would have required that when public schools refer to evolution that it be identified as an unproven theory." Opponents of the bill worried that it would subject Arkansas to the same type of derision that occurred when the state's balanced-treatment law was struck down in McLean v. Arkansas. Holt called upon Hovind as an expert who "testified for Holt before the State Agencies and Governmental Affairs Committee, alleging much of the information pertaining to evolution in our science textbooks is false."

In 2007, David Vitter added a $100,000 earmark in a U.S. Senate appropriations bill, directed towards the Louisiana Family Forum "to develop a plan to promote better science education". Their website included a document, "'A Battle Plan—Practical Steps to Combat Evolution' by Kent Hovind". After a reporter's inquiries, the document, which called evolution "not a harmless theory but a dangerous religious belief" and blamed it for atrocities by Adolf Hitler, Joseph Stalin, and Pol Pot, was removed from their website. The earmark was withdrawn from the bill.

=== Chick tracts ===
The most widely distributed antievolution work, Big Daddy?, was first published in 1972 (Note: There may also be a 1970 version.) and revised several times; it is one of the controversial Chick tracts, comic strips intended to convert people to fundamentalist Christianity. Material from Hovind was incorporated into the 2000 revision.

=== Miscellaneous ===
Hovind believes that the King James Version is the most accurate English-language Bible translation.

== Politics and conspiracy theories ==
Hovind has made controversial remarks regarding conspiracies, science, creation, equal rights, religion, and government. His presentations on creationism and evolution are a mix of Christian Fundamentalism and conspiracy theories. His creationist presentations have asserted that creationism is not taught in public schools due to a New World Order conspiracy, established by Satan and involving Ted Turner and Jane Fonda, the British royal family, the State of Israel, the American Civil Liberties Union (which he calls "the American Communist Lawyers Union"), U.S. government officials, business leaders, and social activists. In May 1999, he claimed "the implementation of the NWO's world-domination plan was May 5, 2000."

Hovind has promoted several conspiracy theories about the U.S. government. He has claimed that the U.S. government was behind the 9/11 attacks and the Oklahoma City bombing. Regarding UFOs, Hovind recommends books by conspiracy theorists who believe "some UFO's are U.S. Government experiments with electrogravitic propulsion as opposed to jet propulsion, while others are Satanic apparitions." The Southern Poverty Law Center (SPLC) criticized Hovind for referring followers to books by Irwin Schiff, a tax protester who has been convicted of tax evasion multiple times. The SPLC has criticized Hovind for "point[ing] his followers to Citizens Rule Book, popular among antigovernment 'Patriots', and to Media Bypass, an antigovernment magazine with strong antisemitic leanings", and for selling of books such as Des Griffin's Fourth Reich of the Rich and Peter Kershaw's In Caesar's Grip, and recommending The Protocols of the Elders of Zion, a well-known antisemitic hoax.

Hovind claims that the cyanide-releasing compound laetrile is a "cancer cure" which the U.S. government is conspiring to suppress and that diseases including HIV, Gulf war syndrome, Crohn's colitis, and rheumatoid arthritis and Alzheimer's were engineered by "the money masters and governments of the world" for the purpose of global economic domination. He has denounced democracy as "evil and contrary to God's law", and called global warming a communist conspiracy.

In his lectures, he claimed that the United States government was implanting pet-tracking microchips into people allowing them to be tracked by satellite, even though the transponder range made that impossible. On his website, Hovind associated the UPC bar code with the Mark of the Beast, and wrote that there were reports of people paying for groceries by having their hands scanned in 1999.

== YouTube copyright controversy ==
Kent Hovind/Creation Science Evangelism copyright policy prior to September 2007

On September 16, 2007, the Rational Response Squad (RRS) complained that Creation Science Evangelism was filing spurious DMCA requests that had caused RRS YouTube videos to be taken down and the RRS YouTube account to be banned. In response to the copyright claims, the RRS threatened a lawsuit.

At the time of the complaints, the CSE's website indicated the videos were not copyrighted, and the CSE encouraged copying and distributing them. Five days later, the CSE copyright page was changed to say that copied material must be left unedited. According to a spokesperson for the Electronic Frontier Foundation, CSE's claim was "clearly bogus", and as of September 25, 2007, the Rational Response Squad account had been reinstated, and some of the videos had been put back online.

== Legal issues ==
=== Escambia County (2002–2006) ===
On August 15, 2002, Hovind was arrested for assault, battery, and burglary in an incident with a CSE secretary. The charges were dropped in December.

On September 13, 2002, Hovind was charged with failure to observe county zoning regulations for Dinosaur Adventure Land, a misdemeanor. In April 2006, the Dinosaur Adventure Land buildings were closed by county officials, and the Florida circuit court found the owners in contempt, ordering fines of $500 for each day the buildings were used. Hovind argued he did not need a permit due to the nature of the building, but after a 5-year court battle over the $50 building permit, on June 5, 2006, Hovind pleaded nolo contendere as charged to three counts: constructing a building without a permit, refusing to sign a citation, and violating the county building code. Hovind paid fines totaling $675.

=== Federal civil tax matters, bankruptcy, and renouncing citizenship (1996–2006) ===
Hovind was originally reported to the Internal Revenue Service by Pensacola Christian College senior vice President Rebekah Horton in the mid-1990s, after she learned of Hovind's anti-tax stand. Hovind's organization had neither business licenses nor tax-exempt status, nor was it considered a church by people who worked there. The ministry's organizational structure was described by the United States Tax Court as appearing to be "based on various questionable trust documents purchased from Glen Stoll, a known promoter of tax avoidance schemes", leading the Court to conclude that Hovind used these trust documents as well as other fraudulent means to conceal the ownership and control of his activities and properties.

According to the IRS, Hovind earned $50,000 a year through speaking engagements, (Note: In 2004, Hovind told The New York Times that he had 700 speaking engagements per year.) and in 2002 alone, CSE sold more than $1.8 million in merchandise. On average, Hovind made bank deposits in excess of $1 million each year, and eventually that grew to about $2 million a year. About half that income went to employees who were salaried or were paid hourly wages. However, Hovind derived "substantial revenue" from these activities that appeared to be "income to [him] personally".

On March 1, 1996, Hovind filed a Chapter 13 bankruptcy petition to avoid paying federal income taxes, claiming he was not a citizen of the United States and that he did not earn income. He claimed that as a minister, everything he owned belonged to God and he was not subject to paying taxes for doing God's work. On June 5, 1996, the Court dismissed Hovind's bankruptcy case, finding he had lied about his possessions and income. The court upheld the IRS's determination that his claim "was filed in bad faith for the sole purpose of avoiding payment of federal income taxes" and called Hovind's arguments "patently absurd". It also said that "the IRS has no record of the debtor ever having filed a federal income tax return."

In 1998, the IRS requested account information about Hovind from an internet provider after Hovind made claims on an internet broadcast about his own tax law noncompliance, going back to the 1970s. When the provider initially balked, the courts granted a subpoena on the basis that the IRS could demonstrate that Hovind had received income but had filed no income tax returns going back to 1991. In 2003, Hovind would tell The New York Times, "I haven't filed a tax return in 30 years."

On May 13, 1998, Hovind and his wife filed a "Power of Attorney and Revocation of Signature" document in Escambia County which would nullify any of their promises, debts, or legal agreements made prior to April 15, 1998. The Hovinds claimed they had signed government documents "due to the use of various elements of fraud and misrepresentations, duress, coercion, under perjury, mistake, 'bankruptcy'," and argued that Social Security is a "Ponzi scheme". The document referred to the United States Government as "the 'bankrupt' corporate government", renounced the Hovinds' United States citizenship and Social Security numbers to become "a natural citizen of 'America' and a natural sojourner", and referred to their home state of Florida as "the State of Florida Body-Politic Corporation." Judges and the IRS did not appear to honor this as a legally relevant document in future decisions. In 2002, Hovind was again delinquent in paying his taxes, and unsuccessfully sued the IRS for harassment.

At various times, the government alleged that Hovind had not filed personal U.S. federal income tax returns for the years 1989 through 1997. In the spring of 2004, the IRS conducted an audit and criminal investigation regarding Hovind's unfiled personal Federal income tax for 1995 through 1997. IRS agent Scott Schneider said, "Since 1997, Hovind has engaged in financial transactions indicating sources of income and has made deposits to bank accounts well in excess of $1 million per year during some of these years, which would require the filing of federal income taxes." On June 3, 2004, the IRS executed a search warrant on Hovind's home and businesses to confiscate financial records and attempt to deliver notices of Federal tax liens of $504,957.24, which Hovind refused to accept. Agents confiscated $42,000 in cash found in various places in the residence. Six guns were present, including an SKS semiautomatic rifle. That day, Hovind withdrew $70,000 from the CSE bank account, half in cash.

On July 7, 2006, the United States Tax Court found that Hovind was deficient in paying his federal income taxes in 1995–1997, totaling $520,099. The Tax Court ruled that the IRS had a valid lien on Hovind's property and said that Hovind's defense was based on "bizarre arguments, some of which constitute tax protester arguments involving excise taxes and the alleged '100% voluntary' nature of the income tax." With penalties, he owed $3.3 million for tax years 1998–2006 by 2013. Jo Hovind was ordered to pay $1.6 million.

=== Federal criminal tax-related trial and convictions in 2006 ===
On July 11, 2006, Hovind was indicted on 58 counts in the District Court in Northern Florida in Pensacola. The first 12 counts were charges for willful failure to collect, account for, and pay federal income taxes and FICA taxes in connection with the CSE operation, totaling $473,818 for the 12 fiscal quarters of 2001–2003. The next 45 counts were charges for knowingly structuring transactions by making multiple cash withdrawals totaling $430,500 in amounts just under the $10,000 threshold which requires reporting (a technique known as "structuring"), for which his wife was also charged. The last count was a charge of corruptly endeavoring to obstruct and impede the administration of the internal revenue laws by falsely listing the IRS as his only creditor when filing for bankruptcy, filing a false and frivolous lawsuit against the IRS in which he demanded damages for criminal trespass, making threats of harm to those investigating him and to those who might consider cooperating with the investigation, filing a false complaint against IRS agents investigating him, filing a false criminal complaint against IRS special agents (criminal investigators), and destroying records. Because of reports of weapons on the Hovind property, the indictment was originally sealed for fear of danger to the arresting agents.

At arraignment, Hovind claimed incomprehension to the charges, telling the court: "I still don't understand what I'm being charged for and who is charging me." The presiding magistrate judge asked Hovind if he wrote and spoke English, to which Hovind responded, "To some degree." The judge replied that the government adequately explained the allegations and the defendant understands the charges, "whether you want to admit it or not." Hovind stated that he did not recognize the government's right to try him on tax-fraud charges. At first he attempted to enter a plea of "subornation of false muster," but then entered a not guilty plea "under duress" when the judge offered to enter a plea for him. When asked about his home, Hovind called it a "church parish", and denied any residence except the "church of Jesus Christ", worldwide. Hovind's passport and guns were seized. Hovind protested, arguing that he needed his passport to continue his evangelism work, and that "thousands and thousands" were waiting to hear him preach in South Africa the following month. The court refused to reconsider, accepting the argument that "like-minded people" might secret Hovind away if he left the country.

The trial began on October 21, 2006. Hovind hoped to convince a jury that his amusement park admission and merchandise sales, over $5 million from 1999 through March 2004, belonged to God and could not be taxed. Evidence produced at the trial revealed that Jo Hovind had requested financial assistance from Baptist Healthcare by claiming that the Hovinds had no income. IRS agents told the court how Hovind had attempted "bullying tactics" and had sued the government three times to pressure them to stop investigating. The lawsuits had been thrown out. The prosecution countered attempts to describe workers as missionaries, ministers, and volunteers, introducing memos in which they had been called employees. Workers testified that they had to punch time cards, had vacation and sick days, and did not receive W-2 tax forms. After the IRS executed the search warrant, employees were required to sign non-disclosure agreements to remain employed. A lawyer who did work for a non-profit Christian organization testified that Hovind claimed to have "beat" the tax system and that he favored cash transactions because they were untraceable and, consequently, untaxable.

Hovind's lawyer engaged in a lengthy cross-examination of the lead IRS investigator, and the case ended on November 1 with the defense calling no witnesses. After closing arguments were presented on November 2, the jury deliberated three hours before finding the Hovinds guilty on all counts, 58 for Hovind and 45 for his wife. The Pensacola News Journal said, "The saddest thing: had they cooperated with the agents, they probably wouldn't be worrying about prison sentences now."

=== Sentencing, appeals, and imprisonment (2007–2019) ===
After the convictions and pending sentencing, Hovind was incarcerated in the Escambia County Jail as a "danger to the community" and a flight risk. His wife would remain free until after the appeal.

On January 19, 2007, Hovind was sentenced to ten years in prison with three years' probation and ordered to pay the federal government restitution of over $600,000. During the sentencing phase, a tearful Hovind, hoping to avoid prison, told the court, "If it's just money the IRS wants, there are thousands of people out there who will help pay the money they want so I can go back out there and preach." However, Hovind's court room behavior was in stark contrast to phone calls he made while in jail and played by the prosecution. The tapes, posted online by the Pensacola News Journal, included one conversation with Hovind and son Eric, who were planning to hide a motor vehicle title and property deeds to prevent the government from collecting the property to pay for owed debt. At sentencing, he denied being a "tax protester", but the prosecution, an IRS spokesman, and the Pensacola News Journal used that term to describe him.

On June 29, 2007, Jo Hovind was sentenced to one year of imprisonment, three years of supervision upon release, and fined $8,000. In court, Jo Hovind offered explanations for the 45 checks just under $10,000 and for checks cashed before and after the reporting deadline, telling the judge "I really did not have a leadership role in CSE," and finished, "I would never knowingly do anything illegal." The judge said that while Hovind was the principal authority at CSE, Jo managed the payroll; she had cashed roughly 200 checks totaling $1.5 million over a four-year period, relying on cash to avoid IRS scrutiny. The United States Court of Appeals for the Eleventh Circuit denied both appeals on December 30, 2008, and the U.S. Supreme Court denied certiorari on November 2, 2009.

Hovind appealed the amount of his 2006 U.S. Tax Court ruling on personal income taxes to the United States Court of Appeals for the Eleventh Circuit, but on July 2, 2007, a three-judge panel denied the appeal, finding that Hovind had failed to raise the issue at the appropriate time.

In November 2010, Hovind filed a motion in U.S. District Court Northern District of Florida claiming the prosecution and defense erred at various stages of the case; it was denied the following May. It was one of at least six motions to dismiss he filed that year on various procedural or constitutional grounds.

In July 2015, Hovind was released to home confinement for roughly one month to finish his prison sentence for his 2006 conviction. Almost a year after his release, Hovind said he would continue to fight his conviction and the property seizure.

In October 2019, Hovind filed a motion to vacate in the trial court without obtaining the required certification from the appellate court; the motion was dismissed, summarily.

=== CSE property forfeitures ===
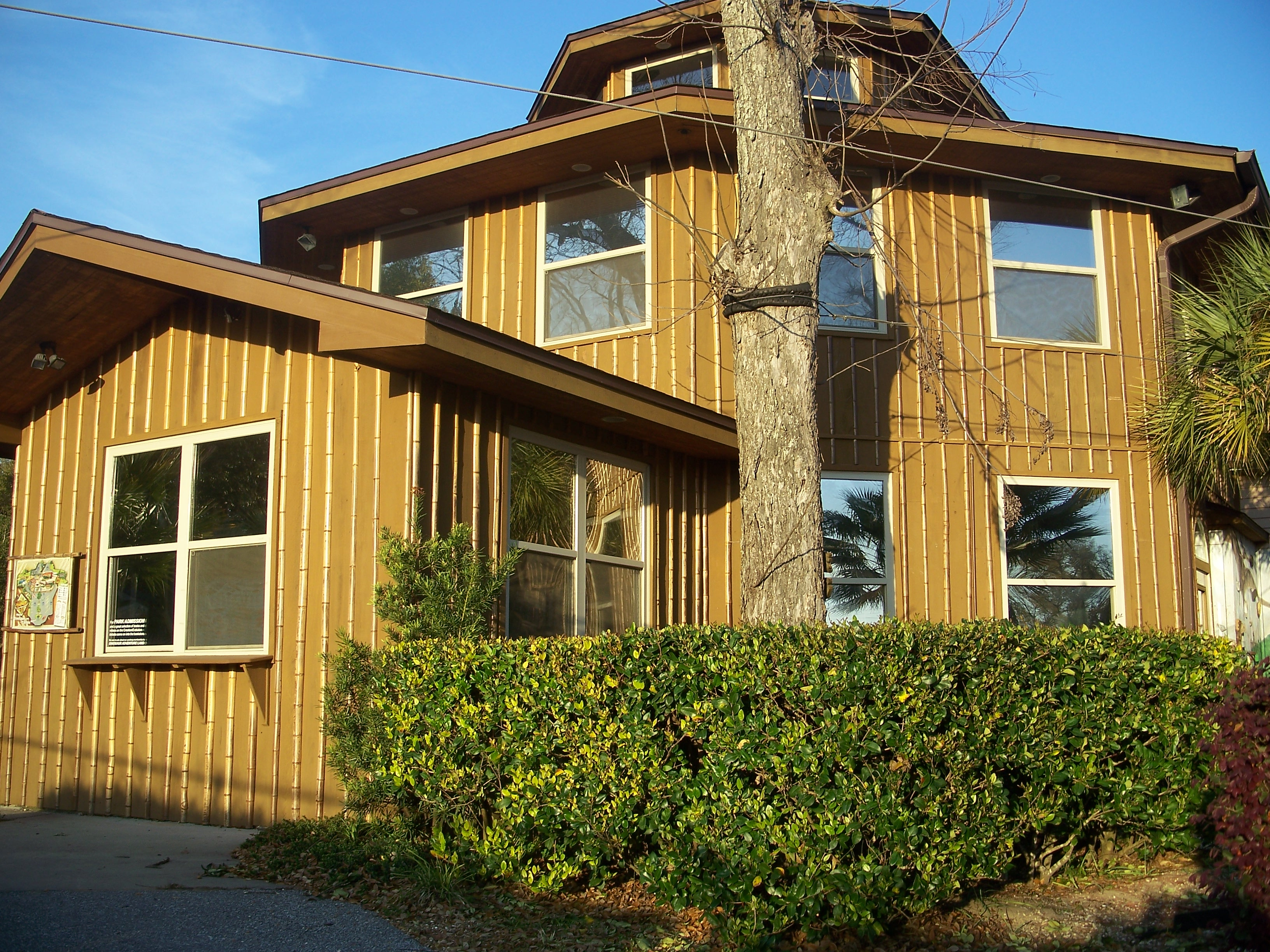
Property on Dinosaur Adventure Land

In 2007, the government placed liens on ten of the Hovinds' properties for money owed following a June 27, 2007, judgment, which included an order that the properties be forfeited under 18 U.S.C. § 3613 for costs of $5,800, a fine of $2000, and restitution of $604,874.87. On December 30, 2008, the United States Court of Appeals for the Eleventh Circuit denied the Hovinds' appeal and affirmed the convictions and sentences entered by the district court. Following the appeal, Jo Hovind served her prison term from January 20, 2009, to December 3, 2009.

In 2008, Eric Hovind and Glen Stoll, an individual who has been associated with the Embassy of Heaven organization and who has falsely claimed to be a lawyer, attempted to prevent the forfeitures of Hovind's ten properties, including Dinosaur Adventure Land, in connection with the federal tax problems. In early 2019, Stoll himself was indicted by a Federal grand jury in Portland, Oregon on unrelated charges of conspiracy to defraud the United States, bank fraud, conspiracy to commit bank fraud, making a false statement on a loan application, and tax evasion. The government sought the property, deeded to Stoll and Eric prior to Hovind's convictions, since cash had been withdrawn from the bank accounts and could not be recovered. In a court filing, however, Eric Hovind said that he owned one of the properties and that he "took active control over the lot by personally building a home on it with $70,000 he borrowed from CSE." The court accepted Eric's ownership of that property, but allowed the government to seize the other nine properties. The court ruling denying the Hovinds' appeal cleared the way for forfeiture proceedings on Hovind-owned properties, including those on which Dinosaur Adventure Land sat, to continue to satisfy the debt.

In March 2012, the federal government sued Creation Science Evangelism to remove liens placed on Hovind's former property that was seized after his conviction, and in June, the court ruled in favor of the government.

In May 2013, facing the sale of lots that were once part of Dinosaur Adventure land, Hovind acted. Using legal advice from another inmate, he filed a civil right suit against corrections personnel (a "Bivens action") alleging that they intentionally delayed court documents which hindered another appeal. Based on the assumption that it would trigger a chain of rulings that would ultimately result in the original sentence being overturned, he then filed several lis pendens on the properties. A federal judge rejected Hovind's claims and dismissed the filings ("void ab initio"), and asked for a "show of cause" from Hovind to explain why he should not be found in contempt of court for the false filings. His release date was approaching when he would face new charges related to the lis pendens filings.

=== Federal mail fraud and criminal contempt trial in 2015 ===
On October 21, 2014, Hovind was indicted by a federal grand jury in Pensacola, Florida, on two counts of mail fraud, one count of conspiracy with Paul John Hansen to commit mail fraud, and one count of criminal contempt for interfering with the sale of Pensacola properties Hovind was forced to forfeit as a result of the 2006 case. Hovind and Hansen pleaded not guilty and were tried together.

On March 2, 2015, the trial began in U.S. District Court for Northern Florida. On the first day of testimony, the prosecution discussed Hovind and Hansen's "dozens of filings", including several lis pendens, used to resist a court-ordered forfeiture due in part to legal advice Hovind took from his "cellmate in a New Hampshire prison camp". The prosecution case included numerous emails, recorded phone calls, and court filings related to the forfeited properties. The prosecution presented audio of Hovind characterizing a lis pendens by asking his daughter, "Have you ever taken a step into dog crap and it gets stuck on your feet and it's really hard to get off?" Hansen and Hovind took the stand in their own defense. According to journalist Kevin Robinson, during Hovind's testimony, he "refused to give short answers" and said that he believed his actions were lawful. On March 12, 2015, Hovind was found guilty on one count of criminal contempt, Hansen on two counts of criminal contempt, and the jury was hung on the remaining charges.

A trial on the counts on which the jury could not reach a verdict had been ordered to begin on May 18, 2015. However, on May 16, 2015, the prosecution filed its "Government's Motion to Dismiss Counts One, Two and Four of the Superseding Indictment Without Prejudice," citing "issues regarding the technical sufficiency of the Superseding Indictment, including the adequacy of notice." Later, on May 16, the Court cancelled the jury selection and trial that had been scheduled to begin on Monday, May 18, in order, in the Court's words, to permit the defendants to respond to the government's motion.

On Monday, May 18, 2015, the U.S. District Court made two decisions. First, the Court granted the prosecutor's request for a "without prejudice" dismissal of the three remaining charges against Hovind, allowing the prosecutor to go back to a Federal grand jury and seek a new indictment if desired. Second, the Court rendered a judgment of acquittal on the criminal contempt charge on which Hovind had been found guilty by the jury. On that point, the Court concluded that in the specific order that Hovind had been found guilty of violating, there was no actual language that prohibited Hovind from doing anything.

On August 21, 2015, Paul John Hansen was sentenced to 18 months in prison and three years' probation for the two counts of contempt.

=== Domestic violence ===
Hovind was arrested in Alabama on July 30, 2021, for allegedly throwing his estranged wife, Cindi Lincoln, to the ground in October 2020. Additionally, she petitioned for a protective order in Conecuh County, Alabama, saying that she had to go to the emergency room after being "bodyslammed". She has also stated that she had been threatened by one of Hovind's associates. At a bench trial in the Connecuh County Courthouse on September 20, 2021, he was found guilty of domestic violence. He was sentenced to one year in jail which would be suspended following 30 days in the county jail to start by October 18, fined $500, and ordered to pay restitution for medical expenses. A request for a retrial was denied, and an appeal requesting a jury trial was filed in the Alabama Circuit Courts.

== See also ==
- Tax protester history in the United States
