= World's Largest Horseshoe Crab =

Fiberglass roadside sculpture in Lenox, Alabama, United States

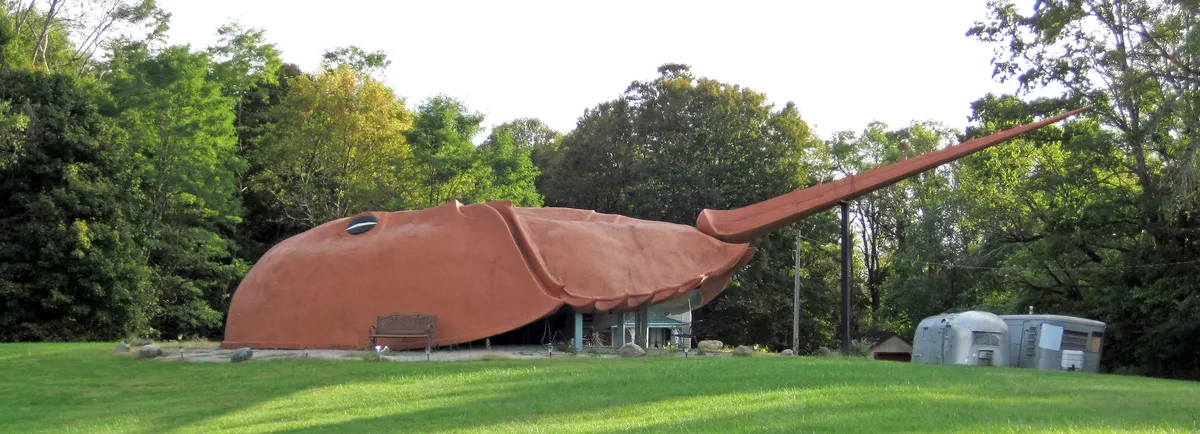
The World's Largest Horseshoe Crab

The World's Largest Horseshoe Crab is a fiberglass and foam roadside sculpture located along Coneca 7 near Lenox, Alabama, United States. Nicknamed "Crabbie", the piece measures roughly 67–68 feet (20–21 m) in length, about 28–33 feet (8.5–10.1 m) in width, and approximately 10–12 feet (3.0–3.7 m) in height.

== History ==
The sculpture was built in the 1990s for a maritime display in Baltimore's Inner Harbor and later acquired by the Creation Museum in Kentucky. It was subsequently installed outside a church in Blanchester, Ohio, before being purchased in 2015 and moved to a private property near Hillsboro for public viewing. It has since been donated to Dinosaur Adventure Land and is now residing in Lenox, Alabama.

== Description and access ==
The hollow structure is accessible as a roadside attraction and has periodically been repainted. It has been used informally for small gatherings and photo opportunities.
