= Fully Informed Jury Association =

American juror education group

- Abbreviation: FIJA
- Formation: 1989
- Type: Membership organization
- Purpose: Juror education
- Headquarters: Helena, Montana
- Region served: United States
- Executive Director: William Gillis
- Main organ: Board of Directors
- Budget: $140,000 annually
- Staff: 3
- Website: fija.org

The Fully Informed Jury Association (FIJA) is a United States national jury education organization, incorporated in the state of Montana as a 501(c)(3) not-for-profit organization. It works to educate citizens on their authority when they serve as jurors. FIJA's stated aims are to educate the public, provide commentary on current jury-related cases, and assist defendants with jury authority strategies — including the right to veto bad laws and the misapplication of laws by refusing to convict the defendant. The organization was formed in 1989 by Larry Dodge, a Montana businessman, and his friend Don Doig. It was formed following discussions about forming such a group at the National Libertarian Party convention in Philadelphia in 1989.

In the U.S., every defendant in a criminal case has the right, under Article III, Section 2 and the Sixth Amendment to the U.S. Constitution, to be tried by an impartial jury. If the defendant is acquitted, the Double Jeopardy Clause of the Fifth Amendment forbids the government from putting him or her on trial again. FIJA advises jurors to vote for acquittal if they disagree with the law – a concept known as jury nullification – even if they believe the defendant committed the crime for which he or she is charged.

== Activism ==
FIJA has lobbied state legislatures to enact legislation that would explicitly elevate the jury's formerly unspoken power to nullify to an openly acknowledged right. On June 18, 2012, New Hampshire passed a law explicitly allowing defense attorneys to inform juries about jury nullification. FIJA has also proposed abolishing the juror's oath. FIJA has also launched a "Challenge for Churches" program of jury seminars, focusing on "serving justice through conscience". FIJA has also launched a "Lunch Break for Liberty" program to encourage people to use their lunch break to hand out FIJA pamphlets.

FIJA activists have demonstrated outside courthouses and handed out literature to potential jurors in hundreds of cases. They have generally not been arrested for doing so. FIJA speculates that this may be because "prosecutors have reasoned (correctly) that if they arrest fully informed jury leafleters, the leaflets will have to be given to the leafleter's own jury as evidence". FIJA and its activists have been involved in litigation over these matters. Another argument is that since FIJA literature is generic, making no reference to any cases potential jurors may be called upon to serve on, its distribution is not jury tampering.

In dismissing an activist's lawsuit for false arrest for disorderly conduct, the U.S. Court of Appeals for the Seventh Circuit stated, "Although advocacy of jury nullification could no more be flatly forbidden than advocacy of Marxism, nudism, or Satanism, we cannot think of a more reasonable regulation of the time, place, and manner of speech than to forbid its advocacy in a courthouse."

== Members ==
Past members include Libertarian Party politician, Mike Fellows. A board member was Robert Anton Wilson.

== Opposition ==
Some prosecutors and law enforcement professionals are strongly opposed to the notion that juries can nullify undesirable laws. In 2008, Clay Conrad, author of Jury Nullification: The Evolution of a Doctrine, quit the organization, stating that it was "so centered on jury nullification that it was ignoring the numerous threats that exist to the jury as an institution," as evidenced by the fact that the percentage of cases going to jury trial is continually shrinking. Executive Director Iloilo M. Jones described his parting comments as sour grapes motivated by his disappointment at not being able to shift FIJA's focus toward preparing attorneys to pursue jury nullification. Conrad rebutted that the organization needed to teach the importance of the jury system as a whole, not merely the nullification doctrine. FIJA has been condemned as a threat to the system of rule of law rather than rule of men. According to Erick J. Haynie, "it is highly questionable whether jurors should be instructed to 'make' the law when a legislative body has already done the job for them. Congress and the state legislatures have superior expertise, resources and perspective to make macro-social decisions, and much more time to reach a well-reasoned decision than does 'a group of twelve citizens of no particular distinction snatched away from their primary vocations' to spend a couple of days in court.'"

== Cases ==
=== Jerry Begly ===
In 2001, Jerry Begly was dismissed from the jury pool after a bailiff noticed he was passing out copies of the Citizens Rule Book, a jury rights publication. The bailiff confiscated the booklets from the recipients and Begly was charged with contempt of court. The judge dropped the charges "in the interest of judicial economy".

=== Frank W. Turney ===
In Turney v. State of Alaska, FIJA advocate Frank W. Turney was indicted by a grand jury for jury tampering and criminal trespass, and on interlocutory appeal, the Supreme Court of Alaska allowed the indictment to stand. While a felon in possession of a firearm case was underway, Turney allegedly told a juror, who was wearing a button identifying him as such, to call FIJA's telephone number and learn about his rights. According to court records:

During deliberations the next day, Juror Ellis told other jurors that he had called the number, and that he was changing his vote. He told them that "I can vote what I want." He also told them that they should call the number ... The jury announced the next morning that it could not reach a decision, and was excused. Jury Foreman Romersberger testified that two jurors had changed their votes to "not guilty" after speaking with Turney or calling the number, leaving the jury deadlocked at eight "guilty" votes to four "not guilty" votes. He testified that the jurors who had switched stated that "their conscience was greatly relieved, and they were going to vote their conscience".

After the verdict, Turney called in to a radio talk show to express his opinion that Hall should not have been prosecuted for possessing a concealable firearm since Hall previously had been convicted only of a non-violent felony. Turney's writ of habeas corpus was denied by the U.S. Court of Appeals for the Ninth Circuit.

=== Julian Heicklen ===
Julian Heicklen has been arrested multiple times by U.S. Department of Homeland Security federal police officers while distributing FIJA literature at the United States District Court for the Southern District of New York.

On May 25, 2010, Julian Heicklen was arrested after refusing to stop handing out pamphlets at a U.S. District Courthouse in New York City, and was indicted for jury tampering. Because of previous failures to appear in court, he was remanded to Riker's Island until his June 8 arraignment. His arrest gained national attention over the following year due to the First Amendment implications of arresting a citizen for handing out educational pamphlets about jury nullification to prospective jurors outside of a courthouse.

Heicklen has been arrested or fined multiple times related to distributing pamphlets on nullificiation. Heicken wrote that during one arrest he chose to fall to the ground limp and silent; an ambulance was called and he signed his hospital release form as "John Galt".

Another activist was arrested for filming on federal property without permission while recording Heicklen's November 9, 2009 arrest. Fellow nullification activists held a protest in his defense.

On April 19, 2012, District Court Judge Kimba Wood granted Heicklen's Motion to Dismiss the Indictment as legally deficient.

=== Douglas Bruce ===
In June 2000, Douglas Bruce was called to appear as a potential juror for a sexual assault trial in Colorado Springs, CO. During the jury selection process, Bruce distributed leaflets written by the Fully Informed Jury Association in support of jury nullification. After defense attorneys objected to Bruce's actions, the presiding judge dismissed Bruce and 50 other potential jurors who had received the fliers, resulting in a two-week delay for the trial.

=== Other ===
A 26-year-old man was acquitted on obstruction of justice charges stemming from his distribution of FIJA literature at the Perry County, Pennsylvania courthouse in 1994. In 1996, a 53-year-old man was arrested for passing out FIJA pamphlets to prospective jurors at the Clark County, Nevada courthouse. In 1995, a 51-year-old mother was charged with jury tampering for papering the windshields of cars near the federal courthouse with FIJA literature when her son was on trial and facing a heavy mandatory minimum sentence for drug offenses. In 2014, a candidate running for office in Greene County, Illinois was charged with jury tampering two weeks before his primary election for allegedly communicating with and providing a link to the FIJA website to another local office holder via a public Facebook post after that public figure posted that he had been summoned for jury duty.
