= Midwestern Baptist College =

Small unaccredited, nonaffiliated school in Orion, Michigan

Coordinates: 42°42′44.0″N 83°18′33.4″W

- Type: Liberal arts college, not accredited
- Established: 1953
- President: David M. Carr
- Dean: Joseph Fortna
- Students: 60
- Location: Orion, Michigan, United States
- Mascot: Falcons
- Website: http://www.midwesternbaptistcollege.net

Midwestern Baptist College, is an independent Baptist college in Orion, Michigan.

== History ==
In 1953, the school was founded in Pontiac, Michigan by Tom Malone Sr. as a liberal arts college, which included a Baptist seminary on more than 55 acres (220,000 m^{2}). It specializes in Christian theological doctrine. Malone wanted to offer a faith-based education including both academics and morals. The college also stressed being a moral compass, to "abstain from all appearances of evil", and fulfilling the Great Commission.

For the fall semester of 2010, Midwestern planned to move from Pontiac, Michigan to the property of Shalom Baptist Church in Orion Township, Michigan.

== Education ==
Midwestern Baptist College is not accredited by any accreditation body recognized by its country. According to the US Department of Education, unaccredited degrees and credits might not be acceptable to employers or other institutions, and use of degree titles may be restricted or illegal in some jurisdictions.

The highest degree the college awards is the Bachelor of Religious Education (B.R.E.) or Bachelor of Sacred Music (B.S.M.). The school also offers associate degree in Music, Commercial Subjects, and Biblical Studies.

== Alumni ==
- Chuck Baldwin, attended for two years, but did not graduate. Baldwin was the presidential nominee of the Constitution Party for the 2008 U.S. Presidential election.
- Kent Hovind, an apologist, young-earth creationist, and convicted tax protester, earned a Bachelor of Religious Education in 1974.
- Gary Click, a politician.

== See also ==
- List of unaccredited institutions of higher learning
- School accreditation
