= Larry Dodge =

American businessman and activist (1942–2012)

- Born: Lawrence Burnham Dodge; December 20, 1942; Oakland, California, U.S.
- Died: July 17, 2012 (aged 69); Dallas, Texas, U.S.
- Occupations: Activist, politician, professor of sociology
- Spouse: Honey Lanham

Lawrence Burnham Dodge (December 20, 1942 – July 17, 2012) was an American businessman and activist, who served as Chair of the Montana Libertarian Party.

== Early life ==
Dodge was born in Oakland, California. Dodge had worked as a professional photographer for some time in his career. Prior to his political involvement in politics, he trained in sociology. He gained a Ph.D. from Brown University. Also he was a professor at the State University of New York at Plattsburgh. He was also professor at the University of Montana.

== Personal life ==
In 1990, he married long-time LP activist Honey Lanham who was from Texas.

== Activism ==
The Washington Post described Dodge as a Montana sociology professor turned libertarian activist. Along with Don Doig he has been referred to as an old warrior who had made a career out of fighting big government. He appeared at and participated in various Libertarian conferences. In the 1980s he was at one of the Libertarian National Conventions in which he opened with a keynote on libertarian successes and credibility. He also spoke at the Eris 1999 Conference held in Aspen, Colorado.

One of the issues he had an interest in was gun ownership. In 2002 he wrote an article for Gun Owners of America called "In Op-ed Pieces". It was about gun control laws, the loss of liberties and the government not being the least bit interested in honoring the Bill of Rights.

=== Fully Informed Jury Association ===
Along with Don Doig, Dodge was the founder of the non-profit group Fully Informed Jury Association in Montana. The organization was set up to inform Americans about their rights as jurors as well as personal liberties.

== Political ==
Dodge was the best known leader of the Montana Libertarian Party. He tried three times for statewide office. In 1982 Dodge campaigned for the senate seat that was held by democrat John Melcher and Republican Larry Williams. He got 4 percent of the vote. In an article in the Spokesman-Review Oct 20, 1982, he said that Melcher was being bankrolled by special interest groups and that Republican Williams was using polls to pick out the most popular issues to aid his image. In 1987, Dodge tried to promote Russell Means for the Libertarian candidacy in the 1988 race.

== Relocation to Panama ==
In 2004, after considering different locations around the world, they decided to move to Panama. They settled on the mountain town of Altos del María there. They had visited the area a couple of years previously to check it out. Part of the reason they moved there was due to Dodge's health issues and the fact that healthcare was beyond their means. In an article in The New York Times she drew a comparison between her husband's medical treatment costing $52,000 in the US and in Panama costing $11,000. Low land prices and Panama's laissez-faire stance on private property rights and entrepreneurship were also a feature. Another reason given for their move to Panama was the personal freedoms they felt Panama offered them. They felt those freedoms were being rapidly eroded in the U.S.

== Death ==
In April 2012 he was in a Panama hospital having suffered from what appeared to have been an aneurysm. He had been with his wife when he collapsed and she had got him to hospital. He died on July 17, 2012, aged 69. A memorial was held for him on 18 August.
