= Citizens Rule Book =

The cover of The Citizens Rule Book

Citizens Rule Book is a handbook written to educate American citizens regarding their rights and responsibilities. It is a compilation of quotes from founders of the United States of America and select government documents, including information on the rights of a jury to "nullify bad law" and acquit people on trial. The author of the Rule Book says that jurors have the right to nullify a trial if the law is unconstitutional or is being used in an unconstitutional manner. Originally published anonymously, the Citizens Rule Book is now known to have been written by Charles R. Olsen, a World War II Marine veteran and printer from Boston. It is distributed by the Fully Informed Jury Association, among other groups.

== Contents ==
The Citizens Rule Book is divided into three sections. The first section deals with the rights of juries, the second section discusses the views of American founders regarding jury trials, and the third section summarizes important founding documents of the United States.

=== Section 1: A Handbook for Jurors ===
The Citizens Rule Book claims that citizens are "above the law" and may nullify any law which is unconstitutional. It says that a citizen's power comes directly from God, therefore jurors are not beholden to decisions made by judges or other government agents. According to the book, "each JUROR has MORE POWER than the President, all of Congress, and all of the judges combined!"

By issuing a verdict of "not guilty", even against the wishes of all other jurors, a single juror may "hang" a trial, resulting in a mistrial. The Rule Book advocates the use of this tactic to overturn cases in which a person is guilty of a crime, but the law in question is unconstitutional.

This section also says that the United States Constitution and Bill of Rights are based on the Biblical Ten Commandments. In contrast, "many of the planks of the Communist Manifesto are now represented by law in the U.S."

=== Section 2: Give Me Liberty or Give Me Death! ===
In this section, the Citizens Rule Book says that the founders of the United States believed all juries should be composed of people who personally know the accused. It quotes Patrick Henry, Representative John Holmes, and Declaration of Independence signatory James Wilson to the effect that jurors should be familiar with the "character" of the defendant on trial.

=== Section 3: Index to the Original Documents ===
In this section, the Citizens Rule Book provides summaries and commentaries on three important founding documents of the United States: the Declaration of Independence, the Constitution, and the Bill of Rights.

== Distribution ==
The printers claim that over three million copies of the Citizens Rule Book have been published. Family-owned and operated Whitten Printers continues to print and distribute this booklet. The Citizens Rule Book is available in single or bulk quantities direct from the publisher and online through Homeschool Patriot. The book is given away free through such sources as radio-host and filmmaker Alex Jones with every order from his Infowars Shop, he also offers bulk-order options. Creationist Kent Hovind sold the book online through his website.

== Notable events ==
The Citizens Rule Book had a significant role in the 1997 Idaho trials of three Christian Identity militants and members of the Idaho Militia, who identified themselves as "Phineas Priests". The three – Charles Barbee, Robert Berry and Verne Jay Merrell – were charged with bombing a Planned Parenthood abortion clinic and the Spokane Valley office of The Spokesman-Review, and with twice robbing a U.S. Bank branch (April 1 and July 12, 1996).

The book was mentioned in the opening statement for the defense in the trial of Timothy McVeigh as being possessed by one of the alternative suspects proposed by the defense.

== See also ==
- Natural law
