= Farrell Till =

American print editor

- Born: John Farrell Till; April 26, 1933; Wardell, Missouri
- Died: October 3, 2012 (aged 79); Peoria, Illinois
- Education: Harding University
- Spouse: Sandra Lou Heathcock (m. 1954)
- Children: 3

Farrell Till (April 26, 1933 – October 3, 2012) was an American publisher who served as the editor of the formerly published The Skeptical Review and was a prominent debater against Christianity and biblical inerrancy. He published critical articles of the inerrancy subject as well as skeptical examinations of other biblical interpretations.

Till was a member of People for the Ethical Treatment of Animals, the National Center for Science Education, and the Council for Secular Humanism.

Till was a part-time minister and missionary for the Church of Christ, but left the church in 1963 and later became an atheist. In addition to having edited The Skeptical Review, Till ran the "Errancy" list, which discusses biblical contradictions and errors. He formally and informally debated with numerous Christian thinkers and evangelists, including Christian apologist Norman Geisler and Young Earth creationism advocate Kent Hovind.
