= Don Doig =

American activist and politician

- Born: Don Doig
- Occupations: Activist, politician, associate policy analyst

Don Doig is the co-founder of the non-profit group Fully Informed Jury Association in Montana, which was set up to inform Americans about their rights as jurors as well as personal liberties. He was the national coordinator for the organization. He is associated with the Jefferson River Coalition. He is also a former Libertarian Party candidate. He also wrote He Who Pays the Piper: Federal Funding Of Research, and was an associate policy analyst at the Cato Institute.

== Background ==
Doig was a medical researcher but he left his career to found the Fully Informed Jury Association. He has written articles that have been published in the US~Observer.

He has maintained an active approach to the passing of bills, and matters including what is supposed to be guaranteed in the constitution or states having the power to establish their own rules of governance. On January 31, 1995, he attended the 54th Legislature in relation to the latter. On January 28, 2005, Doig and Elias Alias who co founded the Jefferson River Coalition, drove to Helena to discuss with the Judiciary Committee of the Montana House of Representatives about the introduction of some bills. They went to speak about four bills that were introduced for passage. One he spoke to the committee about was about federal agencies which had become abusive and arrogant. Another one of them he was addressing was HB 287, which related to the Patriot Act and even though the act could not be repealed, Montana would have the choice not to enforce it. Doig was in agreement of this and rose to his feet in support. He was present at Montana's 61st Legislature in February 2009. This was a hearing relating to HJ 24. This was to urge Congress to halt deficit spending and also to adopt a monetary system as per the constitution.

His "The Farming of Washington: How U.S. Agricultural Policies Affect the American Farm" has been referenced in A Blueprint for jobs and industrial growth by Heritage Foundation (Washington, D.C.), Official lies: how Washington misleads us by James T. Bennett, Thomas J. DiLorenzo and The Cato Handbook for Congress: 104th Congress by The Cato Institute.

=== Personal ===
He comes from Helmville, Montana, and he is related to the author Ivan Doig.

Doig has published the Montana Fly Fishing Report, an online guide for fly fishing enthusiasts.

=== Fully Informed Jury Association ===
Along with Larry Dodge, Doig co founded the Association, to enable potential jurors to be aware of jury independence and their right to deliver an independent verdict. The idea to form the FIJA came from Doig and fellow libertarian activist Larry Dodge. After forming the organization they launched a campaign across 35 states in a bid to change the law so that judges would have to accurately inform jurors of their right to vote their consciences when deciding on a verdict. Along with Stewart Rhodes, he co-wrote the article Guerrilla Jurors: Sticking it to Leviathan which was first published at Lew Rockwell's website. He was quoted in The New York Times in 1994 as saying that he expected to see more prospective jurors risk jail rather than answer questions that they found to be objectionable. In The Missoulian he was quoted as saying to the House Judiciary Committee, "Trial by jury has been under attack for decades. Judges have attempted to suppress the power of the jury."

=== Medical ===
Doig has two degrees in microbiology. He has had articles published in magazines such as The Journal of experimental Medicine.

=== Political ===
In 1982 he was the Montana Libertarian Party candidate, running against Republican Bob Davies and Democrat Pat Williams. Williams won the election, taking 59 percent of the votes. Davies got 28 percent and Doig 3 percent.

== Published work ==
- Guerrilla Jurors: Sticking it to Leviathan (co-written with Stewart Rhodes)

- Cato Institute Policy Analysis No. 22: He Who Pays the Piper: Federal Funding Of Research (1983)
- The Farming of Washington: How U.S. Agricultural Policies Affect the American Farm, Cato Policy Analysis
- Anti-Friend Virus Antibody is Associated with Recovery

from Viremia and Loss of Viral Leukemia Cell-Surface Antigens in Leukemic Mice. Identification of Rfv-3 as a Gene Locus Influencing Antibody Production. (co-written with Bruce Cheseboro). 1979. Journal of Experimental Medicine, 150:9. 10–19.

- Antibody-induced Loss of Friend Virus Leukemia Cell Surface Antigens Occurs During Progression of Erythroleukemia in F1 Mice.

(co-written with Bruce Cheseboro. 1978. Journal of Experimental Medicine, 148: 1109–1121.

- Antibody-Induced Modulation of Friend Virus Cell Surface Antigens Decreases Virus Production by Persistent Erythroleukemia Cells: Influence of the Rfv-3 Gene

Bruce Chesebro, Kathy Wehrly, Don Doig and Jane Nishio Proceedings of the National Academy of Sciences of the United States of America Vol. 76, No. 11 (Nov., 1979), pp. 5784–5788

- Denial of Trial by Jury as a cause of the American Revolution
- FIJA and the Second Amendment
- Zumbo, Hunters, and the Doomsday Amendment.
- Visions of a Free, Peaceful, Just Society

I have a Nightmare, but Also a Shining Dream

- Patriotism and Native Fascism

Modified from the Montana Messenger, Vol. 1, No. 1, August 14, 2009

- How the Government Underwrites Destruction. Inquiry, June 1983, pp. 24–25.

The Politicalization of Science. Op Ed Column, The Chicago Tribune, June 14, 1983, Section 1, p. 11. Also published in the San Jose (CA) newspapers. The Ministry of Science. Inquiry, December, 1983, pp. 20–23. Farming Washington. Op Ed Column, The Houston Chronicle, Nov. 13, 1983.

- A Natural History of the Fully Informed Jury Association. The Advocate (Kentucky Department of Public Advocacy's Journal of Criminal Justice Education and Research), June 1992, 15, No. 4, pp. 109–110.
- Of Liberty and Justice for All. Connecting Link, Summer, 1994, No, 24.
- New Hope for Freedom: Fully Informed Jurors. The FIJActivist, No. 3, Spring 1990, p. 1.
- Juice Nullification. The FIJActivist, No, 20, Autumn 1995, p. 9.
- Jack Gerritsen Beat the System. Frank Turney Still Under the Gun. The FIJActivist, No. 17. Autumn, 1994, p. 1.
- Darlene and Jerry Span Win on Appeal. The FIJActivist, Vol.8, No.2, Summer 1996.
- Juries, the Bill of Rights and Federal Power. The FIJActivist, Vol 14, No. 2, Fall 2002.
- Fully Informed Juries by Larry Dodge, Don Doig – ISIL educational pamphlet series – (1999)

Partial list: dozens of additional articles on the subject of jury nullification and the Fully Informed Jury Association were published in The FIJActivist, archives available on line at www.fija.org. Many of these articles were republished widely.
