= Julian Heicklen =

American chemist and civil liberties activist

Julian Phillip Heicklen (March 9, 1932 – March 11, 2022) was an American chemist and civil liberties activist.

== Early life and education ==
Heicklen was born on March 9, 1932, in Rochester, New York.

Heicklen received a BA in chemical engineering from Cornell University in 1954. He received a PhD in chemistry from the University of Rochester in 1958.

== Career ==
After receiving his PhD, Heicklen moved to Los Angeles to work for a defense contractor.

Heicklen became a professor at Pennsylvania State University in 1967. He was well liked by the students for his unorthodox style of instruction. To increase interest in his classes, he would hand out campaign buttons and appear in class wearing a cape. To demonstrate chemical reactions, he invited school gymnasts. He retired in 1992.

== Activism ==
While working in Los Angeles, Heicklen became active in the local chapter of the Congress of Racial Equality. He was involved in activism throughout his teaching career but became more active after his retirement. After he retired in the early 1990s, he openly smoked marijuana in public in State College, Pennsylvania, as a protest against marijuana laws and to intentionally be arrested, which happened about five times. He did not smoke marijuana recreationally and did so only as a protest.

Heicklen was arrested multiple times by U.S. Department of Homeland Security federal police officers while distributing Fully Informed Jury Association (FIJA) literature at the United States District Court for the Southern District of New York.

On May 25, 2010, he was arrested after refusing to stop handing out pamphlets about jury nullification at a U.S. District Courthouse in New York City, and was indicted for jury tampering. Because of previous failures to appear in court, he was remanded to Rikers Island until his June 8 arraignment. His arrest gained national attention over the following year due to the First Amendment implications of arresting a citizen for handing out educational pamphlets.

Heicklen was arrested or fined multiple times related to distributing pamphlets on nullificiation. Heicklen wrote that during one arrest he chose to fall to the ground limp and silent; an ambulance was called and he signed his hospital release form as "John Galt."

Another activist was arrested for filming on federal property without permission while recording Heicklen's November 9, 2009 arrest. Fellow nullification activists held a protest in his defense.

On April 19, 2012, District Court Judge Kimba Wood granted Heicklen's Motion to Dismiss the Indictment as legally deficient.
