= Gary Click =

American politician (born 1965)

Member of the Ohio House of Representatives from the 88th district
- Incumbent
- Assumed office January 1, 2021
- Preceded by: Bill Reineke

Personal details
- Born: December 29, 1965 (age 60)
- Party: Republican
- Spouse: Nanette
- Children: 4
- Education: Midwestern Baptist College (BRE)
- Occupation: Politician; pastor

Gary N. Click (born December 29, 1965) is an American politician, the Ohio state representative from its 88th district. He won the seat in 2020, after incumbent Republican Bill Reineke left it to run for the Ohio Senate, defeating Democrat Chris Liebold 62.9% to 37.1%.

== Career ==
Click earned a Bachelor of Religious Education from Midwestern Baptist College in 1990. In 2006, Click became a pastor to the Fremont Baptist Temple and has held that position ever since. He has worked in ministry for over 30 years and claims to have served many aspects including youth ministry, bus ministry, writing, radio, Christian education, and lobbying Congress on behalf of churches and Christian schools. He has also served as a chaplain for law enforcement and in hospice care.

== Positions ==
=== Abortion ===
Click opposes abortion. In 2022, Click and seven co-sponsors introduced a bill titled "The Personhood Act" which would ban abortion state-wide from the moment of conception. In 2023, Click criticized Ohio's issue 1 ballot initiative which would create a constitutional right to abortion in Ohio, calling it "worse than Roe".

=== LGBT rights ===
Click opposes LGBT rights and supports conversion therapy for gay and trans people. In a sermon by Click discovered by Ohio Capital Journal, Click admitted to having helped with attempted conversion therapy. After condemning a California bill that sought to ban the practice as "an assault on the First Amendment," he described conversion therapy as counseling "someone who struggles with those same-sex attractions, or struggles with their gender identity," by showing them "what the bible says" and how to be "at one with the body God gave them." Click also emphasized his view that God provided a specific plan for the family and suggested that homosexuality, trans people, and single-parent homes all break from this plan.

Click has called gender-affirming care for minors "child abuse". In 2022, Click introduced a bill that would ban gender-affirming care for minors in Ohio. After that bill failed to pass, he introduced House Bill 68 in February 2023, which would ban gender-affirming care for minors as well as ban trans women from competing in women's sports. The bill passed the legislature in December 2023, but was vetoed by Governor Mike DeWine. In January 2024, the legislature overrode DeWine's veto thereby making the bill law. However, on April 16, 2024, a judge temporarily blocked the law from taking effect. On August 6, 2024, a judge overturned the injunction and allowed the law to take effect immediately. The plaintiffs immediately announced an appeal. On March 18, 2025, the state's 10th District Court of Appeals reversed the judge's decision and reinstated the injunction. On April 30, 2025, the Supreme Court of Ohio ruled 4-3 that the ban could take effect while further court battles play out.

In January 2024, in a conversation about trans healthcare with several Republican legislators, Michigan State Rep. Josh Schriver asked, "If we are going to stop this for anyone under 18, why not apply it for anyone over 18? It’s harmful across the board and that’s something we need to take into consideration in terms of the endgame." Michigan State Rep. Brad Paquette and Gary Click expressed agreement with that sentiment.

In October 2024, Click expressed opposition to a Baldwin Wallace University poll which attempted to measure Ohio voter's support for transgender rights and other political issues. Click objected to the poll using the term "gender identity" in the questions, saying that "There is no such thing as gender identity ... You are either male or you are female."

== Personal life ==
Click met and married his wife Nanette while in college. They have four sons, Nathaneil, Zachary, Garrison, and Micah, and four grandchildren. Click and his wife reside in Vickery, Ohio.

== Election history ==
Election results
Year	Office	Election	Subject	Party	Votes	%	Opponent	Party	Votes	%	Opponent	Party	Votes	%	Opponent	Party	Votes	%
2016	Sandusky County Commissioner	Primary	Gary Click	Republican	1,861	17.55%	Kay E. Reiter	Republican	3,305	31.18%	John C. Havens	Republican	3,159	29.80%	Justin C. Smith	Republican	2,276	21.47%
2020	Ohio House of Representatives	Primary	Gary Click	Republican	5,555	41.25%	Shayne Thomas	Republican	4,789	35.56%	Ed Ollom	Republican	3,124	23.20%				
2020	Ohio House of Representatives	General	Gary Click	Republican	32,823	62.90%	Chris Liebold	Democratic	19,359	37.10%								
