= Jury Nullification (book) =

1998 book by Clay Conrad

Jury Nullification: The Evolution of a Doctrine
- Author: Clay Conrad
- Language: English
- Subject: Jury nullification
- Published: 1998, Carolina Academic Press
- Publication place: United States
- Media type: Print
- Pages: 311
- ISBN: 0890897026
- OCLC: 40622647
- Dewey Decimal: 347.7375
- LC Class: KF8982

Jury Nullification: The Evolution of a Doctrine, by Clay Conrad, is one of the major book-length treatments of jury nullification. The Federal Lawyer noted, "Conrad provides...a comprehensive overview of jury nullification in historical, substantive, policy, and practical terms." The Cato Institute refers to the book as an "eye-opening history" of jury independence, the relevant laws, and the implications of jury nullification. The book surveys the history of jury nullification, describing how it has changed with cases such as Sparf v. United States and with the advent of death-qualified juries. It ends with a chapter of advice for those pursuing a nullification-based defense.
