= Fourth Reich of the Rich =

1976 book by Des Griffin

- Author: Des Griffin
- Original title: The Missing Dimension in World Affairs
- Language: English
- Subject: Illuminati
- Publisher: Emissary Publications
- Publication date: 1978
- Publication place: United States
- Media type: Print
- Pages: 309 pages
- ISBN: 0-941380-06-8
- OCLC: 26886416

Fourth Reich of the Rich is a book by self-styled Christian writer Des Griffin about the Illuminati. It was published in 1976 by Emissary Publications. It was initially published under the title The Missing Dimension in World Affairs, getting its current title in the 1978 edition. The first edition was published under the pseudonym "Michael J. Goy", a reference to the Yiddish exonym for non-Jew, goy.

The book focuses on a conspiratorial telling of history and religion, in which, Griffin writes, the Illuminati plays a central role. His ideology builds off of the works of several previous conspiracy theorists; unlike these previous Illuminati conspiracy theorists, Griffin gives a more theological view and traces the history of the Illuminati far further back, to the rebellion of Lucifer against God. This idea is based off of previous concepts of a Satanic cult established by Nimrod. Griffin claims the Illuminati is a tool of Lucifer to gain control of the Earth; in associating the Illuminati with revolutionary activity, he associates it with anti-Semitism.

Griffin embraces the antisemitic conspiracy tract the Protocols of the Elders of Zion, considering it the "Master Plan" (always rendered in capital letters) of the Illuminati; he accuses Jews of being a key role in the plot, but not the only part of it. Griffin blames the Jews for the plot; however, he also says that while numerous Jews are involved in the plot, the Illuminati itself blamed Jews as a distraction. Much of the book is made up of excerpts from the Protocols.

In a discussion of the work, scholar Michael Barkun analyzed the book, considering it to be among the earliest instances of what he termed a "superconspiracy". He described it as an "antisemitic tract" and wrote that it was notable in Griffin's "fusion of this version of sacred history with conspiracist explanations of modern politics". He credited it with launching a "staple of conspiracism in the 1990s", the reinterpretation of the Protocols of the Elders of Zion as a work about and written by the Illuminati.

Scholar Bill Ellis also credited it with spreading this variation of the Illuminati conspiracy on the right-wing. Robert Singerman included the book in his annotated bibliography of antisemitism, describing it as presenting a tale of a "Satan-inspired, Illuminist blueprint for the systematic destruction of civilization, all government and religion". Nicholas Goodrick-Clarke wrote that it was "highly influential" among conspiracy theorists, and that Griffin's ideas afterwards "extended through new combinations in the books, bulletins and periodicals of conspiracy buffs".
