= Embassy of Heaven =

Micronation

The Embassy of Heaven is a Christianity-based new religious movement based in Stayton, Oregon, that seeks to separate from secular government. Its members profess to be literal citizens of the Kingdom of Heaven and reject any ties to what they refer to as "worldly governments". The organization issues its own identity documents (including passports and driver's licenses), business licenses, motor vehicle title certificates, and license plates. The group's leader is Craig Douglas Fleshman, a former Oregon state computer systems analyst who goes by the name "Pastor Paul Revere”. Another individual who has been associated with the organization in the past is Glen Stoll, an individual who "falsely hold[s] himself out to be a 'lawyer' and claims to have spent considerable time studying the tax laws" but who "is not a member of or licensed with any state or federal bar."

The Anti-Defamation League has identified the Embassy of Heaven group as being part of the sovereign citizen movement. Federal authorities have asserted that the organization is set up to avoid paying taxes. Although its leaders refer to themselves as lawyers, none have any legal education or have passed the bar exam. The organization has run afoul of tax codes because it does not recognize the authority of the United States. In 1997, sheriff's deputies raided the group's property and seized it for non-payment of taxes. Pastor Revere insisted the taxes were not owed because the property was "a separate nation". Several members have been arrested for driving cars with "Kingdom of Heaven" license plates and showing similar driver's licenses to law enforcement officers.

In 2012, Minnesota state insurance regulators ordered the Embassy of Heaven Church to stop making what the regulators called misrepresentations, using the name "Mutual Assurance", in connection with the sale of insurance in Minnesota. The regulators asserted that a type of auto insurance promoted by the group is bogus, and that the group had no license to sell insurance in Minnesota. Embassy of Heaven spokesman Paul Revere responded, asserting that the group does not sell insurance. Revere was also quoted as saying, "We don't operate in Minnesota. ... We operate in the Kingdom of Heaven."

== Indictment ==
In early 2019, Glen Stoll was indicted by a federal grand jury in Portland, Oregon on charges of conspiracy to defraud the United States, bank fraud, conspiracy to commit bank fraud, making a false statement on a loan application, and three counts of tax evasion. The trial is set to begin on February 4, 2020.

In early 2021, Glen Stoll entered into a plea agreement. The agreement dated January 15, 2021 has Stoll pleading guilty to conspiracy to defraud the United States and evading the payment of federal income taxes.
