= Des Griffin =

American author (born 1934)

Des Griffin (born 1934) is an American author who writes from what he claims to be a firmly Christian standpoint, and who documents what he alleges are the global agendas of the New World Order, as declared by President George H. W. Bush on March 6, 1991. His books show the alleged links between government corruption and the influence of the Rothschilds Illuminati Agenda, as well as Freemasonry and "world banks". He believes in the secret influence of the Rothschild family and the Rockefellers in world politics. His book Fourth Reich of the Rich was reprinted eight times and his main essays were translated into German. In the 1980s, one of his main accomplishments was his investigating Dr. Martin Luther King's story by revealing what he called "the man behind the myth".

In 1975, he was a primary founder of the independent publishing house Emissary Publications (South Pasadena, California, then Colton, Oregon). He also edits the Midnight Messenger Newspaper (1985–), which he often updates himself on the Emissary website, and writes for Conspiracy Nation. Based on his writings on Zionism, the Anti-Defamation League (ADL) has called him an "anti-Semitic conspiracy theorist."

Griffin was born in Northern Ireland.

== Works ==
- The Missing Dimension in World Affairs, South Pasadena, CA, Emissary Publications, 1976.
- Fourth Reich of the Rich, South Pasadena, CA, Emissary Publications, 1976; 1979; 1981; 1992; 1994 Revised from The Missing Dimension in World Affairs; Colton, OR, Emissary Publications, 1995 Revised edition, 1998 and 2000.
- Descent into Slavery?, South Pasadena, CA, Emissary Publications, 1976, 1979, 1980, 1981.
- Martin Luther King: the Man Behind The Myth, Colton, OR, Emissary Publications, 1987.
- Anti-Semitism and the Babylonian Connection, Colton, OR, Emissary Publications, 1988.
- Storming the Gates of Hell, Colton, OR, Emissary Publications, 1996.
- Biblical Insights Into "God's Chosen People", Colton, OR, Emissary Publications [n.d.].

=== Audio cassette ===
- The Truth about Martin Luther King, "Pastor Pete Peters interviews Des Griffin, author of the book Martin Luther King: The Man Behind the Myth, about the life and times of the late civil rights leader, recorded live on the "Scriptures For America" radio program on January 19, 1998" as presented on Emissary Publications.
