= Lenox, Alabama =

Unincorporated community in Brownsville, Alabama

- Unincorporated community
- Location within Alabama Location within the United States
- Coordinates: 31°20′12″N 87°11′08″W
- Country: United States
- State: Alabama
- County: Conecuh
- Elevation: 289 ft (88 m)

Population (2017)
  - Total: 37
- Time zone: UTC-6 (Central (CST))
  - Summer (DST): UTC-5 (CDT)
- ZIP code: 36454
- Area code: 251
- GNIS feature ID: 121500

Lenox is an unincorporated community in Conecuh County, Alabama, United States. Lenox is 10 miles (16 km) west-northwest of Castleberry. Lenox had a post office until it closed on June 13, 1998; it still has its own ZIP code, 36454, but is grouped in with the city of Repton, Al. Joseph Ryals was the first postmaster who also owned the settlement's general store. It is claimed he named the location after a bar of Lenox soap, in order for the post office to be authorized. Lenox is also home to young earth creationist Kent Hovind, as well as his Dinosaur Adventure Land ministry and amusement park.
