= Creationism =

Belief that nature originated through supernatural acts

Creationism is the religious belief that nature, and aspects such as the universe, Earth, life, and humans, originated with supernatural acts of divine creation, and is often pseudoscientific. In its broadest sense, creationism includes various religious views, which differ in their acceptance or rejection of modern scientific concepts, such as evolution, that describe the origin and development of natural phenomena.

The term creationism most often refers to belief in special creation: the claim that the universe and lifeforms were created as they exist today by divine action, and that the only true explanations are those which are compatible with a Christian fundamentalist literal interpretation of the creation myth found in the Bible's Genesis creation narrative. Since the 1970s, the most common form of this has been Young Earth creationism which posits special creation of the universe and lifeforms within the last 10,000 years on the basis of flood geology, and promotes pseudoscientific creation science. From the 18th century onward, Old Earth creationism accepted geological time harmonized with Genesis through gap or day-age theory, while supporting anti-evolution. Modern old-Earth creationists support progressive creationism and continue to reject evolutionary explanations. Following political controversy, creation science was reformulated as intelligent design and neo-creationism.

Mainline Protestants and the Catholic Church reconcile modern science with their faith in Creation through forms of theistic evolution which hold that God purposefully created through the laws of nature, and accept evolution. Some groups call their belief evolutionary creationism. Less prominently, there are also members of the Islamic, Jewish, and Hindu faiths, among others, who are creationists. Use of the term "creationist" in this context dates back to Charles Darwin's unpublished 1842 sketch draft for what became On the Origin of Species, and he used the term later in letters to colleagues. In 1873, Asa Gray published an article in The Nation saying a "special creationist" who held that species "were supernaturally originated just as they are, by the very terms of his doctrine places them out of the reach of scientific explanation."

== Biblical basis ==
The basis for many creationists' beliefs is a literal or quasi-literal interpretation of the Book of Genesis. The Genesis creation narratives (Genesis 1–2) describe how God brings the Universe into being in a series of creative acts over six days and places the first man and woman (Adam and Eve) in the Garden of Eden. This story is the basis of creationist cosmology and biology. The Genesis flood narrative (Genesis 6–9) tells how God destroys the world and all life through a great flood, saving representatives of each form of life by means of Noah's Ark. This forms the basis of creationist geology, better known as flood geology.

Recent decades have seen attempts to recast creationism as science instead of solely a Biblical interpretation; these include creation science and intelligent design. These movements have been thoroughly rejected by mainstream science and are considered pseudoscience (see §Philosophic and scientific creationism below).

== Diversity among creationists ==
To counter the common misunderstanding that the creation–evolution controversy was a simple dichotomy of views, with "creationists" set against "evolutionists", Eugenie Scott of the National Center for Science Education produced a diagram and description of a continuum of religious views as a spectrum ranging from extreme literal biblical creationism to materialist evolution, grouped under main headings. This was used in public presentations, then published in 1999 in Reports of the NCSE. Other versions of a taxonomy of creationists were produced, and comparisons made between the different groupings. In 2009 Scott produced a revised continuum taking account of these issues, emphasizing that intelligent design creationism overlaps other types, and each type is a grouping of various beliefs and positions. The revised diagram is labelled to shows a spectrum relating to positions on the age of the Earth, and the part played by special creation as against evolution. This was published in the book Evolution Vs. Creationism: An Introduction, and the NCSE website rewritten on the basis of the book version.

Both microevolution and natural selection are accepted to occur by all creationists.

General major creationist views
View	Humanity	Biological species	Earth	Age of Universe
Young Earth creationism	Directly created by God.	Directly created by God. Macroevolution between created kinds does not occur.	Less than 10,000 years old. Reshaped by global flood.	Less than 10,000 years old, but some hold this view only for the Solar System.
Gap creationism	Directly created by God.	Directly created by God. Macroevolution between created kinds does not occur.	Scientifically accepted age. Reshaped by global flood.	Scientifically accepted age.
Progressive creationism	Directly created by God, based on primate anatomy.	Direct creation + evolution. No single common ancestor.	Scientifically accepted age. No global flood.	Scientifically accepted age.
Intelligent design	Proponents hold various beliefs. (For example, Michael Behe accepts evolution from primates.)	Divine intervention at some point in the past, as evidenced by what intelligent-design creationists call "irreducible complexity." Some adherents accept common descent, others do not.	Some claim the existence of Earth is the result of divine intervention.	Scientifically accepted age.
Theistic evolution (evolutionary creationism)	Evolution from primates.	Evolution from single common ancestor.	Scientifically accepted age. No global flood.	Scientifically accepted age.

=== Young Earth creationism ===
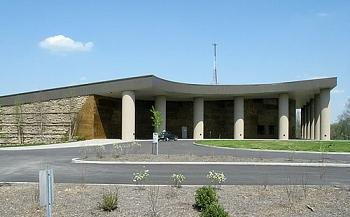
The Creation Museum is a young Earth creationism museum run by Answers in Genesis (AiG) in Petersburg, Kentucky, United States.

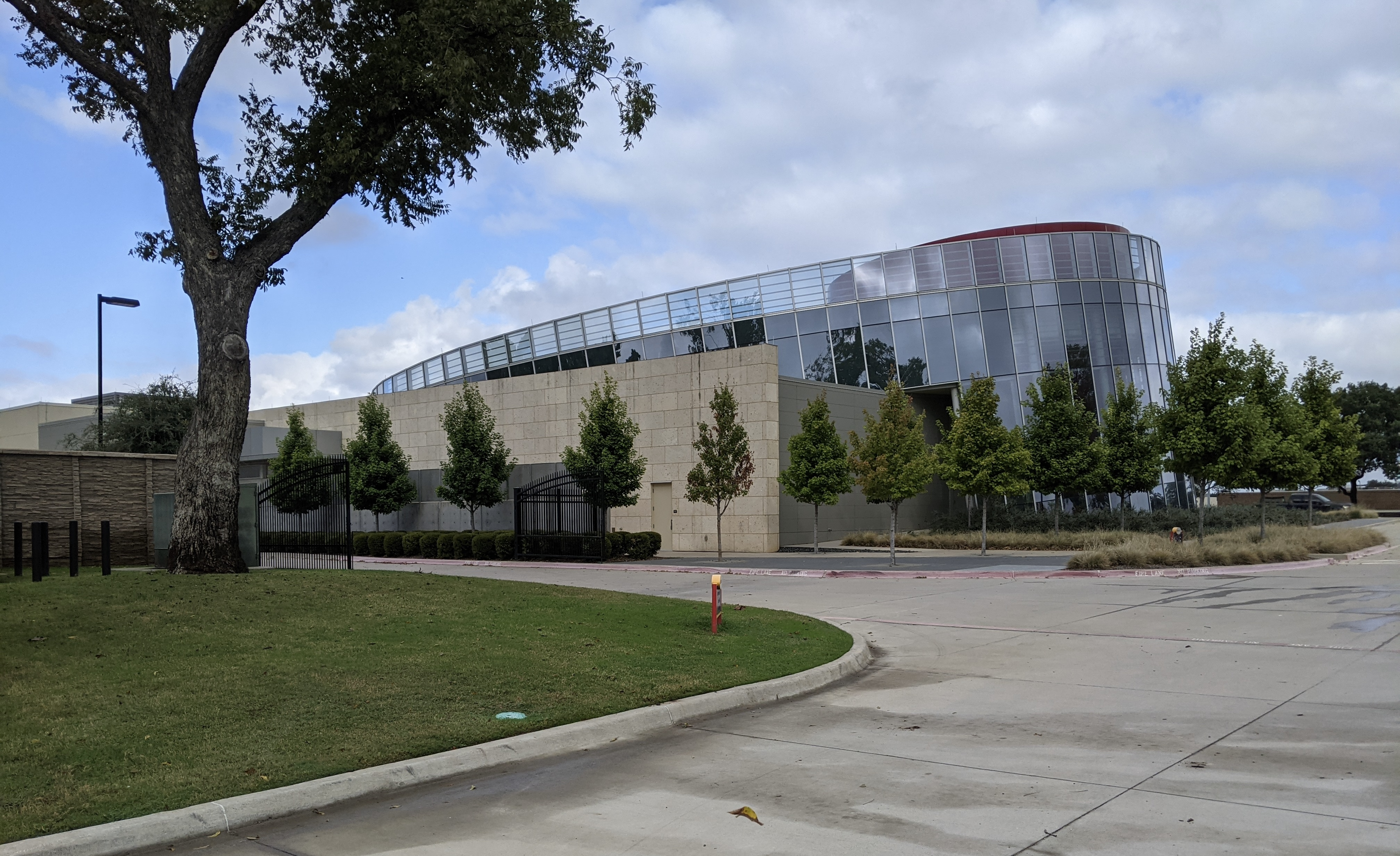
The ICR Discovery Center for Science & Earth History is a young Earth creationist museum run by Institute for Creation Research (ICR) in Dallas, Texas, United States.

Young Earth creationists such as Ken Ham and Doug Phillips believe that God created the Earth within the last ten thousand years, with a literalist interpretation of the Genesis creation narrative, within the approximate time-frame of biblical genealogies. Most young Earth creationists believe that the universe has a similar age as the Earth. A few assign a much older age to the universe than to Earth. Young Earth creationism gives the universe an age consistent with the Ussher chronology and other young Earth time frames. Other young Earth creationists believe that the Earth and the universe were created with the appearance of age, so that the world appears to be much older than it is, and that this appearance is what gives the geological findings and other methods of dating the Earth and the universe their much longer timelines.

The Christian organizations Answers in Genesis (AiG), Institute for Creation Research (ICR) and the Creation Research Society (CRS) promote young Earth creationism in the United States. Carl Baugh's Creation Evidence Museum in Texas, United States AiG's Creation Museum and Ark Encounter in Kentucky, United States were opened to promote young Earth creationism. Creation Ministries International promotes young Earth views in Australia, Canada, South Africa, New Zealand, the United States, and the United Kingdom.

Among Roman Catholics, the Kolbe Center for the Study of Creation promotes similar ideas.

=== Old Earth creationism ===
Old Earth creationism holds that the physical universe was created by God, but that the creation event described in the Book of Genesis is to be taken figuratively. This group generally believes that the age of the universe and the age of the Earth are as described by astronomers and geologists, but that details of modern evolutionary theory are questionable.

Old Earth creationism itself comes in at least three types:

==== Gap creationism ====
Gap creationism (also known as ruin-restoration creationism, restoration creationism, or the Gap Theory) is a form of old Earth creationism that posits that the six-yom creation period, as described in the Book of Genesis, involved six literal 24-hour days, but that there was a gap of time between two distinct creations in the first and the second verses of Genesis, which the theory states explains many scientific observations, including the age of the Earth. Thus, the six days of creation (verse 3 onwards) start sometime after the Earth was "without form and void." This allows an indefinite gap of time to be inserted after the original creation of the universe, but prior to the Genesis creation narrative, (when present biological species and humanity were created). Gap theorists can therefore agree with the scientific consensus regarding the age of the Earth and universe, while maintaining a literal interpretation of the biblical text.

Some gap creationists expand the basic version of creationism by proposing a "primordial creation" of biological life within the "gap" of time. This is thought to be "the world that then was" mentioned in 2 Peter 3:3–6. Discoveries of fossils and archaeological ruins older than 10,000 years are generally ascribed to this "world that then was," which may also be associated with Lucifer's rebellion.

==== Day-age creationism ====
Day-age creationism, a type of old Earth creationism, is a metaphorical interpretation of the creation accounts in Genesis. It holds that the six days referred to in the Genesis account of creation are not ordinary 24-hour days, but are much longer periods (from thousands to billions of years). The Genesis account is then reconciled with the age of the Earth. Proponents of the day-age theory can be found among both theistic evolutionists, who accept the scientific consensus on evolution, and progressive creationists, who reject it. The theories are said to be built on the understanding that the Hebrew word yom is also used to refer to a time period, with a beginning and an end and not necessarily that of a 24-hour day.

The day-age theory attempts to reconcile the Genesis creation narrative and modern science by asserting that the creation "days" were not ordinary 24-hour days, but actually lasted for long periods of time (as day-age implies, the "days" each lasted an age). According to this view, the sequence and duration of the creation "days" may be paralleled to the scientific consensus for the age of the earth and the universe.

==== Progressive creationism ====
Progressive creationism is the religious belief that God created new forms of life gradually over a period of hundreds of millions of years. As a form of old Earth creationism, it accepts mainstream geological and cosmological estimates for the age of the Earth, some tenets of biology such as microevolution as well as archaeology to make its case. In this view creation occurred in rapid bursts in which all "kinds" of plants and animals appear in stages lasting millions of years. The bursts are followed by periods of stasis or equilibrium to accommodate new arrivals. These bursts represent instances of God creating new types of organisms by divine intervention. As viewed from the archaeological record, progressive creationism holds that "species do not gradually appear by the steady transformation of its ancestors; [but] appear all at once and "fully formed."

The view rejects macroevolution, claiming it is biologically untenable and not supported by the fossil record, as well as rejects the concept of common descent from a last universal common ancestor. Thus the evidence for macroevolution is claimed to be false, but microevolution is accepted as a genetic parameter designed by the Creator into the fabric of genetics to allow for environmental adaptations and survival. Generally, it is viewed by proponents as a middle ground between literal creationism and evolution. Organizations such as Reasons To Believe, founded by Hugh Ross, promote this version of creationism.

Progressive creationism can be held in conjunction with hermeneutic approaches to the Genesis creation narrative such as the day-age creationism or framework/metaphoric/poetic views.

=== Philosophic and scientific creationism ===
==== Creation science ====
Creation science, or initially scientific creationism, is a pseudoscience (Note: Attributed to multiple sources:) that emerged in the 1960s with proponents aiming to have young Earth creationist beliefs taught in school science classes as a counter to teaching of evolution. Common features of creation science argument include: creationist cosmologies which accommodate a universe on the order of thousands of years old, criticism of radiometric dating through a technical argument about radiohalos, explanations for the fossil record as a record of the Genesis flood narrative (see flood geology), and explanations for the present diversity as a result of pre-designed genetic variability and partially due to the rapid degradation of the perfect genomes God placed in "created kinds" or "baramins" due to mutations.

==== Neo-creationism ====
Neo-creationism is a pseudoscientific movement which aims to restate creationism in terms more likely to be well received by the public, by policy makers, by educators and by the scientific community. It aims to re-frame the debate over the origins of life in non-religious terms and without appeals to scripture. This comes in response to the 1987 ruling by the United States Supreme Court in Edwards v. Aguillard that creationism is an inherently religious concept and that advocating it as correct or accurate in public-school curricula violates the Establishment Clause of the First Amendment.

One of the principal claims of neo-creationism propounds that ostensibly objective orthodox science, with a foundation in naturalism, is actually a dogmatically atheistic religion. Its proponents argue that the scientific method excludes certain explanations of phenomena, particularly where they point towards supernatural elements, thus effectively excluding religious insight from contributing to understanding the universe. This leads to an open and often hostile opposition to what neo-creationists term "Darwinism", which they generally mean to refer to evolution, but which they may extend to include such concepts as abiogenesis, stellar evolution and the Big Bang theory.

Unlike their philosophical forebears, neo-creationists largely do not believe in many of the traditional cornerstones of creationism such as a young Earth, or in a dogmatically literal interpretation of the Bible.

==== Intelligent design ====
Intelligent design (ID) is a pseudoscientific attempt to frame creationism in the language of science, with a view to having it taught in public schools. All of its leading proponents are associated with the Discovery Institute, a think tank whose wedge strategy aims to replace the scientific method with "a science consonant with Christian and theistic convictions" which accepts supernatural explanations. It is widely accepted in the scientific and academic communities that intelligent design is a form of creationism, (Note: Attributed to multiple sources:) and is sometimes referred to as "intelligent design creationism."

ID originated as a re-branding of creation science in an attempt to avoid a series of court decisions ruling out the teaching of creationism in American public schools, and the Discovery Institute has run a series of campaigns to change school curricula. In Australia, where curricula are under the control of state governments rather than local school boards, there was a public outcry when the notion of ID being taught in science classes was raised by the Federal Education Minister Brendan Nelson; the minister quickly conceded that the correct forum for ID, if it were to be taught, is in religious or philosophy classes.

In the US, teaching of intelligent design in public schools has been decisively ruled by a federal district court to be in violation of the Establishment Clause of the First Amendment to the United States Constitution. In Kitzmiller v. Dover, the court found that intelligent design is not science and "cannot uncouple itself from its creationist, and thus religious, antecedents," and hence cannot be taught as an alternative to evolution in public school science classrooms under the jurisdiction of that court. This sets a persuasive precedent, based on previous US Supreme Court decisions in Edwards v. Aguillard and Epperson v. Arkansas (1968), and by the application of the Lemon test, that creates a legal hurdle to teaching intelligent design in public school districts in other federal court jurisdictions.

=== Geocentrism ===
In astronomy, the geocentric model (also known as geocentrism, or the Ptolemaic system), is a description of the cosmos where Earth is at the orbital center of all celestial bodies. This model served as the predominant cosmological system in many ancient civilizations such as ancient Greece. As such, they assumed that the Sun, Moon, stars, and naked eye planets circled Earth, including the noteworthy systems of Aristotle (see Aristotelian physics) and Ptolemy.

Articles arguing that geocentrism was the biblical perspective appeared in some early creation science newsletters associated with the Creation Research Society pointing to some passages in the Bible, which, when taken literally, indicate that the daily apparent motions of the Sun and the Moon are due to their actual motions around the Earth rather than due to the rotation of the Earth about its axis. For example, Joshua 10:12–13 where the Sun and Moon are said to stop in the sky, and Psalms 93:1 where the world is described as immobile. Contemporary advocates for such religious beliefs include Robert Sungenis, co-author of the self-published Galileo Was Wrong: The Church Was Right (2006). These people subscribe to the view that a plain reading of the Bible contains an accurate account of the manner in which the universe was created and requires a geocentric worldview. Most contemporary creationist organizations reject such perspectives. (Note: Donald B. DeYoung, for example, states that "Similar terminology is often used today when we speak of the sun's rising and setting, even though the earth, not the sun, is doing the moving. Bible writers used the 'language of appearance,' just as people always have. Without it, the intended message would be awkward at best and probably not understood clearly. When the Bible touches on scientific subjects, it is entirely accurate.")

=== Omphalos hypothesis ===
The Omphalos hypothesis is one attempt to reconcile the scientific evidence that the universe is billions of years old with a literal interpretation of the Genesis creation narrative, which implies that the Earth is only a few thousand years old. It is based on the religious belief that the universe was created by a divine being, within the past six to ten thousand years (in keeping with flood geology), and that the presence of objective, verifiable evidence that the universe is older than approximately ten millennia is due to the creator introducing false evidence that makes the universe appear significantly older.

The idea was named after the title of an 1857 book, Omphalos by Philip Henry Gosse, in which Gosse argued that in order for the world to be functional God must have created the Earth with mountains and canyons, trees with growth rings, Adam and Eve with fully grown hair, fingernails, and navels (ὀμφαλός omphalos is Greek for "navel"), and all living creatures with fully formed evolutionary features, etc..., and that, therefore, no empirical evidence about the age of the Earth or universe can be taken as reliable.

Various supporters of Young Earth creationism have given different explanations for their belief that the universe is filled with false evidence of the universe's age, including a belief that some things needed to be created at a certain age for the ecosystems to function, or their belief that the creator was deliberately planting deceptive evidence. The idea has seen some revival in the 20th century by some modern creationists, who have extended the argument to address the "starlight problem". The idea has been criticised as Last Thursdayism, and on the grounds that it requires a deliberately deceptive creator.

== Theistic evolution ==
Theistic evolution, or evolutionary creation, is a belief that "the personal God of the Bible created the universe and life through evolutionary processes." According to the American Scientific Affiliation:

A theory of theistic evolution (TE) – also called evolutionary creation – proposes that God's method of creation was to cleverly design a universe in which everything would naturally evolve. Usually the "evolution" in "theistic evolution" means Total Evolution – astronomical evolution (to form galaxies, solar systems,...) and geological evolution (to form the earth's geology) plus chemical evolution (to form the first life) and biological evolution (for the development of life) – but it can refer only to biological evolution.

Through the 19th century the term creationism most commonly referred to direct creation of individual souls, in contrast to traducianism. Following the publication of Vestiges of the Natural History of Creation, there was interest in ideas of Creation by divine law. In particular, the liberal theologian Baden Powell argued that this illustrated the Creator's power better than the idea of miraculous creation, which he thought ridiculous. When On the Origin of Species was published, the cleric Charles Kingsley wrote of evolution as "just as noble a conception of Deity." Darwin's view at the time was of God creating life through the laws of nature, and the book makes several references to "creation," though he later regretted using the term rather than calling it an unknown process. In America, Asa Gray argued that evolution is the secondary effect, or modus operandi, of the first cause, design, and published a pamphlet defending the book in theistic terms, Natural Selection not inconsistent with Natural Theology. Theistic evolution, also called, evolutionary creation, became a popular compromise, and St. George Jackson Mivart was among those accepting evolution but attacking Darwin's naturalistic mechanism. Eventually it was realised that supernatural intervention could not be a scientific explanation, and naturalistic mechanisms such as neo-Lamarckism were favoured as being more compatible with purpose than natural selection.

Some theists took the general view that, instead of faith being in opposition to biological evolution, some or all classical religious teachings about Christian God and creation are compatible with some or all of modern scientific theory, including specifically evolution; it is also known as "evolutionary creation." In Evolution versus Creationism, Eugenie Scott and Niles Eldredge state that it is in fact a type of evolution.

It generally views evolution as a tool used by God, who is both the first cause and immanent sustainer/upholder of the universe; it is therefore well accepted by people of strong theistic (as opposed to deistic) convictions. Theistic evolution can synthesize with the day-age creationist interpretation of the Genesis creation narrative; however most adherents consider that the first chapters of the Book of Genesis should not be interpreted as a "literal" description, but rather as a literary framework or allegory.

From a theistic viewpoint, the underlying laws of nature were designed by God for a purpose, and are so self-sufficient that the complexity of the entire physical universe evolved from fundamental particles in processes such as stellar evolution, life forms developed in biological evolution, and in the same way the origin of life by natural causes has resulted from these laws.

In one form or another, theistic evolution is the view of creation taught at the majority of mainline Protestant seminaries. For Roman Catholics, human evolution is not a matter of religious teaching, and must stand or fall on its own scientific merits. Evolution and the Roman Catholic Church are not in conflict. The Catechism of the Catholic Church comments positively on the theory of evolution, which is neither precluded nor required by the sources of faith, stating that scientific studies "have splendidly enriched our knowledge of the age and dimensions of the cosmos, the development of life-forms and the appearance of man." Roman Catholic schools teach evolution without controversy on the basis that scientific knowledge does not extend beyond the physical, and scientific truth and religious truth cannot be in conflict. Theistic evolution can be described as "creationism" in holding that divine intervention brought about the origin of life or that divine laws govern formation of species, though many creationists (in the strict sense) would deny that the position is creationism at all. In the creation–evolution controversy, its proponents generally take the "evolutionist" side. This sentiment was expressed by Fr. George Coyne, (the Vatican's chief astronomer between 1978 and 2006):

...in America, creationism has come to mean some fundamentalistic, literal, scientific interpretation of Genesis. Judaic-Christian faith is radically creationist, but in a totally different sense. It is rooted in a belief that everything depends upon God, or better, all is a gift from God.

While supporting the methodological naturalism inherent in modern science, the proponents of theistic evolution reject the implication taken by some atheists that this gives credence to ontological materialism. In fact, many modern philosophers of science, including atheists, refer to the long-standing convention in the scientific method that observable events in nature should be explained by natural causes, with the distinction that it does not assume the actual existence or non-existence of the supernatural.

== By religion ==
There are also non-Christian forms of creationism, notably Islamic creationism and Hindu creationism.

=== Baháʼí Faith ===
In the creation myth taught by Baháʼu'lláh, the Baháʼí Faith founder, the universe has "neither beginning nor ending," and that the component elements of the material world have always existed and will always exist. With regard to evolution and the origin of human beings, ʻAbdu'l-Bahá gave extensive comments on the subject when he addressed western audiences in the beginning of the 20th century. Transcripts of these comments can be found in Some Answered Questions, Paris Talks and The Promulgation of Universal Peace. ʻAbdu'l-Bahá described the human species as having evolved from a primitive form to modern man, but that the capacity to form human intelligence was always in existence.

=== Buddhism ===
Buddhism denies a creator deity and posits that mundane deities such as Mahabrahma are sometimes misperceived to be a creator. While Buddhism includes belief in divine beings called devas, it holds that they are mortal, limited in their power, and that none of them are creators of the universe. In the Saṃyutta Nikāya, the Buddha also states that the cycle of rebirths stretches back hundreds of thousands of eons, without discernible beginning.

Major Buddhist Indian philosophers such as Nagarjuna, Vasubandhu, Dharmakirti and Buddhaghosa, consistently critiqued Creator God views put forth by Hindu thinkers.

=== Christianity ===
As of 2006, most Christians around the world accepted evolution as the most likely explanation for the origins of species, and did not take a literal view of the Genesis creation-narrative; the United States was an exception: there, belief in religious fundamentalism was much more likely to affect attitudes towards evolution than it was for believers elsewhere. Political partisanship affecting religious belief may be a factor because political partisanship in the US is highly correlated with fundamentalist thinking, unlike in Europe.

Most contemporary Christian leaders and scholars from mainstream churches, such as Anglicans and Lutherans, do not see a conflict between the spiritual meaning of creation and the science of evolution. According to the former archbishop of Canterbury, Rowan Williams, "for most of the history of Christianity, and I think this is fair enough, most of the history of the [sic] Christianity there's been an awareness that a belief that everything depends on the creative act of God, is quite compatible with a degree of uncertainty or latitude about how precisely that unfolds in creative time."

Leaders of the Anglican and Roman Catholic (Note: See also the article Catholic Church and evolution.) churches have made statements in favor of evolutionary theory, as have scholars such as the physicist John Polkinghorne, who argues that evolution is one of the principles through which God created living beings. Earlier supporters of evolutionary theory include Frederick Temple (who became Archbishop of Canterbury), Asa Gray and the Reverend Charles Kingsley, who enthusiastically supported Darwin's theories upon their publication. The French Jesuit priest and geologist Pierre Teilhard de Chardin (1881-1955) saw evolution as confirmation of his Christian beliefs, despite condemnation from Church authorities for his more speculative theories. Another example is that of Liberal theology, not providing any creation models, but instead focusing on the symbolism in beliefs of the time of authoring Genesis and on its cultural environment.

Many Christians and Jews had been considering the idea of the biblical account of creation as an allegory (instead of historical) long before the development of Darwin's theory of evolution. For example, Philo c. 20 BCE – c. 50 CE),, whose works were taken up by early Church writers, wrote that it would be a mistake to think that creation happened in six days, or in any set amount of time. In the late fourth century Saint Augustine (formerly a neoplatonist), argued that everything in the universe was created by God at the same moment in time (and not in six days as a literal reading of the Book of Genesis would seem to require); It appears that both Philo and Augustine felt uncomfortable with the idea of a seven-day creation because it detracted from the notion of God's omnipotence.

In 1950, Pope Pius XII stated limited support for the idea of biological evolution in his encyclical Humani generis. In 1996, Pope John Paul II stated that "new knowledge has led to the recognition of the theory of evolution as more than a hypothesis", but, referring to previous papal writings, he concluded that "if the human body takes its origin from pre-existent living matter, the spiritual soul is immediately created by God".

In the US, Evangelical Christians have continued to believe in a literal Genesis. As of 2008, members of evangelical Protestant (70%), Mormon (76%) and Jehovah's Witnesses (90%) denominations were the most likely to reject the evolutionary interpretation of the origins of life.

Jehovah's Witnesses assert that scientific evidence about the age of the universe is compatible with the Bible, but that the 'days' recounted after Genesis 1:1 were each thousands of years in length. They view this belief as an alternative to Creationism rather than a variation of Creationism.

The historic Christian literal interpretation of the biblical account of creation requires the harmonization of two creation stories, Genesis 1:1–2:3 and Genesis 2:4–25, (Note: Other biblical passages vary emphasis and add detail: thus in Job 38, God, speaking in the first person, concentrates on assumed engineering/architectural preparations of the foundations of the earth, and sets the scene of the creation amongst apparently pre-existing stars and "all the sons of God": Job 38:4–7: "Where wast thou when I laid the foundations of the earth? declare, if thou hast understanding. Who hath laid the measures thereof, if thou knowest? or who hath stretched the line upon it? Whereupon are the foundations thereof fastened? or who laid the corner stone thereof; When the morning stars sang together, and all the sons of God shouted for joy?) for there to be a consistent interpretation. Creationists sometimes seek to ensure that their belief is taught in science classes, mainly in American schools. Opponents of creationism reject the claim that the literalistic biblical view meets the criteria required to be considered scientific. Many religious groups teach that God created the Cosmos. From the days of the early Christian Church Fathers theologians proposed allegorical interpretations of the Book of Genesis as well as literal readings.

Christian Science, a system of thought and practice derived from the writings of Mary Baker Eddy (1821-1910), interprets the Book of Genesis figuratively rather than literally. It regards the material world as an illusion, and consequently not created by God: the only real creation is the spiritual realm, of which the material world is a distorted version. Christian Scientists regard the story of the creation in the Book of Genesis as having symbolic rather than literal meaning. According to Christian Science, both creationism and evolution are false from an absolute or "spiritual" point of view, as they both proceed from a (false) belief in the reality of a material universe. However, Christian Scientists do not oppose the teaching of evolution in schools, nor do they demand the inclusion of alternative accounts in the syllabus: they believe that both material science and literalist theology are concerned with the illusory, mortal and material, rather than the real, immortal and spiritual. With regard to material theories of creation, Eddy showed a preference for Darwin's theory of evolution over others.

=== Hinduism ===
Hindu creationists claim that species of plants and animals are material forms adopted by pure consciousness which live an endless cycle of births and rebirths. Ronald Numbers says that: "Hindu Creationists have insisted on the antiquity of humans, who they believe appeared fully formed as long, perhaps, as trillions of years ago." Hindu creationism is a form of old Earth creationism, according to Hindu creationists the universe may even be older than billions of years. These views are based on the Vedas, the creation myths of which depict an extreme antiquity of the universe and history of the Earth.

In Hindu cosmology, time cyclically repeats general events of creation and destruction, with many "first man", each known as Manu, the progenitor of mankind. Each Manu successively reigns over a 306.72 million year period known as a manvantara, each ending with the destruction of mankind followed by a sandhya (period of non-activity) before the next manvantara. 120.53 million years have elapsed in the current manvantara (current mankind) according to calculations on Hindu units of time. The universe is cyclically created at the start and destroyed at the end of a kalpa (day of Brahma), lasting for 4.32 billion years, which is followed by a pralaya (period of dissolution) of equal length. 1.97 billion years have elapsed in the current kalpa (current universe). The universal elements or building blocks (unmanifest matter) exists for a period known as a maha-kalpa, lasting for 311.04 trillion years, which is followed by a maha-pralaya (period of great dissolution) of equal length. 155.52 trillion years have elapsed in the current maha-kalpa.

=== Islam ===
The creation myths in the Quran are more vague and allow for a wider range of interpretations similar to those in other Abrahamic religions.

Islam also has its own school of theistic evolutionism, which holds that mainstream scientific analysis of the origin of the universe is supported by the Quran. Some Muslims believe in evolutionary creation, especially among liberal movements within Islam.

Writing for The Boston Globe, Drake Bennett noted: "Without a Book of Genesis to account for [...] Muslim creationists have little interest in proving that the age of the Earth is measured in the thousands rather than the billions of years, nor do they show much interest in the problem of the dinosaurs. And the idea that animals might evolve into other animals also tends to be less controversial, in part because there are passages of the Koran that seem to support it. But the issue of whether human beings are the product of evolution is just as fraught among Muslims." Khalid Anees, president of the Islamic Society of Britain, states that Muslims do not agree that one species can develop from another.

Ottoman-Lebanese Sunni scholar Hussein al-Jisr, declared that there is no contradiction between evolution and the Islamic scriptures. He stated that "there is no evidence in the Quran to suggest whether all species, each of which exists by the grace of God, were created all at once or gradually", and referred to the aforementioned story of creation in Sūrat al-Anbiyā. In Kemalist Turkey, important scholars strove to accommodate the theory of evolution in Islamic scripture during the first decades of the Turkish Republic; their approach to the theory defended Islamic belief in the face of scientific theories of their times.

The Saudi Arabian government, on the other hand, began funding and promoting denial of evolution in the 1970s in accordance to its Salafi-Wahhabi interpretation of Islam. This stance garnered criticism from the governments and academics of mainline Muslim countries such as Turkey, Pakistan, Lebanon, and Iran, where evolution was initially taught and promoted. Since the 1980s, Turkey has been a site of strong advocacy for creationism, supported by American adherents.

=== Judaism ===
For Orthodox Jews who seek to reconcile discrepancies between science and the creation myths in the Bible, the notion that science and the Bible should even be reconciled through traditional scientific means is questioned. To these groups, science is as true as the Torah and if there seems to be a problem, epistemological limits are to blame for apparently irreconcilable points. They point to discrepancies between what is expected and what actually is to demonstrate that things are not always as they appear. They note that even the root word for 'world' in the Hebrew language, עולם, Olam, means 'hidden' (נעלם, Neh-Eh-Lahm). Just as they know from the Torah that God created man and trees and the light on its way from the stars in their observed state, so too can they know that the world was created in its over the six days of Creation that reflects progression to its currently-observed state, with the understanding that physical ways to verify this may eventually be identified. This knowledge has been advanced by Rabbi Dovid Gottlieb, former philosophy professor at Johns Hopkins University.

Kabbalistic sources from well before the scientifically apparent age of the universe was first determined are also in close concord with modern scientific estimates of the age of the universe, according to Rabbi Aryeh Kaplan, and based on Sefer Temunah, an early kabbalistic work attributed to the first-century Tanna Nehunya ben HaKanah. Many kabbalists accepted the teachings of the Sefer HaTemunah, including the medieval Jewish scholar Nahmanides, his close student Isaac ben Samuel of Acre, and David ben Solomon ibn Abi Zimra. Other parallels are derived, among other sources, from Nahmanides, who expounds that there was a Neanderthal-like species with which Adam mated (he did this long before Neanderthals had even been discovered scientifically). Reform Judaism does not take the Torah as a literal text, but rather as a symbolic or open-ended work.

Some contemporary writers such as Rabbi Gedalyah Nadel have sought to reconcile the discrepancy between the account in the Torah, and scientific findings by arguing that each day referred to in the Bible was not 24 hours, but billions of years long. Others claim that the Earth was created a few thousand years ago, but was deliberately made to look as if it was five billion years old, e.g. by being created with ready made fossils. The best known exponent of this approach being Rabbi Menachem Mendel Schneerson. Others state that although the world was physically created in six 24-hour days, the Torah accounts can be interpreted to mean that there was a period of billions of years before the six days of creation.

=== Native American ===
There have been multiple prominent cases of Native Americans rejecting the scientific consensus on the age of the Earth and of the peopling of the Americas in favor of beliefs based on traditional Native American mythology, with the most famous example being Vine Deloria Jr. in his book Red Earth, White Lies.

== Prevalence ==
Views on human evolution in various countries 2008

Most vocal literalist creationists are from the US, and strict creationist views are much less common in other developed countries. According to a study published in Science, a survey of the US, Turkey, Japan and Europe showed that public acceptance of evolution is most prevalent in Iceland, Denmark and Sweden at 80% of the population. There seems to be no significant correlation between believing in evolution and understanding evolutionary science.

=== Australia ===
A 2009 Nielsen poll showed that 23% of Australians believe "the biblical account of human origins," 42% believe in a "wholly scientific" explanation for the origins of life, while 32% believe in an evolutionary process "guided by God".

A 2013 survey conducted by Auspoll and the Australian Academy of Science found that 80% of Australians believe in evolution (70% believe it is currently occurring, 10% believe in evolution but do not think it is currently occurring), 12% were not sure and 9% stated they do not believe in evolution.

=== Brazil ===
A 2011 Ipsos survey found that 47% of responders in Brazil identified themselves as "creationists and believe that human beings were in fact created by a spiritual force such as the God they believe in and do not believe that the origin of man came from evolving from other species such as apes".

In 2004, IBOPE conducted a poll in Brazil that asked questions about creationism and the teaching of creationism in schools. When asked if creationism should be taught in schools, 89% of people said that creationism should be taught in schools. When asked if the teaching of creationism should replace the teaching of evolution in schools, 75% of people said that the teaching of creationism should replace the teaching of evolution in schools.

=== Canada ===
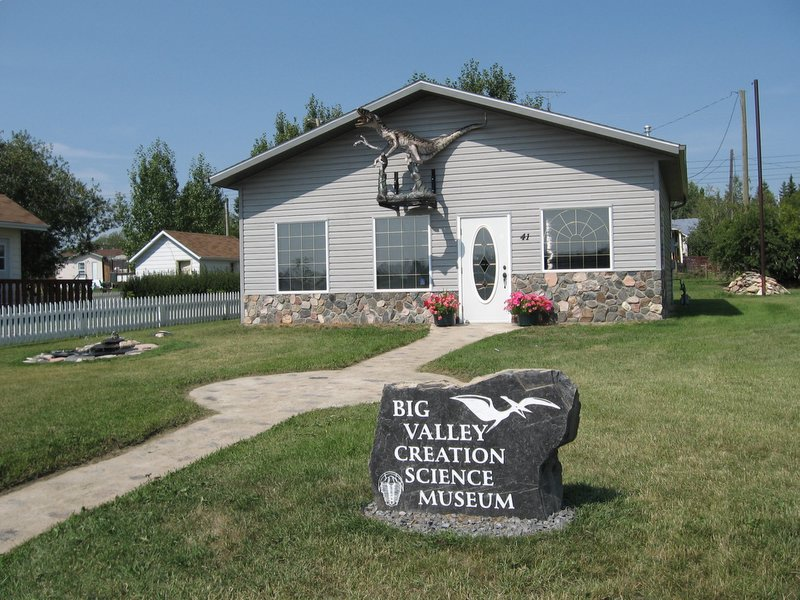
Big Valley Creation Science Museum in Big Valley, Alberta, Canada

A 2012 survey, by Angus Reid Public Opinion revealed that 61 percent of Canadians believe in evolution. The poll asked "Where did human beings come from – did we start as singular cells millions of year ago and evolve into our present form, or did God create us in his image 10,000 years ago?"

In 2019, a Research Co. poll asked people in Canada if creationism "should be part of the school curriculum in their province". 38% of Canadians said that creationism should be part of the school curriculum, 39% of Canadians said that it should not be part of the school curriculum, and 23% of Canadians were undecided.

In 2023, a Research Co. poll found that 21% of Canadians "believe God created human beings in their present form within the last 10,000 years". The poll also found that "More than two-in-five Canadians (43%) think creationism should be part of the school curriculum in their province."

=== Europe ===
In Europe, literalist creationism is more widely rejected, though regular opinion polls are not available. Most people accept that evolution is the most widely accepted scientific theory as taught in most schools. In countries with a Roman Catholic majority, papal acceptance of evolutionary creationism as worthy of study has essentially ended debate on the matter for many people.

In the UK, a 2006 poll on the "origin and development of life", asked participants to choose between three different perspectives on the origin of life: 22% chose creationism, 17% opted for intelligent design, 48% selected evolutionary theory, and the rest did not know. A subsequent 2010 YouGov poll on the correct explanation for the origin of humans found that 9% opted for creationism, 12% intelligent design, 65% evolutionary theory and 13% didn't know. The former Archbishop of Canterbury Rowan Williams, head of the worldwide Anglican Communion, views the idea of teaching creationism in schools as a mistake. In 2009, an Ipsos Mori survey in the United Kingdom found that 54% of Britons agreed with the view: "Evolutionary theories should be taught in science lessons in schools together with other possible perspectives, such as intelligent design and creationism."

In Italy, Education Minister Letizia Moratti wanted to retire evolution from the secondary school level; after one week of massive protests, she reversed her opinion.

There continues to be scattered and possibly mounting efforts on the part of religious groups throughout Europe to introduce creationism into public education. In response, the Parliamentary Assembly of the Council of Europe has released a draft report titled The dangers of creationism in education on June 8, 2007, reinforced by a further proposal of banning it in schools dated October 4, 2007.

Serbia suspended the teaching of evolution for one week in September 2004, under education minister Ljiljana Čolić, only allowing schools to reintroduce evolution into the curriculum if they also taught creationism. "After a deluge of protest from scientists, teachers and opposition parties" says the BBC report, Čolić's deputy made the statement, "I have come here to confirm Charles Darwin is still alive" and announced that the decision was reversed. Čolić resigned after the government said that she had caused "problems that had started to reflect on the work of the entire government."

Poland saw a major controversy over creationism in 2006, when the Deputy Education Minister, Mirosław Orzechowski, denounced evolution as "one of many lies" taught in Polish schools. His superior, Minister of Education Roman Giertych, has stated that the theory of evolution would continue to be taught in Polish schools, "as long as most scientists in our country say that it is the right theory." Giertych's father, Member of the European Parliament Maciej Giertych, has opposed the teaching of evolution and has claimed that dinosaurs and humans co-existed.

A June 2015 – July 2016 Pew poll of Eastern European countries, found that 56% of people from Armenia say that humans and other living things have "Existed in present state since the beginning of time". Armenia is followed by 52% from Bosnia, 42% from Moldova, 37% from Lithuania, 34% from Georgia and Ukraine, 33% from Croatia and Romania, 31% from Bulgaria, 29% from Greece and Serbia, 26% from Russia, 25% from Latvia, 23% from Belarus and Poland, 21% from Estonia and Hungary, and 16% from the Czech Republic.

=== South Africa ===
A 2011 Ipsos survey found that 56% of responders in South Africa identified themselves as "creationists and believe that human beings were in fact created by a spiritual force such as the God they believe in and do not believe that the origin of man came from evolving from other species such as apes".

=== South Korea ===
In 2009, an EBS survey in South Korea found that 63% of people believed that creation and evolution should both be taught in schools simultaneously.

=== United States ===
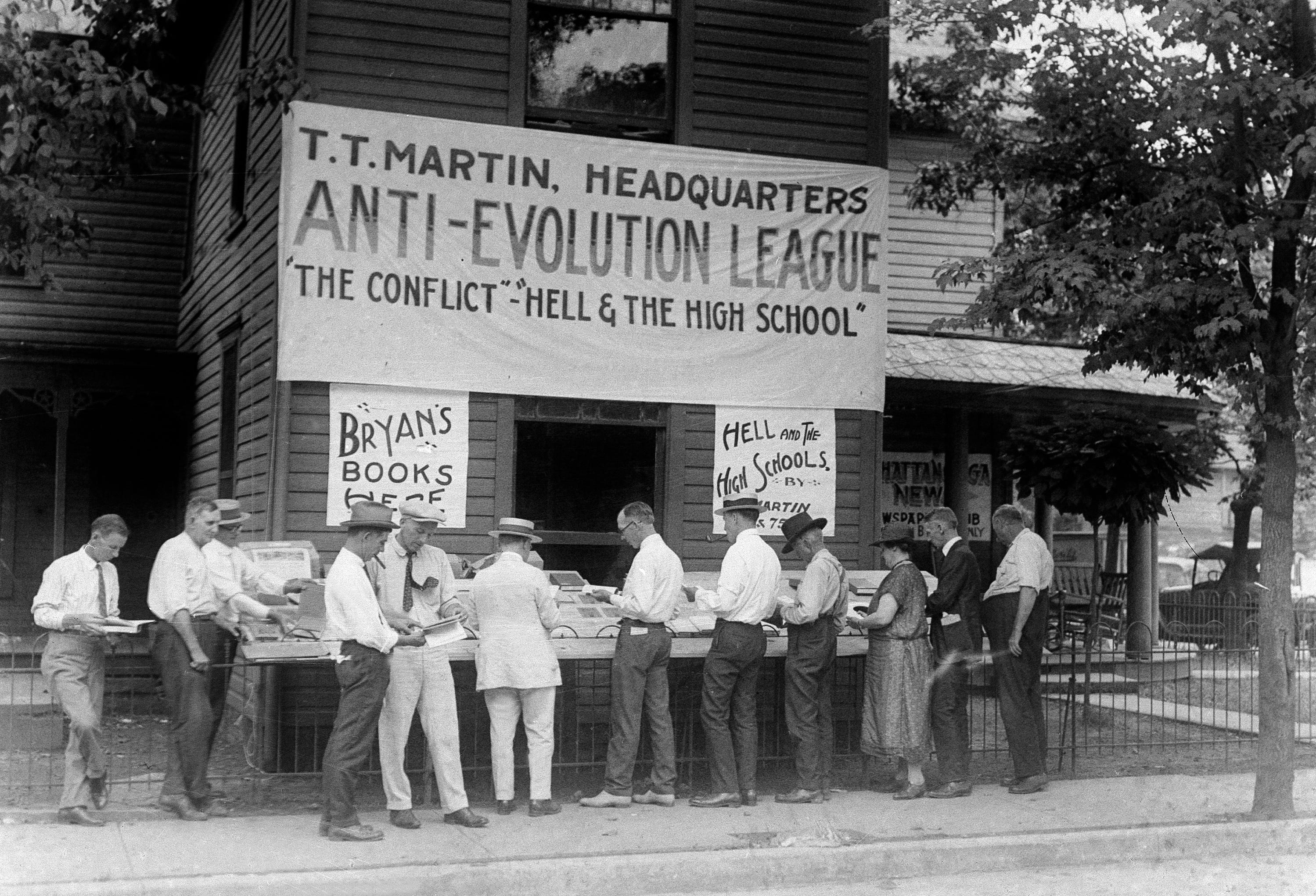
Anti-Evolution League, at the Scopes Trial, Dayton, Tennessee, July 25, 1925

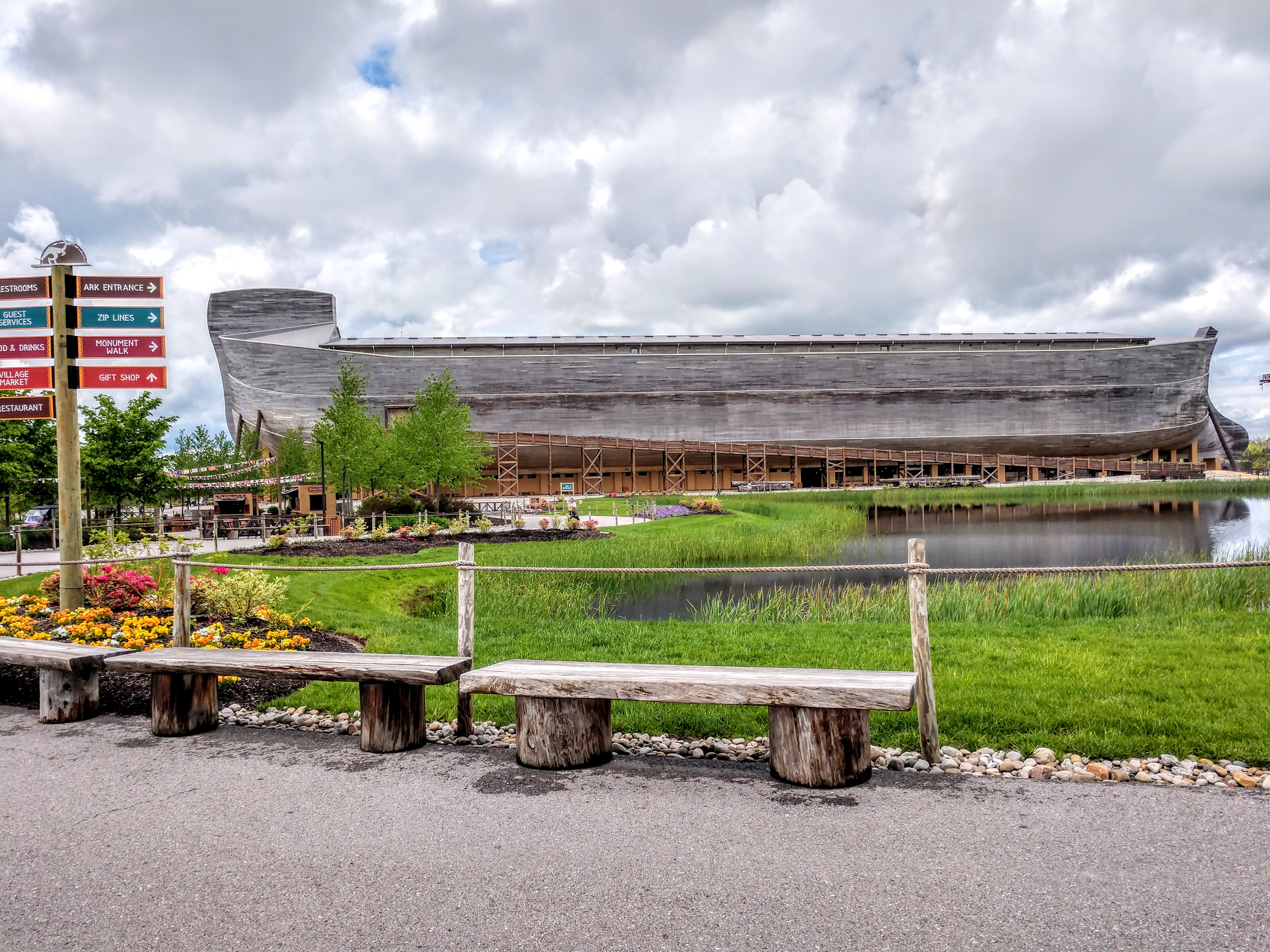
The Ark Encounter theme park in Williamstown, Kentucky, United States

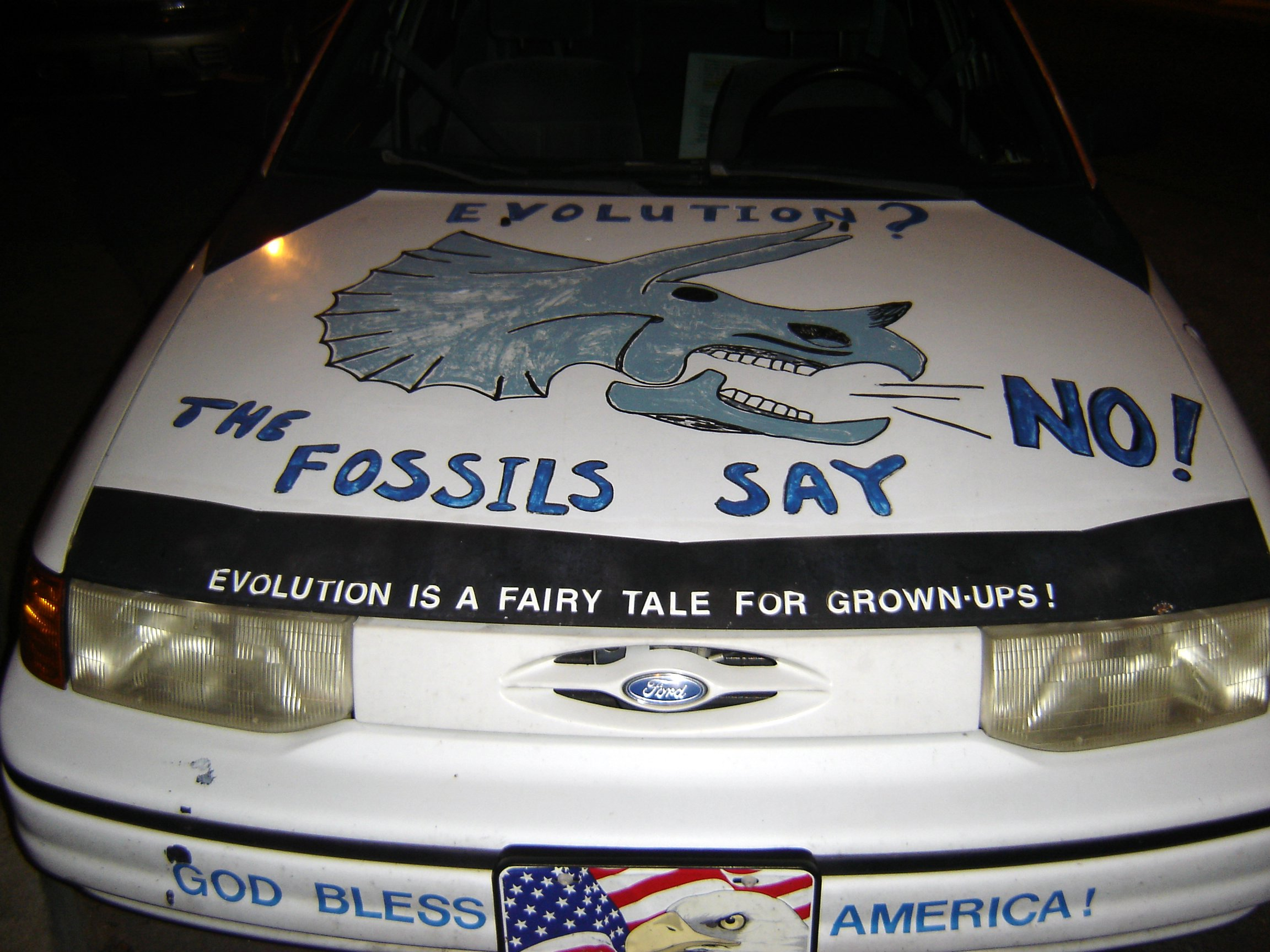
Anti-evolution car in Athens, Georgia

A 2017 poll by Pew Research found that 62% of Americans believe humans have evolved over time and 34% of Americans believe humans and other living things have existed in their present form since the beginning of time. A 2019 Gallup creationism survey found that 40% of adults in the United States inclined to the view that "God created humans in their present form at one time within the last 10,000 years" when asked for their views on the origin and development of human beings.

According to a 2014 Gallup poll, about 42% of Americans believe that "God created human beings pretty much in their present form at one time within the last 10,000 years or so." Another 31% believe that "human beings have developed over millions of years from less advanced forms of life, but God guided this process,"and 19% believe that "human beings have developed over millions of years from less advanced forms of life, but God had no part in this process."

Belief in creationism is inversely correlated to education; of those with postgraduate degrees, 74% accept evolution. In 1987, Newsweek reported: "By one count there are some 700 scientists with respectable academic credentials (out of a total of 480,000 U.S. earth and life scientists) who give credence to creation-science, the general theory that complex life forms did not evolve but appeared 'abruptly.'"

A 2000 poll for People for the American Way found 70% of the US public felt that evolution was compatible with a belief in God.

According to a study published in Science, between 1985 and 2005 the number of adult North Americans who accept evolution declined from 45% to 40%, the number of adults who reject evolution declined from 48% to 39% and the number of people who were unsure increased from 7% to 21%. Besides the US the study also compared data from 32 European countries, Turkey, and Japan. The only country where acceptance of evolution was lower than in the US was Turkey (25%).

According to a 2011 Fox News poll, 45% of Americans believe in creationism, down from 50% in a similar poll in 1999. 21% believe in 'the theory of evolution as outlined by Darwin and other scientists' (up from 15% in 1999), and 27% answered that both are true (up from 26% in 1999).

In September 2012, educator and television personality Bill Nye spoke with the Associated Press and aired his fears about acceptance of creationism, believing that teaching children that creationism is the only true answer without letting them understand the way science works will prevent any future innovation in the world of science. In February 2014, Nye defended evolution in the classroom in a debate with creationist Ken Ham on the topic of whether creation is a viable model of origins in today's modern, scientific era.

==== Education controversies ====
The Truth fish, one of the many creationist responses to the Darwin fish

In the US, creationism has become centered in the political controversy over creation and evolution in public education, and whether teaching creationism in science classes conflicts with the separation of church and state. Currently, the controversy comes in the form of whether advocates of the intelligent design movement who wish to "Teach the Controversy" in science classes have conflated science with religion.

People for the American Way polled 1500 North Americans about the teaching of evolution and creationism in November and December 1999. They found that most North Americans were not familiar with creationism, and most North Americans had heard of evolution, but many did not fully understand the basics of the theory. The main findings were:

Americans believe that:
Public schools should teach evolution only	20%
Only evolution should be taught in science classes, religious explanations can be discussed in another class	17%
Creationism can be discussed in science class as a 'belief,' not a scientific theory	29%
Creationism and evolution should be taught as 'scientific theories' in science class	13%
Only Creationism should be taught	16%
Teach both evolution and Creationism, but unsure how to do so	4%
No opinion	1%

In such political contexts, creationists argue that their particular religiously based origin belief is superior to those of other belief systems, in particular those made through secular or scientific rationale. Political creationists are opposed by many individuals and organizations who have made detailed critiques and given testimony in various court cases that the alternatives to scientific reasoning offered by creationists are opposed by the consensus of the scientific community.

== Criticism ==
=== Christian criticism ===
Most Christians disagree with the teaching of creationism as an alternative to evolution in schools. Several religious organizations, among them the Catholic Church, hold that their faith does not conflict with the scientific consensus regarding evolution. The Clergy Letter Project, which has collected more than 13,000 signatures, is an "endeavor designed to demonstrate that religion and science can be compatible."

In his 2002 article "Intelligent Design as a Theological Problem", George Murphy argues against the view that life on Earth, in all its forms, is direct evidence of God's act of creation (Murphy quotes Phillip E. Johnson's claim that he is speaking "of a God who acted openly and left his fingerprints on all the evidence."). Murphy argues that this view of God is incompatible with the Christian understanding of God as "the one revealed in the cross and resurrection of Christ." The basis of this theology is Isaiah 45:15, "Verily thou art a God that hidest thyself, O God of Israel, the Saviour."

Murphy observes that the execution of a Jewish carpenter by Roman authorities is in and of itself an ordinary event and did not require divine action. On the contrary, for the crucifixion to occur, God had to limit or "empty" himself. It was for this reason that Paul the Apostle wrote, in Philippians 2:5-8:

Let this mind be in you, which was also in Christ Jesus: Who, being in the form of God, thought it not robbery to be equal with God: But made himself of no reputation, and took upon him the form of a servant, and was made in the likeness of men: And being found in fashion as a man, he humbled himself, and became obedient unto death, even the death of the cross.

Murphy concludes that,

Just as the Son of God limited himself by taking human form and dying on a cross, God limits divine action in the world to be in accord with rational laws which God has chosen. This enables us to understand the world on its own terms, but it also means that natural processes hide God from scientific observation.

For Murphy, a theology of the cross requires that Christians accept a methodological naturalism, meaning that one cannot invoke God to explain natural phenomena, while recognizing that such acceptance does not require one to accept a metaphysical naturalism, which proposes that nature is all that there is.

The Jesuit priest George Coyne has stated that it is "unfortunate that, especially here in America, creationism has come to mean...some literal interpretation of Genesis." He argues that "...Judaic-Christian faith is radically creationist, but in a totally different sense. It is rooted in belief that everything depends on God, or better, all is a gift from God."

=== Teaching of creationism ===
Other Christians have expressed qualms about teaching creationism. In March 2006, then Archbishop of Canterbury Rowan Williams, the leader of the world's Anglicans, stated his discomfort about teaching creationism, saying that creationism was "a kind of category mistake, as if the Bible were a theory like other theories." He also said: "My worry is creationism can end up reducing the doctrine of creation rather than enhancing it." The views of the Episcopal Church – a major American-based branch of the Anglican Communion – on teaching creationism resemble those of Williams.

The National Science Teachers Association is opposed to teaching creationism as a science, as is the Association for Science Teacher Education, the National Association of Biology Teachers, the American Anthropological Association, the American Geosciences Institute, the Geological Society of America, the American Geophysical Union, and numerous other professional teaching and scientific societies.

In April 2010, the American Academy of Religion issued Guidelines for Teaching About Religion in K‐12 Public Schools in the United States, which included guidance that creation science or intelligent design should not be taught in science classes, as "Creation science and intelligent design represent worldviews that fall outside of the realm of science that is defined as (and limited to) a method of inquiry based on gathering observable and measurable evidence subject to specific principles of reasoning." However, they, as well as other "worldviews that focus on speculation regarding the origins of life represent another important and relevant form of human inquiry that is appropriately studied in literature or social sciences courses. Such study, however, must include a diversity of worldviews representing a variety of religious and philosophical perspectives and must avoid privileging one view as more legitimate than others."

Randy Moore and Sehoya Cotner, from the biology program at the University of Minnesota, reflect on the relevance of teaching creationism in the article "The Creationist Down the Hall: Does It Matter When Teachers Teach Creationism?", in which they write: "Despite decades of science education reform, numerous legal decisions declaring the teaching of creationism in public-school science classes to be unconstitutional, overwhelming evidence supporting evolution, and the many denunciations of creationism as nonscientific by professional scientific societies, creationism remains popular throughout the United States."

=== Scientific criticism ===
Science is a system of knowledge based on observation, empirical evidence, and the development of theories that yield testable explanations and predictions of natural phenomena. By contrast, creationism is often based on literal interpretations of the narratives of particular religious texts. Creationist beliefs involve purported forces that lie outside of nature, such as supernatural intervention, and often do not allow predictions at all. Therefore, these can neither be confirmed nor disproved by scientists. However, many creationist beliefs can be framed as testable predictions about phenomena such as the age of the Earth, its geological history and the origins, distributions and relationships of living organisms found on it. Early science incorporated elements of these beliefs, but as science developed, these beliefs were gradually falsified and were replaced with understandings based on accumulated and reproducible evidence that often allows the accurate prediction of future results.

Some scientists, such as Stephen Jay Gould, consider science and religion to be two compatible and complementary fields, with authorities in distinct areas of human experience, so-called non-overlapping magisteria. This view is also held by many theologians, who believe that ultimate origins and meaning are addressed by religion, but favor verifiable scientific explanations of natural phenomena over those of creationist beliefs. Other scientists, such as Richard Dawkins, reject the non-overlapping magisteria and argue that, in disproving literal interpretations of creationists, the scientific method also undermines religious texts as a source of truth. Irrespective of this diversity in viewpoints, since creationist beliefs are not supported by empirical evidence, the scientific consensus is that any attempt to teach creationism as science should be rejected.

== Organizations ==
Creationism (in general)

- American Scientific Affiliation
- Christians in Science

Young Earth creationism

- Answers in Genesis, a group promoting young Earth creationism
- Creation Ministries International, an organisation promoting biblical creation
- Creation Research Society
- Institute for Creation Research
- The Way of the Master

Old Earth creationism

- Old Earth Ministries (OEM), formerly Answers In Creation (AIC), led by Greg Neyman
- Reasons to Believe, led by Hugh Ross

Intelligent design

- Access Research Network
- Centre for Intelligent Design
- Center for Science and Culture, a subsidiary of the Discovery Institute

Evolutionary creationism

- BioLogos Foundation

== See also ==
- Biblical inerrancy
- Biogenesis
- Cognitive dissonance
- Council of Europe Parliamentary Assembly Resolution 1580 (2007)
- Evolution of complexity
- Flying Spaghetti Monster
- History of creationism
- Religious cosmology
