= Old Earth creationism =

Form of creationism

Old Earth creationism (OEC) is an umbrella of unscientific and non factual theological views encompassing certain varieties of creationism which may or can include day-age creationism, gap creationism, progressive creationism, and sometimes theistic evolution.

Broadly speaking, OEC usually occupies a middle ground between young Earth creationism (YEC) and theistic evolution (TE). In contrast to YEC, it is typically more compatible with the scientific consensus on the issues of physics, chemistry, geology, and the age of the Earth. However, like YEC and in contrast with TE, some forms of it reject macroevolution, claiming it is biologically untenable and not supported by the fossil record, and the concept of universal descent from a last universal common ancestor.

For a long time Evangelical creationists generally subscribed to old Earth creationism until 1960 when John C. Whitcomb and Henry M. Morris published the book The Genesis Flood, which caused the Young Earth creationist view to become prominent.

== History ==
Augustine postulated an instantaneous creation and interpreted the six stages or phases (six "yom" in the original Hebrew texts, translated as "days" (Note: A day is the period of time it takes for the Earth to complete one revolution on its axis (approximately 24 hours). However, in the first creation story the Earth is not created until the third stage of the process. The Earth therefore did not exist for the first two stages, so the concept of a day did not exist for the first two stages.) in English) allegorically, and his views also influenced Gregory the Great, Bede and Isidore of Seville. Augustine was not alone in viewing the "days" of Genesis as allegorical; others with similar views include Didymus the Blind, possibly Basil the Great, Clement of Alexandria, Origen and Athanasius. However, they should not be understood as rejecting the literal interpretation, which patristic commentators believed could stand side by side with the allegorical.

Cyprian argued that each of the phases ("days") of Genesis symbolically represented 1,000 years of the world's history, believing the world would endure for 7,000 years. Irenaeus and Justin Martyr also suggested that the "days" of Genesis could prefigure 6,000 years of earth history, quoting Psalm 90:4 and perhaps 2 Peter.

According to Hugh Ross, Thomas Aquinas supposedly denied the Genesis account as being literal with six 24 hour days. However, according to Answers in Genesis, Aquinas agreed with the six 24 hour day interpretation, as well as a number of other early church fathers who were cited by Ross.

Thomas Chalmers popularized gap creationism, which is a form of old Earth creationism. Additionally it was advocated by the Scofield Reference bible, which caused the theory to survive longer.

Probably the most famous day-age creationist was American politician, anti-evolution campaigner and Scopes Trial prosecutor William Jennings Bryan. Unlike many of his conservative followers, Bryan was not a strict biblical literalist, and had no objection to "evolution before man but for the fact that a concession as to the truth of evolution up to man furnishes our opponents with an argument which they are quick to use, namely, if evolution accounts for all the species up to man, does it not raise a presumption in behalf of evolution to include man?" He considered defining the "days" in Genesis 1 to be twenty-four hours to be a pro-evolution straw man argument to make attacking creationists easier, and admitted under questioning at the Scopes trial that the world was far older than six thousand years, and that the "days" of creation were probably longer than twenty-four hours each.

American Baptist preacher and anti-evolution campaigner William Bell Riley, "The Grand Old Man of Fundamentalism," founder of the World Christian Fundamentals Association and of the Anti-Evolution League of America, was another prominent day-age creationist in the first half of the 20th century, who defended this position in a famous debate with friend and prominent young Earth creationist Harry Rimmer.

== Types ==
=== Gap creationism ===
Gap creationism is a form of old Earth creationism which posits the belief that the six-yom creation period, as described in the Book of Genesis, involved six literal 24-hour days, but that there was a gap of time between two distinct creations in the first and second verses of Genesis, which the theory states explains many scientific observations, including the age of the Earth. This view was popularized in 1909 by the Scofield Reference Bible.

=== Progressive creationism ===
Progressive creationism is the religious belief that God created new forms of life gradually over a period of hundreds of millions of years. As a form of Old Earth creationism, it accepts mainstream geological and cosmological estimates for the age of the Earth and age of the Universe, some tenets of biology such as microevolution as well as archaeology to make its case. In this view creation occurred in rapid bursts in which all "kinds" of plants and animals appear in stages lasting millions of years. The bursts are followed by periods of stasis or equilibrium to accommodate new arrivals. These bursts represent instances of God creating new types of organisms by divine intervention. As viewed from the archaeological record, progressive creationism holds that "species do not gradually appear by the steady transformation of its ancestors; [but] appear all at once and "fully formed." Thus the evidence for macroevolution is claimed to be false, but microevolution is accepted as a genetic parameter designed by the Creator into the fabric of genetics to allow for environmental adaptations and survival. Generally, it is viewed by proponents as a middle ground between literal creationism and evolution.

== Approaches to Genesis 1 ==
Old Earth Christian creationists may approach the creation accounts of Genesis in a number of different ways.

=== Framework interpretation ===
Summary of the Genesis 6-"day" creation account, showing the pattern according to the framework hypothesis.
"Days" of creation	"Days" of creation
"Day" 1: Light; day and night	"Day" 4: Sun, moon and stars
"Day" 2: Sea and heavens	"Day" 5: Sea creatures; birds
"Day" 3: Land and vegetation	"Day" 6: Land creatures; man

The framework interpretation (or framework hypothesis) notes that there is a pattern or "framework" present in the Genesis account and that, because of this, the account may not have been intended as a strict chronological record of creation. Instead, the creative events may be presented in a topical order. This view is broad enough that proponents of other old earth views (such as many Day-Age creationists) have no problem with many of the key points put forward by the hypothesis, though they might believe that there is a certain degree of chronology present.

=== Day-age creationism ===
Day-age creationism is an effort to reconcile the literal Genesis account of creation with modern scientific theories on the age of the universe, the Earth, life, and humans. It holds that the six stages or phases (six "yom" in the original Hebrew texts, translated as six "days" in English) referred to in the Genesis account of creation are not ordinary 24-hour days, but rather are much longer periods (of thousands or millions of years). The Genesis account is then interpreted as an account of the process of cosmic evolution, providing a broad base on which any number of theories and interpretations are built. Proponents of the day-age theory can be found among theistic evolutionists and progressive creationists.

The day-age theory tries to reconcile these views by arguing that the creation "days" were not ordinary 24-hour days, but actually lasted for long periods of time—or as the theory's name implies: the "days" each lasted an age. Most advocates of old Earth creationism hold that the six "days" referred to in the creation account given in Genesis are not ordinary 24-hour days, as the word used in the original Hebrew texts, yom, can be interpreted in this context to mean a long period of time (thousands or millions of years) rather than a 24-hour day. According to this view, the sequence and duration of the creation "days" is representative or symbolic of the sequence and duration of events that scientists theorize to have happened, such that Genesis can be read as a summary of modern science, simplified for the benefit of pre-scientific humans.

=== Cosmic time ===
Gerald Schroeder puts forth a view which reconciles 24-hour creation days with an age of billions of years for the universe by noting, as creationist Phillip E. Johnson summarizes in his article "What Would Newton Do?": "the Bible speaks of time from the viewpoint of the universe as a whole, which Schroeder interprets to mean at the moment of 'quark confinement,' when stable matter formed from energy early in the first second of the big bang." Schroeder calculates that a period of six days under the conditions of quark confinement, when the universe was approximately a trillion times smaller and hotter than it is today is equal to fifteen billion years of earth time today. This is all due to space expansion after quark confinement. Thus Genesis and modern physics are reconciled. Schroeder, though, states in an earlier book, Genesis and the Big Bang, that the Earth and solar system is some "4.5 to 5 billion years" old and also states in a later book, The Science of God, that the Sun is 4.6 billion years old.

== The biblical flood ==
Some old Earth creationists reject flood geology, a position which leaves them open to accusations that they thereby reject the infallibility of scripture (which states that the Genesis flood covered the whole of the earth). In response, old Earth creationists cite verses in the Bible where the words "whole" and "all" clearly require a contextual interpretation. Old Earth creationists generally believe that the human race was localised around the Middle East at the time of the Genesis flood, a position which is in conflict with the Out of Africa theory.

== See also ==
- Biblical cosmology
- Cosmogony
- Creation science
- Dating creation
- Directed panspermia
- Hindu creationism
- Jain cosmology#Time cycle
- Kalpa (time)
- Omphalos hypothesis
- Pre-Adamite
- Timeline of epochs in cosmology
- Yuga Cycle

== Sources ==
- Numbers, Ronald (2006). The Creationists: From Scientific Creationism to Intelligent Design. Harvard University Press. p. 578. ISBN 978-0-674-02339-0.
