= Council of Europe Parliamentary Assembly Resolution 1580 (2007) =

Council of Europe Parliamentary Assembly (PACE) Resolution 1580 (2007), titled "The dangers of creationism in education", is a resolution adopted by the Parliamentary Assembly of the Council of Europe on 4 October 2007, in addition to a report of the same name.

== History of adoption ==
The process of drafting the resolution began in 2006, when a group of the PACE delegates led by the British Labour Party's Andrew McIntosh submitted a draft recommendation of the same name for consideration.

The report was made by a French socialist delegate Guy Lengagne. His report, which included resolution draft was returned by the Assembly to the Committee on Culture, Science and Education for revision on the initiative of the Flemish leader of the Christian Democrats group in PACE Luc Van den Brande by 63 votes to 46. Committee on Culture, Science and Education protested against the procedure by which the report was returned for revision.

The report was redrafted by another reporter, Luxembourgish ALDE delegate Anne Brasseur and after some amendments the resolution was approved by the Assembly by 48 votes to 25.

== The resolution ==
The resolution states that "creationism cannot lay claim to being a scientific discipline" (para. 4) and refers to "intelligent design" as creationism (para. 8). At the same time, the resolution considers it acceptable to present creationist ideas as a supplement to cultural and religious education (para. 16).

The part of the resolution calling for action reads as follows:

19. The Parliamentary Assembly therefore urges the member states, and especially their education authorities to:

19.1. defend and promote scientific knowledge;

19.2. strengthen the teaching of the foundations of science, its history, its epistemology and its methods alongside the teaching of objective scientific knowledge;

19.3. make science more comprehensible, more attractive and closer to the realities of the contemporary world;

19.4. firmly oppose the teaching of creationism as a scientific discipline on an equal footing with the theory of evolution and in general the presentation of creationist ideas in any discipline other than religion;

19.5. promote the teaching of evolution as a fundamental scientific theory in the school curriculums.

== Reaction ==
After the rejection of Lengagne's report, the former rapporteur was interviewed on the subject by the French newspaper 20 Minutes, where he evaluated the events as follows: "We are witnessing a return to the Middle Ages."

The resolution was criticised by deputy head of the Department for External Church Relations of the Russian Orthodox Church, Archpriest Vsevolod Chaplin, stating that "those few fossils presented by the anthropologists as examples of ape-human transitional forms could be explained by random mutations. We don't claim to found a new species upon finding a fish with two heads." and by the president of Southern Baptist Theological Seminary Albert Mohler considering that "this can only mean that Europe (at least as represented by the Council of Europe) has forgotten even its Christian memory."

In February 2009, the resolution was a starting point of a conference held in Dortmund, Germany, and led by Dittmar Graf from the Technical University of Dortmund. The conference, including participation of Anne Brasseur, among others, was held in cooperation with the Max Planck Institute for Molecular Physiology, University of Vienna and Hacettepe University and with support from German Ministry of Education and Research.

Michael Poole, a King's College London Visiting Research Fellow in Science and Religion and a founding member of the International Society for Science and Religion, criticised the resolution for being too restrictive while disapproving of young Earth creationism and the intelligent design movement.

Deutsche Welle, covering the disagreement among members of the Assembly on whether the resolution constituted an attack on religious beliefs, and Die Welt, pointing to journalists-expressed suspicions of wishing to limit freedom of conscience and Brasseur's response that the aim was to draw a line between the spheres of faith and science.
