= Created kind =

Supposed original forms of life created by God

In creationism, a religious view based on a literal reading of the Book of Genesis and other biblical texts, created kinds are purported to be the original forms of life as they were created by God. They are also referred to in creationist literature as kinds, original kinds, Genesis kinds, and baramins (baramin is a neologism coined by combining the Hebrew words bará (בָּרָא, 'created') and min (מִין, 'kind')). (Note: The Hebrew words were combined in a grammatically incorrect way by Frank Lewis Marsh: the verb form bará actually means 'he [e.g. God] created', and the correct Hebrew for '[a] created kind' would be min baru.)

The idea is promulgated by Young Earth creationists and biblical literalists to support their belief in the literal truth of the Genesis creation narrative and the Genesis flood narrative during which, they contend, the ancestors of all land-based life on Earth were housed in Noah's Ark. Old Earth creationists also employ the concept, rejecting the idea of universal common descent while not necessarily accepting a literal interpretation of a global flood or a six-day creation in the last ten thousand years. Both groups accept that some lower-level microevolutionary change occurs within the biblically created kinds.

Creationists believe that not all creatures on Earth are genealogically related, and that living organisms were created by God in a finite number of discrete forms with genetic boundaries to prevent interbreeding. This viewpoint claims that the created kinds or baramins are genealogically discrete and are incapable of interbreeding and have no evolutionary (i.e., higher-level macroevolutionary) relationship to one another.

== Definitions ==
The concept of the "kind" originates from a literal reading of Genesis 1:12–24:

And God said, let the earth bring forth grass, the herb yielding seed, and the fruit tree yielding fruit after his kind [...] And God created great whales and every living creature that moveth, which the waters brought forth abundantly after their kind, and every winged fowl after his kind [...] And God said, let the earth bring forth the living creature after his kind, cattle and creeping thing, and beast of the earth after his kind, and it was so.

— Genesis 1:12–24, King James Version

There is some uncertainty about what exactly the Bible means when it talks of "kinds". Creationist Brian Nelson claimed "While the Bible allows that new varieties may have arisen since the creative days, it denies that any new species have arisen." However, Russell Mixter, another creationist writer, said that "One should not insist that "kind" means species. The word "kind" as used in the Bible may apply to any animal which may be distinguished in any way from another, or it may be applied to a large group of species distinguishable from another group [...] there is plenty of room for differences of opinion on what are the kinds of Genesis."

Frank Lewis Marsh coined the term baramin in his book Fundamental Biology (1941) and expanded on the concept in Evolution, Creation, and Science (c. 1944), in which he stated that the ability to hybridize and create viable offspring was a sufficient condition for being members of the same baramin. However, he said that it was not a necessary condition, acknowledging that observed speciation events among Drosophila fruitflies had been shown to cut off hybridization.

Marsh also originated "discontinuity systematics", the idea that there are boundaries between different animals that cannot be crossed with the consequence that there would be discontinuities in the history of life and limits to common ancestry.

== Baraminology ==
In 1990, Kurt Wise introduced baraminology as an adaptation of Marsh's and Walter ReMine's ideas that was more in keeping with young Earth creationism. Wise advocated using the Bible as a source of systematic data. Baraminology and its associated concepts have been criticized by scientists and creationists for lacking formal structure. Consequently, in 2003 Wise and other creationists proposed a refined baramin concept in the hope of developing a broader creationist model of biology. Alan Gishlick, reviewing the work of baraminologists in 2006, found it to be surprisingly rigorous and internally consistent, but concluded that the methods did not work.

Walter ReMine specified four groupings: holobaramins, monobaramins, apobaramins, and polybaramins. These are, respectively, all things of one kind; some things of the same kind; groups of kinds; and any mixed grouping of things. These groups correspond to the concepts of holophyly, monophyly, paraphyly, and polyphyly used in cladistics.

=== Methods ===
Baraminology employs many of the same methods used in evolutionary systematics, including cladistics and Analysis of Pattern (ANOPA). However, instead of identifying continuity between groups of organisms based on shared similarities, baraminology uses these methods to search for morphological and genetic gaps between groups. Baraminologists have also developed their own creationist systematics software, known as BDIST, to measure distance between groups.

=== Criticism ===
The methods of baraminology are not universally accepted among young-Earth creationists. Other creationists have criticized these methods as having the same problems as traditional cladistics, as well as for occasionally producing results that they feel contradict the Bible.

Baraminology has been heavily criticized for its lack of rigorous tests and post-study rejection of data to make it better fit the desired findings. By denying general common descent, it tends to produce inconsistent results that also conflict with evidence discovered by biology. Created kinds have been compared to other attempts at "alternate research" to produce artificial, pseudoscientific "evidence" that supports preconceived conclusions, similarly to how advocacy was done by the tobacco industry. The US National Academy of Sciences and numerous other scientific and scholarly organizations recognize creation science as pseudoscience.

Some techniques employed in Baraminology have been used to demonstrate evolution, thereby calling baraminological conclusions into question.

== See also ==
- Antediluvian
- Creatio ex nihilo
- Flood geology
- Garden of Eden
- Pre-Adamites
