= Finis Jennings Dake =

American Pentecostal minister and evangelist

Personal details
- Born: October 18, 1902 Iberia, Miller County, Missouri, U.S.
- Died: July 7, 1987 (aged 84) Lawrenceville, Georgia, U.S.
- Denomination: Pentecostal (independent)
- Occupation: Minister, evangelist, author

Finis Jennings Dake (October 18, 1902 – July 7, 1987) was an American Pentecostal minister and evangelist born in Iberia, Miller County, Missouri. He is known primarily for his writings on Pentecostal and Charismatic evangelical Christian spirituality and dispensationalism. His most well-known work was the Dake Annotated Reference Bible (1963), which Charisma magazine called "the Pentecostal Study Bible." The Dictionary of Pentecostal and Charismatic Movements states that Dake's "impact on conservative Pentecostalism cannot be overstated."

== Early life and conversion ==
Dake was born in Iberia, Missouri, to James Henry and Mary Ellen Dake, one of eleven children. He later wrote that he "rejected Christianity in my youth, until I found some believers who lived the life they professed." After weeks of deliberation, he experienced a born-again conversion and received what he described as "a great anointing of the Spirit" in May 1920, at age 17. Dake claimed that upon this experience he was immediately able to quote hundreds of Scripture verses without having previously memorized them, earning him the nickname "the Walking Bible." He studied the Bible diligently and claimed to have spent nearly 100,000 hours over the course of his ministry studying its teachings.

== Ministry career ==
Dake preached his first sermon in 1925 and was ordained by the Assemblies of God denomination two years later at the age of 24. Starting in 1927, he served for two years as principal of Texico Bible School in Dallas, Texas, followed by three years as Dean of Men and teacher at Southwestern Bible School in Enid, Oklahoma.

After working as a pastor and evangelist in Texas and Oklahoma, he moved to Zion, Illinois, in 1932 to become the pastor of the Christian Assembly Church. In Zion, he also founded Shiloh Bible Institute, which ultimately merged with Central Bible Institute. The institute was located in the home formerly owned by controversial faith healer John Alexander Dowie.

=== Mann Act conviction ===
In 1937, during Dake's ministry in Zion, he was convicted of violating the Mann Act by willfully transporting 16-year-old Emma Barelli across the Wisconsin state line "for the purpose of debauchery and other immoral practices." The May 27, 1936, issue of the Chicago Daily Tribune reported that Dake registered at hotels in Waukegan, Bloomington, and East St. Louis with the girl under the name "Christian Anderson and wife". With the possibility of a jury trial and subject to penalties of up to ten years' imprisonment and a fine of $10,000, Dake pleaded guilty, and served six months in the House of Corrections in Milwaukee, Wisconsin. During his incarceration, he reportedly continued work on annotating the Bible, a project that later formed the basis of his reference edition.

Though he maintained his innocence of intent, his ordination with the Assemblies of God was revoked. Dake returned to his family and the Christian Assembly Church, who stood by him during the ordeal. He subsequently relocated to Cleveland, Tennessee, where he joined the Church of God denomination, receiving formal ordination from them in 1948. He also launched a radio ministry that year. Dake eventually retired as an attendee of a Church of God congregation.

== Writings ==
The Dake Annotated Reference Bible (1963) was the first widely published study Bible produced by someone from within Pentecostalism. His annotated Authorized King James Version of the Bible took seven years to complete and contains more than 35,000 commentary notes, 500,000 cross-references, and approximately 9,000 outline headings. The Dictionary of Pentecostal and Charismatic Movements states that the Dake Bible "became the 'bread and butter' of many prominent preachers and the 'staple' of Pentecostal congregations." The 35,000 notes in the Dake Bible have been criticized by mainline Christian theologians as reflecting personal, rather than Biblically based, commentary, and his hyperliteral approach to interpretation has drawn scrutiny from evangelical scholars.

Along with his annotated Bible, Dake's other works include God's Plan for Man (1949), Revelation Expounded, and Bible Truths Unmasked. In 1961, Dake established his own publishing company, Dake Bible Sales.

=== Influence ===
Dake's notes influenced numerous Charismatic and Word of Faith leaders such as Kenneth Copeland, Kenneth Hagin, and Benny Hinn. Jimmy Swaggart wrote of Dake: "Finis Dake was a scholar unparalleled. I owe my Bible education to this man." Other ministers influenced by his writings include Joyce Meyer, Marilyn Hickey, and Rod Parsley.

=== Controversial doctrines ===
Dake's theological positions have generated significant controversy. His writings advocate a pre-Adamite world theory, assert that God possesses a physical "spirit body" with bodily parts, and promote a dispensationalist framework. He also authored a pamphlet titled "30 Reasons for Segregation of Races," which used biblical arguments to support racial segregation. The Christian Research Institute has characterized some of Dake's doctrines as having "as much in common with the cults as with historic Christian theology."

== Death ==
Dake died of complications from Parkinson's disease on July 7, 1987, at his home in Lawrenceville, Georgia.
