= Gap creationism =

Type of creationism

Gap creationism (also known as ruin-restoration creationism, restoration creationism, or "the Gap Theory") is a form of creationism that posits that the six-yom creation period, as described in the Book of Genesis, involved six literal 24-hour days (light being "day" and dark "night" as God specified), but that there was a gap of time between two distinct creations in the first and the second chapters of Genesis, which the theory states explains many scientific observations, including the age of the Earth. It differs from day-age creationism, which posits that the 'days' of creation were much longer periods (of thousands or millions of years), and from young Earth creationism, which although it agrees concerning the six literal 24-hour days of creation, does not posit any gap of time.

== History ==
From 1814, Thomas Chalmers popularized gap creationism; he attributed the concept to the 17th-century Dutch Arminian theologian Simon Episcopius. Chalmers wrote:

"My own opinion, as published in 1814, is that it [Genesis 1:1] forms no part of the first day, but refers to a period of indefinite antiquity when God created the worlds out of nothing. The commencement of the first day's work I hold to be the moving of God's Spirit upon the face of the waters. We can allow geology the amplest time...without infringing even on the literalities of the Mosaic record."

Chalmers became a divinity professor at the University of Edinburgh, founder of the Free Church of Scotland, and author of one of the Bridgewater Treatises. Other early proponents of gap creationism included Oxford University geology professor and fellow Bridgewater author William Buckland, Sharon Turner and Edward Hitchcock. The idea gained widespread attention when a "second creative act" was discussed prominently in the reference notes for Genesis in the influential 1917 Scofield Reference Bible.

In 1954, a few years before the re-emergence of young-Earth flood geology eclipsed gap creationism, influential evangelical theologian Bernard Ramm wrote in The Christian View of Science and Scripture:

"The gap theory has become the standard interpretation throughout hyper-orthodoxy, appearing in an endless stream of books, booklets, Bible studies, and periodical articles. In fact, it has become so sacrosanct with some that to question it is equivalent to tampering with Sacred Scripture or to manifest modernistic leanings".

Ramm's book became influential in the formation of another alternative to gap creationism, that of progressive creationism, which found favour with more conservative members of the American Scientific Affiliation (a fellowship of scientists who are Christians), with the more modernist wing of that fellowship favouring theistic evolution.

Religious proponents of this form of creationism have included Cyrus I. Scofield, Harry Rimmer, G. H. Pember, Lewis Sperry Chafer, Oral Roberts, Jimmy Swaggart, Perry Stone, L. Allen Higley, Arthur Pink, Peter Ruckman, Finis Jennings Dake, Chuck Missler, Robert Thieme, R. A. Torrey, E. W. Bullinger, Charles Welch, Victor Paul Wierwille, Donald Grey Barnhouse, Herbert W. Armstrong, Garner Ted Armstrong, Michael Pearl and Clarence Larkin.

== Interpretation of Genesis ==
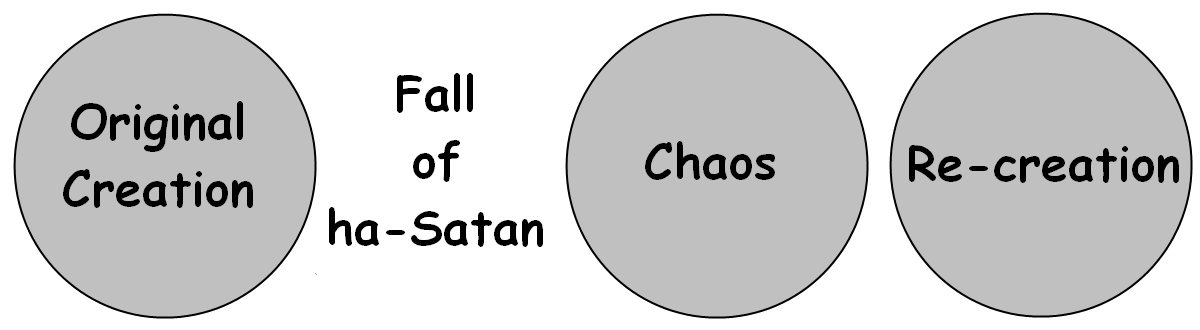
Gap creationism

Some gap creationists may believe that science has proven beyond reasonable doubt that the Earth is far older than can be accounted for by, for instance, adding up the ages of Biblical patriarchs as James Ussher famously attempted in the 17th century when he developed the Ussher chronology.

Gap creationists who hold to a young-earth position stress that it is more accurate to posit Genesis 1:2 as destruction rather than a preparatory state for God's creation of Earth. They also hold that Noah's flood was a global flood and reject the idea that humans existed before Adam.

For some, the gap theory allows both the Genesis creation account and geological science to be inerrant in matters of scientific fact. Gap creationists believe that certain facts about the past and the age of the Earth have been omitted from the Genesis account; they hold that there was a gap of time in the biblical account that lasted an unknown number of years between a first creation in Genesis 1:1 and a second creation (or restoration) in Genesis 1:2–31. By positing such an event, various observations in a wide range of fields, including the age of the Earth, the age of the universe, dinosaurs, fossils, ice cores, ice ages, water on other planets, and geological formations are allowed by adherents to have occurred as outlined by science without contradicting their literal belief in Genesis.

== Biblical support ==
Because there is no specific information given in Genesis concerning the proposed gap of time, other scriptures are used to support and explain what may have occurred during this period and to explain the specific linguistic reasoning behind this interpretation of the Hebrew text. A short list of examples is given below:

- The Masoretic Text contains a small mark at the end of Genesis 1:1, referred to as a rebhia, which acts as a "disjunctive accent", indicating that the reader is to pause before proceeding to the next verse. It is one indication, among others, that the waw which introduces verse 2 should be translated "but" rather than "and".
- The word "was" in Genesis 1:2 for some adherents is more accurately translated "became". Such a word choice makes the gap interpretation easier to see in modern English.
- God is perfect and everything He does is perfect, so a newly created Earth from the hand of God should not have been without form and void and shrouded in darkness. Deuteronomy 32:4, Isaiah 45:18 1 John 1:5
- The Holy Spirit was "renewing" the face of the Earth as he hovered over the face of the waters, noting that the water-covered planet already existed. Psalms 104:30
- Angels already existed in a state of grace when God "laid the foundations of the Earth", so there had been at least one creative act of God before the six days of Genesis. Job 38:4–7
- Satan and his angels caused the war in Heaven (Revelation 12:7–9) and had fallen from grace (Isaiah 14:12) (Luke 10:18) "in the beginning" which, since the serpent tempted Adam and Eve, had to have occurred before the Fall of man. Isaiah 14:12–15, Ezekiel 28:11–19, John 8:44

== See also ==
- Answers in Genesis
- Dating creation
- Silurian hypothesis
