= Allegorical interpretations of Genesis =

Readings of the biblical book

Allegorical interpretations of Genesis are readings of the biblical Book of Genesis that treat elements of the narrative as symbols or types, rather than viewing them literally as recording historical events. Either way, Judaism and Christianity treat Genesis as canonical scripture, and believers generally regard it as having spiritual significance.

The opening chapter of Genesis tells a story of God's creation of the universe and of humankind as taking place over the course of six successive stages or phases (six "yom" in the original Hebrew texts, translated as "days" (Note: A day is the period of time it takes for the Earth to complete one revolution on its access (approximately 24 hours). However, in the first creation story the Earth is not created until the third stage of the process. The Earth therefore did not exist for the first two stages, so the concept of a day remains fuzzy for the first two stages.) in English). Some Christian and Jewish schools of thought (such as Christian fundamentalism) read these biblical passages literally, assuming each "day" of creation as 24 hours in duration. Others (Eastern Orthodox, and mainline Protestant denominations) read the story allegorically, and hold that the biblical account aims to describe humankind's relationship to creation and the creator, that Genesis 1 does not describe actual historical events, and that the six "days" of creation simply represent a long period of time. The Catholic Church allows for a variety of interpretations, but insists on the doctrines of creation ex nihilo, human monogenism, original sin, and the Imago Dei.

Genesis 2 records a second account of creation. Chapter 3 introduces a talking serpent, which many Christians identify as Satan in disguise. Many Christians in ancient times regarded the early chapters of Genesis as true both as history and as allegory.

Other Jews and Christians have long regarded the creation account of Genesis as an allegory – even prior to the development of modern science and the scientific accounts (based on the scientific method) of cosmological, biological and human origins. Notable proponents of allegorical interpretation include:

- the Christian theologian Origen, who wrote in the 2nd century that it was inconceivable to consider Genesis as literal history
- Augustine of Hippo, who in the 4th century, on theological grounds, argued that God created everything in the universe in the same instant, and not in six "days" as a plain reading of Genesis would require
- the even earlier 1st-century Jewish scholar Philo of Alexandria, who wrote that it would be a mistake to think that creation happened in six days or in any determinate amount of time.

== Interpretation ==
=== Church historians on allegorical interpretation of Genesis ===
The literalist reading of some contemporary Christians and New Atheists maligns the allegorical or mythical interpretation of Genesis as a belated attempt to reconcile science with the biblical account. They maintain that the story of origins had always been interpreted literally until modern science (and, specifically, biological evolution) arose and challenged it. This view is not the consensus view, however, as demonstrated below:

According to Rowan Williams: "[For] most of the history of Christianity there's been an awareness that a belief that everything depends on the creative act of God, is quite compatible with a degree of uncertainty or latitude about how precisely that unfolds in creative time."

Some religious historians consider that biblical literalism came about with the rise of Protestantism; before the Reformation, the Bible was not usually interpreted in a completely literal way. Stanley Jaki, a Benedictine priest and theologian who is also a distinguished physicist, states in his Bible and Science:

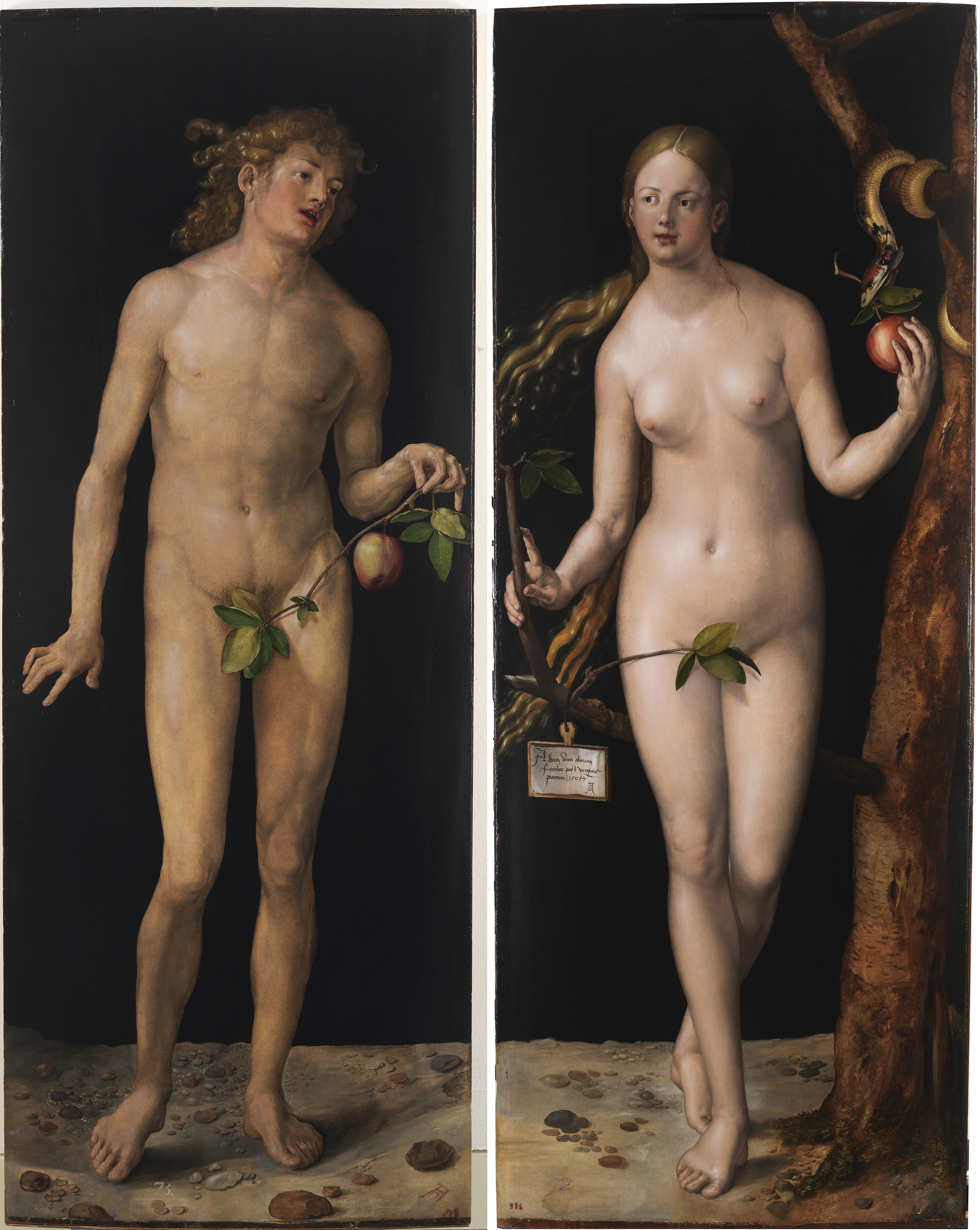
Adam and Eve, by Albrecht Dürer (1507).

Insofar as the study of the original languages of the Bible was severed from authoritative ecclesiastical preaching as its matrix, it fueled literalism... Biblical literalism taken for a source of scientific information is making the rounds even nowadays among creationists who would merit Julian Huxley's description of 'bibliolaters.' They merely bring discredit to the Bible as they pile grist upon grist on the mills of latter-day Huxleys, such as Hoyle, Sagan, Gould, and others. The fallacies of creationism go deeper than fallacious reasonings about scientific data. Where creationism is fundamentally at fault is its resting its case on a theological faultline: the biblicism constructed by the [Protestant] Reformers.

However, the Russian Orthodox hieromonk Seraphim Rose has argued that leading Orthodox saints such as Basil the Great, Gregory the Theologian, John Chrysostom and Ephraim the Syrian believed that Genesis should be treated as a historical account.

== Ancient Christian interpretations ==
=== Finding allegory in history ===
Maxine Clarke Beach comments Paul's assertion in Galatians 4:21–31 that the Genesis story of Abraham's sons is an allegory, writing that "This allegorical interpretation has been one of the biblical texts used in the long history of Christian anti-Semitism, which its author could not have imagined or intended".

Other New Testament writers took a similar approach to the Jewish Bible. The Gospel of Matthew reinterprets a number of passages. Where the prophet Hosea has God say of Israel, "Out of Egypt I called my son," (Hosea 11:1), Matthew interprets the phrase as a reference to Jesus. Likewise, Isaiah's promise of a child as a sign to King Ahaz (Isaiah 7:14) is understood by Matthew to refer to Jesus.

Later Christians followed their example. Irenaeus of Lyons, in his work Against Heresies from the middle of the 2nd century, saw the story of Adam, Eve and the serpent pointing to the death of Jesus:

Now in this same day that they did eat, in that also did they die. But according to the cycle and progress of the days, after which one is termed first, another second, and another third, if anybody seeks diligently to learn upon what day out of the seven it was that Adam died, he will find it by examining the dispensation of the Lord. For by summing up in Himself the whole human race from the beginning to the end, He has also summed up its death. From this it is clear that the Lord suffered death, in obedience to His Father, upon that day on which Adam died while he disobeyed God. Now he died on the same day in which he did eat. For God said, 'In that day on which ye shall eat of it, ye shall die by death.' The Lord, therefore, recapitulating in Himself this day, underwent His sufferings upon the day preceding the Sabbath, that is, the sixth day of the creation, on which day man was created; thus granting him a second creation by means of His passion, which is that [creation] out of death.

In the 3rd century, Origen and others of the Alexandrian school claimed that the Bible's true meaning could be found only by reading it allegorically. Origen explained in De Principiis that sometimes spiritual teachings could be gleaned from historical events, and sometimes the lessons could only be taught through stories that, taken literally, would "seem incapable of containing truth."

=== "Days" of creation ===
Early Christians seem to have been divided over whether to interpret the "days" of creation in Genesis 1 as literal days, or to understand them allegorically. The term used in the Hebrew texts is "yom", which means "a period of time" and is usually translated into English as "day".

For example, Basil the Great rejected an allegorical interpretation in his Hexaëmeron, without commenting on the literalism of the days:

I know the laws of allegory, though less by myself than from the works of others. There are those truly, who do not admit the common sense of the Scriptures, for whom water is not water, but some other nature, who see in a plant, in a fish, what their fancy wishes, who change the nature of reptiles and of wild beasts to suit their allegories, like the interpreters of dreams who explain visions in sleep to make them serve their own ends. For me grass is grass; plant, fish, wild beast, domestic animal, I take all in the literal sense. 'For I am not ashamed of the Gospel' [Romans 1:16].

'And there was evening and there was morning: one day.' And the evening and the morning were one day. Why does Scripture say 'one day the first day'? Before speaking to us of the second, the third, and the fourth days, would it not have been more natural to call that one the first which began the series? If it therefore says 'one day,' it is from a wish to determine the measure of day and night, and to combine the time that they contain. Now twenty-four hours fill up the space of one day -- we mean of a day and of a night; and if, at the time of the solstices, they have not both an equal length, the time marked by Scripture does not the less circumscribe their duration. It is as though it said: twenty-four hours measure the space of a day, or that, in reality a day is the time that the heavens starting from one point take to return there. Thus, every time that, in the revolution of the sun, evening and morning occupy the world, their periodical succession never exceeds the space of one day.

Origen of Alexandria, in a passage that was later chosen by Gregory of Nazianzus for inclusion in the Philocalia, an anthology of some of his most important texts, made the following remarks:

For who that has understanding will suppose that the first, and second, and third day, and the evening and the morning, existed without a sun, and moon, and stars? And that the first day was, as it were, also without a sky? And who is so foolish as to suppose that God, after the manner of a husbandman, planted a paradise in Eden, towards the east, and placed in it a tree of life, visible and palpable, so that one tasting of the fruit by the bodily teeth obtained life? And again, that one was a partaker of good and evil by masticating what was taken from the tree? And if God is said to walk in the paradise in the evening, and Adam to hide himself under a tree, I do not suppose that anyone doubts that these things figuratively indicate certain mysteries, the history having taken place in appearance, and not literally.

In Contra Celsum, an apologetic work written in response to the pagan intellectual Celsus, Origen also said:

And with regard to the creation of the light upon the first day, and of the firmament upon the second, and of the gathering together of the waters that are under the heaven into their several reservoirs on the third (the earth thus causing to sprout forth those (fruits) which are under the control of nature alone), and of the (great) lights and stars upon the fourth, and of aquatic animals upon the fifth, and of land animals and man upon the sixth, we have treated to the best of our ability in our notes upon Genesis, as well as in the foregoing pages, when we found fault with those who, taking the words in their apparent signification, said that the time of six days was occupied in the creation of the world.

Augustine of Hippo, one of the most influential theologians of Western Christianity, especially Catholicism, suggested that the Biblical text should not be interpreted literally if it contradicts what we know from science and our God-given reason. From an important passage on his The Literal Interpretation of Genesis (early fifth century, AD), Augustine wrote:

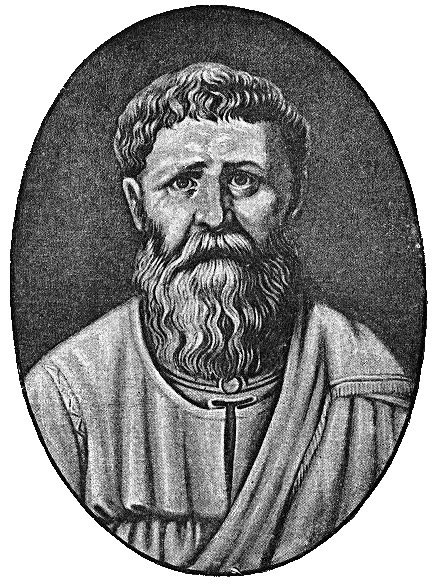
Augustine of Hippo

It not infrequently happens that something about the earth, about the sky, about other elements of this world, about the motion and rotation or even the magnitude and distances of the stars, about definite eclipses of the sun and moon, about the passage of years and seasons, about the nature of animals, of fruits, of stones, and of other such things, may be known with the greatest certainty by reasoning or by experience, even by one who is not a Christian. It is too disgraceful and ruinous, though, and greatly to be avoided, that he [the non-Christian] should hear a Christian speaking so idiotically on these matters, and as if in accord with Christian writings, that he might say that he could scarcely keep from laughing when he saw how totally in error they are. In view of this and in keeping it in mind constantly while dealing with the book of Genesis, I have, insofar as I was able, explained in detail and set forth for consideration the meanings of obscure passages, taking care not to affirm rashly some one meaning to the prejudice of another and perhaps better explanation.

With the scriptures it is a matter of treating about the faith. For that reason, as I have noted repeatedly, if anyone, not understanding the mode of divine eloquence, should find something about these matters [about the physical universe] in our books, or hear of the same from those books, of such a kind that it seems to be at variance with the perceptions of his own rational faculties, let him believe that these other things are in no way necessary to the admonitions or accounts or predictions of the scriptures. In short, it must be said that our authors knew the truth about the nature of the skies, but it was not the intention of the Spirit of God, who spoke through them, to teach men anything that would not be of use to them for their salvation.

In the book, Augustine took the view that everything in the universe was created simultaneously by God, and not in seven days like a plain account of Genesis would require. He argues that the six-day structure of creation presented in the book of Genesis represents a logical framework, rather than the passage of time in a physical way. Augustine also does not envisage original sin as originating structural changes in the universe, and even suggests that the bodies of Adam and Eve were already created mortal before the Fall. Apart from his specific views, Augustine recognizes that the interpretation of the creation story is difficult, and remarks that we should be willing to change our mind about it as new information comes up.

In The City of God, Augustine rejected both the immortality of the human race proposed by pagans, and contemporary ideas of ages (such as those of certain Greeks and Egyptians) that differed from the church's sacred writings:

Let us, then, omit the conjectures of men who know not what they say, when they speak of the nature and origin of the human race. For some hold the same opinion regarding men that they hold regarding the world itself, that they have always been... They are deceived, too, by those highly mendacious documents which profess to give the history of many thousand years, though, reckoning by the sacred writings, we find that not 6000 years have yet passed.

However, Augustine is quoting here about the age of human civilization not the age of the Earth based on his use of early Christian histories. Those histories are no longer considered accurate in terms of exact years and therefore either the 6000 years is not an exact number or the years aren't actual literal years.

Augustine also comments on the word "day" in the creation week, admitting the interpretation is difficult:

But simultaneously with time the world was made, if in the world's creation change and motion were created, as seems evident from the order of the first six or seven days. For in these days the morning and evening are counted, until, on the sixth day, all things which God then made were finished, and on the seventh the rest of God was mysteriously and sublimely signalized. What kind of days these were it is extremely difficult, or perhaps impossible for us to conceive, and how much more to say!

== Contemporary Christian considerations ==
Many modern Christian theologians, Roman Catholic, Eastern Orthodox, and mainline Protestants, have rejected literalistic interpretations of Genesis in favour of allegorical or mythopoietic interpretations such as the literary framework view. Many Christian Fundamentalists have considered such rejection unmerited. Sir Robert Anderson wrote, "Christ and Criticism" in The Fundamentals, which wholly rejected a non-literal interpretation of Genesis by Jesus Christ. In modern times, Answers in Genesis has been a strong advocate of a literal interpretation of Genesis.

Catholic theologian Ludwig Ott in his authoritative Fundamentals of Catholic Dogma, under the section "The Divine Work of Creation", (pages 92–122) covers the "biblical hexahemeron" (the "six days" of creation), the creation of man, Adam/Eve, original sin, the Fall, and the statements of the early Fathers, saints, church councils, and popes relevant to the matter. Ott makes the following comments on the "science" of Genesis and the Fathers:

as the hagiographers in profane things make use of a popular, that is, a non-scientific form of exposition suitable to the mental perception of their times, a more liberal interpretation, is possible here. The Church gives no positive decisions in regard to purely scientific questions, but limits itself to rejecting errors which endanger faith. Further, in these scientific matters there is no virtue in a consensus of the Fathers since they are not here acting as witnesses of the Faith, but merely as private scientists... Since the findings of reason and the supernatural knowledge of Faith go back to the same source, namely to God, there can never be a real contradiction between the certain discoveries of the profane sciences and the Word of God properly understood.

As the Sacred Writer had not the intention of representing with scientific accuracy the intrinsic constitution of things, and the sequence of the works of creation but of communicating knowledge in a popular way suitable to the idiom and to the pre-scientific development of his time, the account is not to be regarded or measured as if it were couched in language which is strictly scientific... The Biblical account of the duration and order of Creation is merely a literary clothing of the religious truth that the whole world was called into existence by the creative word of God. The Sacred Writer utilized for this purpose the pre-scientific picture of the world existing at the time. The numeral six of the days of Creation is to be understood as an anthropomorphism. God's work of creation represented in schematic form (opus distinctionis — opus ornatus) by the picture of a human working week, the termination of the work by the picture of the Sabbath rest. The purpose of this literary device is to manifest Divine approval of the working week and the Sabbath rest.

Pope John Paul II wrote to the Pontifical Academy of Sciences on the subject of cosmology and how to interpret Genesis:

Cosmogony and cosmology have always aroused great interest among peoples and religions. The Bible itself speaks to us of the origin of the universe and its make-up, not in order to provide us with a scientific treatise, but in order to state the correct relationships of man with God and with the universe. Sacred Scripture wishes simply to declare that the world was created by God, and in order to teach this truth it expresses itself in the terms of the cosmology in use at the time of the writer. The Sacred Book likewise wishes to tell men that the world was not created as the seat of the gods, as was taught by other cosmogonies and cosmologies, but was rather created for the service of man and the glory of God. Any other teaching about the origin and make-up of the universe is alien to the intentions of the Bible, which does not wish to teach how heaven was made but how one goes to heaven.

The Clergy Letter Project, drafted in 2004, and signed by thousands of US-based Christian clergy supporting science and faith, states:

We the undersigned, Christian clergy from many different traditions, believe that the timeless truths of the Bible and the discoveries of modern science may comfortably coexist. We believe that the theory of evolution is a foundational scientific truth, one that has stood up to rigorous scrutiny and upon which much of human knowledge and achievement rests. To reject this truth or to treat it as 'one theory among others' is to deliberately embrace scientific ignorance and transmit such ignorance to our children. We believe that among God's good gifts are human minds capable of critical thought and that the failure to fully employ this gift is a rejection of the will of our Creator.

Prominent evangelical advocates of metaphorical interpretations of Genesis include Meredith G. Kline and Henri Blocher who advocate the literary framework view. In Beyond the Firmament: Understanding Science and the Theology of Creation, evangelical author Gordon J. Glover argues for an ancient near-eastern cosmology interpretation of Genesis, which he labels the theology of creation:

Christians need to understand the first chapter of Genesis for what it is: an 'accurate' rendering of the physical universe by ancient standards that God used as the vehicle to deliver timeless theological truth to His people. We shouldn't try to make Genesis into something that it's not by dragging it through 3,500 years of scientific progress. When reading Genesis, Christians today need to transport themselves back to Mt. Sinai and leave our modern minds in the 21st century. If you only remember one thing from this chapter make it this: Genesis is not giving us creation science. It is giving us something much more profound and practical than that. Genesis is giving us a Biblical Theology of Creation.

== Rabbinic teachings ==
Philo was the first commentator to use allegory in the Bible extensively in his writing.

Some medieval philosophical rationalists, such as Maimonides (Mosheh ben Maimon, the "Rambam") held that it was not required to read Genesis literally. In this view, one was obligated to understand Torah in a way that was compatible with the findings of science. Indeed, Maimonides, one of the great rabbis of the Middle Ages, wrote that if science and Torah were misaligned, it was either because science was not understood or the Torah was misinterpreted. Maimonides argued that if science proved a point, then the finding should be accepted and scripture should be interpreted accordingly. Before him Saadia Gaon set rules in the same spirit when an allegoric approach can be used, for example, if the plain sense contradicts logic. Solomon ibn Gabirol extensively used allegory in his book "Fountain of Life", cited by Abraham ibn Ezra. In 1305 Shlomo ben Aderet wrote a letter against unrestricted usage of allegory by followers of Maimonides, like Jacob Anatoli in his book "Malmad ha-Talmidim". In spite of this Gersonides copied Maimonides' explanation of the story of Adam into his commentary on Genesis, thinly veiled by extensive usage of the word "hint". The main point of Maimonides and Gersonides is that Fall of Man is not a story about one man but about human nature. Adam is the pure intellect, Eve is a body, and the Serpent is a fantasy that tries to trap intellect through the body.

Zohar states:

If a man looks upon the Torah as merely a book presenting narratives and everyday matters, alas for him! Such a Torah, one treating with everyday concerns, and indeed a more excellent one, we too, even we, could compile. More than that, in the possession of the rulers of the world there are books of even greater merit, and these we could emulate if we wished to compile some such torah. But the Torah, in all of its words, holds supernal truths and sublime secrets.

Thus the tales related in the Torah are simply her outer garments, and woe to the man who regards that outer garb as the Torah itself, for such a man will be deprived of portion in the next world. Thus David said:" Open Thou mine eyes, that I may behold wondrous things out of Thy law" (Psalms 119:18), that is to say, the things that are underneath. See now. The most visible part of a man are the clothes that he has on, and they who lack understanding, when they look at the man, are apt not to see more in him than these clothes. In reality, however, it is the body of the man that constitutes the pride of his clothes, and his soul constitutes the pride of his body.

Woe to the sinners who look upon the Torah as simply tales pertaining to things of the world, seeing thus only the outer garment. But the righteous whose gaze penetrates to the very Torah, happy are they. Just as wine must be in a jar to keep, so the Torah must also be contained in an outer garment. That garment is made up of the tales and stories; but we, we are bound to penetrate beyond.

Nahmanides, often critical of the rationalist views of Maimonides, pointed out (in his commentary to Genesis) several non-sequiturs stemming from a literal translation of the Bible's account of Creation, and stated that the account actually symbolically refers to spiritual concepts. He quoted the Mishnah in Tractate Chagigah which states that the actual meaning of the Creation account, mystical in nature, was traditionally transmitted from teachers to advanced scholars in a private setting. Many Kabbalistic sources mention Shmitot - cosmic cycles of creation, similar to the Indian concept of yugas.

== Adam and Eve in the Baháʼí Faith ==
The Baháʼí Faith adheres to an allegorical interpretation of the Adam and Eve narrative. In Some Answered Questions, 'Abdu'l-Bahá unequivocally rejects a literal reading, instead holding that the story is a symbolic one containing "divine mysteries and universal meanings"; namely, the fall of Adam symbolizes that humanity became conscious of good and evil.

== See also ==
- Biblical cosmology
- Evolution and the Catholic Church
- Genesis creation narrative
- Rejection of evolution by religious groups
- Anastasius Sinaita
- The Challenge of Creation
- Theistic evolution
