= Yom =

Biblical Hebrew word

Yom (Hebrew: יום) is a Biblical Hebrew word which occurs in the Hebrew Bible. The word is a generic term meaning "a period of time". In both Modern and Biblical Hebrew it is usually translated as a specific period of time (such as "day", "evening", "lifetime", or "year") based on context.

== Overview ==
Although yom is commonly rendered as "day" in English translations, the word is a generic term for a period of time and can be used in different ways to refer to different, context-based timespans:

- a time period of unspecified length;
- a point of time (namely a specific day);
- a half-day or whole-day time period, such as:
  - daytime (that is, the enlightened period, as contrasted with nighttime, the darkness period),
  - sunrise to sunset, or
  - sunset to next sunset;
- a general term for time (as in "days of our lives");
- a year (in the plural use, as in "he lived many days"); or
- a finitely very long span of time.

Biblical Hebrew has a limited vocabulary, with fewer words than other languages, such as English or Spanish. (Note: Biblical Hebrew has a very small number of words, about 8,000, and around 1,700 of those words are hapax legomena in the Hebrew Bible. Modern Hebrew has about 100,000 words. For comparison modern English has over 450,000 words, and Spanish has just over 175,000 words. Standard English dictionaries typically have about 200,000 words, whereas Spanish dictionaries have about 80,000 words.) Hence words often have multiple meanings, with the exact meaning determined by context. In Strong's Lexicon, yom is Hebrew #3117 יוֹם, from an unused root that means "to be hot, as the warm hours of the day".

Yom relates to the concept of time, and is used not just for "day" or "days", but for time in general. How yom is translated depends on context, using hermeneutics. The word day is used somewhat the same way in the English language, as in "back in my grandfather's day, cars did not go very fast" or "in the day of the dinosaurs there were not many mammals".

== Bible ==
In English translations of the Holy Bible, yom is variously translated as "time" (Gen. 4:3, Is. 30:8), "year" (1 Kings 1:1, 2 Chronicles 21:19, Amos 4:4), "age" (Genesis 18:11, 24:1, 47:28; Joshua 23:1,2), "always" (Deuteronomy 5:29, 6:24, 14:23, and 2 Chronicles 18:7), "season" (Genesis 40:4, Joshua 24:7, 2 Chronicles 15:3), and as either "epoch" or "24-hour day" depending on interpretation (see Genesis 1:5,8,13,19,23,31 and 2:3; see also § Creationism below).

In the first Genesis creation narrative (Genesis 1:1–2:3), "yom" has been translated into English as "day". Whether this refers to literal, 24-hour days or a figurative length of time is debatable, and plays a key role in young- and old-Earth Creationism theories; see also § Creationism below.

== Creationism ==
In both young- and old-Earth creationisms, the yom word can have several meanings, which depend on the context in which the word is used.

In gap creationism, yom is 24 hours, but there is a gap of time between Genesis 1:1 and 1:2, before the six consecutive days of creation. In day-age creationism, yom is timespan. For the progressives, it is also a generic time-span, but with time gaps. In evolutionary creationism, also known as theistic evolution (which seeks to harmonize the Bible and the theory of evolution), the literal interpretation of yom is either not crucial or (at times) metaphorical.

== Judaism ==
Hebrew scholars reject the rule that yôm with a number or an "evening and morning" construct can only refer to 24-hour days. Hugh Ross pointed out that the earliest reference to this rule dates back to 1970s young Earth creationist literature and that no reference to it exists independent of the young Earth movement.

The word Yom is used in the names of various Jewish feast days; as, Yom Kippur, the Day of Atonement; and Yom Teruah (lit., day of shouting), the biblical name for Rosh Hashannah, the Feast of Trumpets.

Yom is also used in the name of each of the days of the week in the Hebrew calendar.

== See also ==
- Yom Tov, plural Yamim Tovim, literally the Good Day(s), the Jewish holidays
- Yom tov sheni shel galuyot, the second festival day in the Diaspora
- Yom Kippur, Day of Atonement
- Yom Kippur Katan, Minor Day of Atonement
- Yom Ha'atzmaut, Israeli Independence Day
- Yom HaShoah, full name Yom HaZikaron laShoah ve-laG'vurah, Holocaust and Heroism Remembrance Day
- Yom Hazikaron Day of Remembrance for the Fallen Soldier
- Yom Yerushalayim, Jerusalem Day
- The Day of the Lord, events of the end times
- Age of the Earth, science-based information and data about the planet's age and its methods of estimation
