= Outline of the creation–evolution controversy =

Overview of and topical guide to the creation–evolution controversy

The following outline is provided as an overview of and topical guide to the creation–evolution controversy.

== Essence ==
- Creationism, and more specifically:

- Creation science, Intelligent design, Neo-Creationism, Old Earth and Young Earth creationism

- Evolution, and more specifically:

- Natural selection, Common descent, Origins of life, Age of the Earth/Universe

- Intelligent design
- Objections to evolution

== History ==
- History of creationism
- History of evolutionary thought
- Reaction to Darwin's theory

== Arguments ==
- Entropy and life
- Evidence of common descent
- Evolutionary argument against naturalism
- Fine-tuned universe
- Irreducible complexity
- Specified complexity
- Transitional fossil (commonly known as a missing link)

== Acceptance ==
- Evolution as theory and fact
- Level of support for evolution
- Teach the Controversy
- Wedge strategy

Supporters of evolution:

- A Scientific Support for Darwinism
- List of scientific societies rejecting intelligent design
- Project Steve
- Clergy Letter Project

Supporters of creation or intelligent design

- A Scientific Dissent From Darwinism
- Answers in Genesis
- Discovery Institute
- Physicians and Surgeons who Dissent from Darwinism

== Politics ==
- Intelligent design in politics
- Politics of creationism

== Specific religious views ==
- Ahmadiyya views on evolution
- Evolution and the Roman Catholic Church
- Hindu views on evolution
- Jainism and non-creationism
- Jewish views on evolution
- Mormon views on evolution

== Public education ==
Creation and evolution in public education

- Creation and evolution in public education in the United States
- Butler Act
- Scopes trial, 1925
- Epperson v. Arkansas, 1968
- Daniel v. Waters, 1975
- Segraves v. State of California, 1981
- McLean v. Arkansas, 1982
- Edwards v. Aguillard, 1987
- Webster v. New Lenox School District, 1990
- Freiler v. Tangipahoa Parish Board of Education, 1994
- Kansas evolution hearings, 2005
- Kitzmiller v. Dover Area School District, 2005
- Selman v. Cobb County School District, 2005
