= Level of support for evolution =

Variation in support for the theory of evolution

The level of support for evolution among scientists, the public, and other groups is a topic that frequently arises in the creation–evolution controversy, and touches on educational, religious, philosophical, scientific, and political issues. The subject is especially contentious in countries where significant levels of non-acceptance of evolution by the general population exists, but evolution is taught at public schools and universities.

As of 2014, nearly all (around 98%) of the scientific community accepts evolution as the dominant scientific theory of biological diversity with, as of 2009, some 87% accepting that evolution occurs due to natural processes, such as natural selection. Scientific associations have strongly rebutted and refuted the challenges to evolution proposed by intelligent design proponents.

There are many religious groups and denominations spread across several countries who reject the theory of evolution because it is in conflict with their central belief of creationism. For example, countries having such groups include the United States, South Africa, the Muslim world, South Korea, Singapore, the Philippines, and Brazil, with smaller followings in the United Kingdom, Ireland, Japan, Italy, Germany, Israel, Australia, New Zealand, and Canada.

Several publications discuss the subject of acceptance, including a document produced by the United States National Academy of Sciences.

== Scientific ==
The vast majority of the scientific community and academia supports evolutionary theory as the only explanation that can fully account for observations in the fields of biology, paleontology, molecular biology, genetics, anthropology, and others. A 1991 Gallup poll found that about 5% of American scientists (including those with training outside biology) identified themselves as creationists.

Additionally, the scientific community considers intelligent design, a neo-creationist offshoot, to be unscientific, pseudoscience, or junk science. The U.S. National Academy of Sciences has stated that intelligent design "and other claims of supernatural intervention in the origin of life" are not science because they cannot be tested by experiment, do not generate any predictions, and propose no new hypotheses of their own. In September 2005, 38 Nobel laureates issued a statement saying "Intelligent design is fundamentally unscientific; it cannot be tested as scientific theory because its central conclusion is based on belief in the intervention of a supernatural agent." In October 2005, a coalition representing more than 70,000 Australian scientists and science teachers issued a statement saying "intelligent design is not science" and calling on "all schools not to teach Intelligent Design (ID) as science, because it fails to qualify on every count as a scientific theory".

In 1986, an amicus curiae brief, signed by 72 US Nobel Prize winners, 17 state academies of science and 7 other scientific societies, asked the US Supreme Court in Edwards v. Aguillard, to reject a Louisiana state law requiring that where evolutionary science was taught in public schools, creation science must also be taught. The brief also stated that the term "creation science" as used by the law embodied religious dogma, and that "teaching religious ideas mislabeled as science is detrimental to scientific education". This was the largest collection of Nobel Prize winners to sign a petition up to that point. According to anthropologists Almquist and Cronin, the brief is the "clearest statement by scientists in support of evolution yet produced."

There are many scientific and scholarly organizations from around the world that have issued statements in support of the theory of evolution. The American Association for the Advancement of Science, the world's largest general scientific society with more than 130,000 members and over 262 affiliated societies and academies of science including over 10 million individuals, has made several statements and issued several press releases in support of evolution. The prestigious United States National Academy of Sciences, which provides science advice to the nation, has published several books supporting evolution and criticising creationism and intelligent design.

There is a notable difference between the opinion of scientists and that of the general public in the United States. A 2009 poll by the Pew Research Center found that "Nearly all scientists (97%) say humans and other living things have evolved over time – 87% say evolution is due to natural processes, such as natural selection. The dominant position among scientists – that living things have evolved due to natural processes – is shared by only about a third (32%) of the public." A 2014 poll, also by the Pew Research Center, poll found that "65% of [U.S.] adults say that humans and other living things have evolved".

=== Votes, resolutions, and statements of scientists before 1985 ===
One of the earliest resolutions in support of evolution was issued by the American Association for the Advancement of Science in 1922, and readopted in 1929.

Another early effort to express support for evolution by scientists was organized by Nobel Prize–winning American biologist Hermann J. Muller in 1966. Muller circulated a petition entitled "Is Biological Evolution a Principle of Nature that has been well established by Science?" in May 1966:

There are no hypotheses, alternative to the principle of evolution with its "tree of life," that any competent biologist of today takes seriously. Moreover, the principle is so important for an understanding of the world we live in and of ourselves that the public in general, including students taking biology in high school, should be made aware of it, and of the fact that it is firmly established, even as the rotundity of the earth is firmly established.

This manifesto was signed by 177 of the leading American biologists, including George G. Simpson of Harvard University, Nobel Prize Winner Peter Agre of Duke University, Carl Sagan of Cornell, John Tyler Bonner of Princeton, Nobel Prize Winner George Beadle, President of the University of Chicago, and Donald F. Kennedy of Stanford University, formerly head of the United States Food and Drug Administration.

This was followed by the passing of a resolution by the American Association for the Advancement of Science (AAAS) in the fall of 1972 that stated, in part, "the theory of creation ... is neither scientifically grounded nor capable of performing the rules required of science theories". The United States National Academy of Sciences also passed a similar resolution in the fall of 1972. A statement on evolution called "A Statement Affirming Evolution as a Principle of Science." was signed by Nobel Prize Winner Linus Pauling, Isaac Asimov, George G. Simpson, Caltech Biology Professor Norman H. Horowitz, Ernst Mayr, and others, and published in 1977. The governing board of the American Geological Institute issued a statement supporting resolution in November 1981. Shortly thereafter, the AAAS passed another resolution supporting evolution and disparaging efforts to teach creationism in science classes.

To date, there are no scientifically peer-reviewed research articles that disclaim evolution listed in the scientific and medical journal search engine PubMed.

=== Project Steve ===
The Discovery Institute announced that over 700 scientists had expressed support for intelligent design as of February 8, 2007. This prompted the National Center for Science Education to produce a "light-hearted" petition called "Project Steve" in support of evolution. Only scientists named "Steve" or some variation (such as Stephen, Stephanie, and Stefan) are eligible to sign the petition. It is intended to be a "tongue-in-cheek parody" of the lists of alleged "scientists" supposedly supporting creationist principles that creationist organizations produce. The petition demonstrates that there are more scientists who accept evolution with a name like "Steve" alone (over 1370) than there are in total who support intelligent design. This is, again, why the percentage of scientists who support evolution has been estimated by Brian Alters to be about 99.9 percent.

== Religious ==
Religious Differences on the Question of Evolution (United States) Percentage who agree that evolution is the best explanation for the origin of human life on earth
Buddhist	81%
Hindu	80%
Jewish	77%
Unaffiliated	72%
Catholic	58%
Orthodox	54%
Mainline Protestant	51%
Muslim	45%
Hist. Black Protest.	38%
Evang. Protestant	24%
Mormon	22%
Jehovah's Witnesses	8%
Total U.S. population percentage:48% Source: Pew Forum

Creationists have claimed that they represent the interests of true Christians, and evolution is associated only with atheism.

However, not all religious organizations find support for evolution incompatible with their religious faith. For example, 12 of the plaintiffs opposing the teaching of creation science in the influential McLean v. Arkansas court case were clergy representing Methodist, Episcopal, African Methodist Episcopal, Catholic, Southern Baptist, Reform Jewish, and Presbyterian groups. There are several religious organizations that have issued statements advocating the teaching of evolution in public schools. In addition, the Archbishop of Canterbury, Dr. Rowan Williams, issued statements in support of evolution in 2006. The Clergy Letter Project is a signed statement by 12,808 (as of 28 May 2012) American Christian clergy of different denominations rejecting creationism organized in 2004. Molleen Matsumura of the National Center for Science Education found, of Americans in the twelve largest Christian denominations, at least 77% belong to churches that support evolution education (and that at one point, this figure was as high as 89.6%). These religious groups include the Catholic Church, as well as various denominations of Protestantism, including the United Methodist Church, National Baptist Convention, USA, Evangelical Lutheran Church in America, Presbyterian Church (USA), National Baptist Convention of America, African Methodist Episcopal Church, the Episcopal Church, and others. A figure closer to about 71% is presented by the analysis of Walter B. Murfin and David F. Beck.

Michael Shermer argued in Scientific American in October 2006 that evolution supports concepts like family values, avoiding lies, fidelity, moral codes and the rule of law. Shermer also suggests that evolution gives more support to the notion of an omnipotent creator, rather than a tinkerer with limitations based on a human model.

=== Ahmadiyya ===
The Ahmadiyya Movement universally accepts evolution and actively promotes it. Mirza Tahir Ahmad, Fourth Caliph of the Ahmadiyya Muslim Community has stated in his magnum opus Revelation, Rationality, Knowledge & Truth that evolution did occur but only through God being the One who brings it about. It does not occur itself, according to the Ahmadiyya Muslim Community. The Ahmadis do not believe Adam was the first human on Earth, but merely the first prophet to receive a revelation of God.

=== Baha'i Faith ===
A fundamental part of `Abdul-Bahá's teachings on evolution is the belief that all life came from the same origin: "the origin of all material life is one..." He states that from this sole origin, the complete diversity of life was generated: "Consider the world of created beings, how varied and diverse they are in species, yet with one sole origin" He explains that a slow, gradual process led to the development of complex entities:

[T]he growth and development of all beings is gradual; this is the universal divine organization and the natural system. The seed does not at once become a tree; the embryo does not at once become a man; the mineral does not suddenly become a stone. No, they grow and develop gradually and attain the limit of perfection

=== Catholic Church ===
The 1950 encyclical Humani generis advocated scepticism towards evolution without explicitly rejecting it; this was substantially amended by Pope John-Paul II in 1996 in an address to the Pontifical Academy of Sciences in which he said, "Today, almost half a century after publication of the encyclical, new knowledge has led to the recognition of the theory of evolution as more than a hypothesis." Between 2000 and 2002 the International Theological Commission found that "Converging evidence from many studies in the physical and biological sciences furnishes mounting support for some theory of evolution to account for the development and diversification of life on earth, while controversy continues over the pace and mechanisms of evolution." This statement was published by the Vatican in July 2004 by the authority of Cardinal Ratzinger (who became Pope Benedict XVI) who was the president of the Commission at the time.

The Magisterium has not made an authoritative statement on intelligent design, and has permitted arguments on both sides of the issue. In 2005, Cardinal Christoph Schönborn of Vienna appeared to endorse intelligent design when he denounced philosophically materialist interpretations of evolution. In an op-ed in the New York Times he said "Evolution in the sense of common ancestry might be true, but evolution in the neo-Darwinian sense - an unguided, unplanned process of random variation and natural selection - is not."

In the January 16–17 2006 edition of the official Vatican newspaper L'Osservatore Romano, University of Bologna evolutionary biology Professor Fiorenzo Facchini wrote an article agreeing with the judge's ruling in Kitzmiller v. Dover and stating that intelligent design was unscientific. Jesuit Father George Coyne, former director of the Vatican Observatory, has also denounced intelligent design.

=== Sikhism ===
The Sikh scripture explicitly states that the Universe and its processes are created by, and subject to, the laws of Nature. Furthermore, the name that is used by Sikhs for God, Waheguru, is literally translated as "the Wonderful Teacher", implying that these laws are, in principle at least, at least partially discernible by human inquiry. One of the hymns that observant Sikhs recite daily describes the orbit of the Earth as being caused by those same laws (and not some mythological cause). Thus, the scientific world-view, which includes the Darwinian theory of evolution, is compatible with traditional Sikh belief.

=== Hinduism ===
Hindus believe in the concept of evolution of life on Earth. The concepts of Dashavatara—different incarnations of God starting from simple organisms and progressively becoming complex beings—and Day and Night of Brahma are generally cited as instances of Hindu acceptance of evolution.

=== US religious denominations ===
In the United States, many Protestant denominations promote creationism, preach against evolution, and sponsor lectures and debates on the subject. Denominations that explicitly advocate creationism instead of evolution or "Darwinism" include the Assemblies of God, the Free Methodist Church, Lutheran Church–Missouri Synod, Pentecostal Churches, Seventh-day Adventist Churches, Wisconsin Evangelical Lutheran Synod, Christian Reformed Church, Southern Baptist Convention, the Pentecostal Oneness churches, and the Evangelical Lutheran Synod. Jehovah's Witnesses produce day-age creationism literature to refute evolution but reject the "creationist" label, which they consider to apply only to Young Earth creationism.

== Medicine and industry ==
A common complaint of creationists is that evolution is of no value, has never been used for anything, and will never be of any use. According to many creationists, nothing would be lost by getting rid of evolution, and science and industry might even benefit.

In fact, evolution is being put to practical use in industry and widely used on a daily basis by researchers in medicine, biochemistry, molecular biology, and genetics to both formulate hypotheses about biological systems for the purposes of experimental design, as well as to rationalise observed data and prepare applications. As of May 2019 there are 554,965 scientific papers in PubMed that mention 'evolution'. Pharmaceutical companies utilize biological evolution in their development of new products, and also use these medicines to combat evolving bacteria and viruses.

Because of the perceived value of evolution in applications, there have been some expressions of support for evolution on the part of corporations. In Kansas, there has been some widespread concern in the corporate and academic communities that a move to weaken the teaching of evolution in schools will hurt the state's ability to recruit the best talent, particularly in the biotech industry. Paul Hanle of the Biotechnology Institute warned that the United States risks falling behind in the biotechnology race with other nations if it does not do a better job of teaching evolution.

James McCarter of Divergence Incorporated stated that the work of 2001 Nobel Prize winner Leland Hartwell relied heavily on the use of evolutionary knowledge and predictions, both of which have significant implications for the treatment of cancers. Furthermore, McCarter concluded that 47 of the last 50 Nobel Prizes in medicine or physiology depended on an understanding of evolutionary theory (according to McCarter's unspecified personal criteria).

== Public support ==
Acceptance of human evolution in various countries (2006)

There does not appear to be significant correlation between believing in evolution and understanding evolutionary science. In some countries, creationist beliefs (or a lack of support for evolutionary theory) are relatively widespread, even garnering a majority of public opinion. A study published in Science compared attitudes about evolution in the United States, 32 European countries, and Japan. The only country where acceptance of evolution was lower than in the United States was Turkey (25%). Public acceptance of evolution was most widespread (at over 80% of the population) in Iceland, Denmark and Sweden.

=== Afghanistan ===
According to the Pew Research Center, Afghanistan has the lowest acceptance of evolution in the Muslim countries. Only 26% of people in Afghanistan accept evolution. 62% deny human evolution and believe that humans have always existed in their present form.

=== Argentina ===
According to a 2014 poll produced by the Pew Research Center, 71% of people in Argentina believe "humans and other living things evolved over time" while 23% believe they have "always existed in the present form."

=== Armenia ===
According to the Pew Research Center, 56 percent of Armenians deny human evolution and claim that humans have always existed in their present and only 34 percent of Armenians accept human evolution.

=== Australia ===
A 2009 Nielsen poll showed that 23% of Australians believe "the biblical account of human origins," 42% believe in a "wholly scientific" explanation for the origins of life, while 32% believe in an evolutionary process "guided by God".

A 2013 survey conducted by Auspoll and the Australian Academy of Science found that 80% of Australians believe in evolution (70% believe it is currently occurring, 10% believe in evolution but do not think it is currently occurring), 12% were not sure and 9% stated they do not believe in evolution.

=== Belarus ===
According to the Pew Research Center, 63 percent of respondents in Belarus accept the theory of evolution while 23 percent of them deny evolution and claim that "humans have always existed in their present form."

=== Bolivia ===
According to a 2014 poll by the Pew Research Center, 44% of people in Bolivia believe "humans and other living things evolved over time" while 39% believe they have "always existed in the present form."

=== Brazil ===
In a 2010 poll, 59% of respondents said they believe in theistic evolution, or evolution guided by God. A further 8% believe in evolution without divine intervention, while 25% were creationists. Support for creationism was stronger among the poor and the least educated. According to a 2014 poll produced by the Pew Research Center, 66% of Brazilians agree that humans evolved over time and 29% think they have always existed in the present form.

=== Canada ===
In a 2019 nationwide poll, 61% of Canadians believe that humans evolved from less advanced life forms over millions of years, while 23% believe that God created human beings in their present form within the last 10,000 years.

=== Chile ===
According to a 2014 poll by the Pew Research Center, 69% of people in Chile believe "humans and other living things evolved over time" while 26% believe they have "always existed in the present form."

=== Colombia ===
According to a 2014 poll by the Pew Research Center, 59% of people in Colombia believe "humans and other living things evolved over time" while 35% believe they have "always existed in the present form."

=== Costa Rica ===
According to a 2014 poll by the Pew Research Center, 56% of people in Costa Rica believe "humans and other living things evolved over time" while 38% believe they have "always existed in the present form."

=== Czech Republic ===
According to the Pew Research Center, the Czech Republic has the highest acceptance of evolution in Eastern Europe. 83 percent people in the Czech Republic believe that humans evolved over time.

=== Dominican Republic ===
According to a 2014 poll by the Pew Research Center, 41% of people in Dominican Republic believe "humans and other living things evolved over time" while 56% believe they have "always existed in the present form."

=== Ecuador ===
According to a 2014 poll by the Pew Research Center, 50% of people in Ecuador believe "humans and other living things evolved over time" while 44% believe they have "always existed in the present form."

=== El Salvador ===
According to a 2014 poll by the Pew Research Center, 46% of people in El Salvador believe "humans and other living things evolved over time" while 45% believe they have "always existed in the present form."

=== Estonia ===
According to the Pew Research Center, 74% of Estonians accept the theory of evolution while 21% deny it and claim that "humans have always existed in their present form."

=== Georgia ===
According to the Pew Research Center, 58 percent of Georgians accept the theory of evolution while 34 percent of Georgians deny the theory of evolution.

=== Guatemala ===
According to a 2014 poll by the Pew Research Center, 55% of people in Guatemala believe "humans and other living things evolved over time" while 38% believe they have "always existed in the present form."

=== Honduras ===
According to a 2014 poll by the Pew Research Center, 49% of people in Honduras believe "humans and other living things evolved over time" while 45% believe they have "always existed in the present form."

=== Hungary ===
According to the Pew Research Center, 69 percent of Hungarians accept the theory of evolution and 21 percent of Hungarians deny human evolution.

=== Kazakhstan ===
According to the Pew Research Center, Kazakhstan has the highest acceptance of evolution in the Muslim countries. 79% of people in Kazakhstan accept the theory of evolution.

=== India ===
According to a 2009 survey conducted by the British Council, 77% of people in India agree that enough scientific evidence exists to support evolution. Also, 85% of God-believing Indians who know about evolution agree that life on earth evolved over time as a result of natural selection.

In the same 2009 survey carried among 10 major nations, the highest proportion that agreed that evolutionary theories alone should be taught in schools was in India, at 49%.

In a survey conducted across 12 states in India, public acceptance of evolution stood at 68.5%.

In 2023, NCERT, under the rationalization scheme, removed Darwin's theory of evolution from class 10th school textbooks. Only students who take opt for biology in class 11th will be taught Darwin's theory of evolution.

=== Indonesia ===
A 2009 survey conducted by the McGill researchers and their international collaborators found that 85% of Indonesian high school students agreed with the statement, "Millions of fossils show that life has existed for billions of years and changed over time."

=== Israel ===
More than half of Israeli Jews accept the human evolution while more than 40% deny human evolution & claim that humans have always existed in their present form.

=== Latvia ===
According to the Pew Research Center, 66 percent of Latvians accept the theory of evolution while 25 percent of Latvians deny evolution and claim that "humans have always existed in their present form."

=== Lithuania ===
According to the Pew Research Center 54 percent of Lithuanians accept the theory of evolution while 34 percent of them deny evolution and claim that "humans have always existed in their present form."

=== Mexico ===
According to a 2014 poll by the Pew Research Center, 64% of people in Mexico believe "humans and other living things evolved over time" while 32% believe they have "always existed in the present form."

=== Moldova ===
According to the Pew Research Center, 49 percent of Moldovans accept the theory of evolution while 42 percent of Moldovan deny the theory of evolution and claim that "humans have always existed in the present form."

=== Nicaragua ===
According to a 2014 poll by the Pew Research Center, 47% of people in Nicaragua believe "humans and other living things evolved over time" while 48% believe they have "always existed in the present form."

=== Norway ===
According to a 2008 Norstat poll for NRK, 59% of the Norwegian population fully accept evolution, 24% somewhat agree with the theory, 4% somewhat disagree with the theory while 8% do not accept evolution. 4% did not know.

=== Pakistan ===
A 2009 survey conducted by the McGill researchers and their international collaborators found that 86% of Pakistani high school students agreed with the statement, "Millions of fossils show that life has existed for billions of years and changed over time."

=== Panama ===
According to a 2014 poll by the Pew Research Center, 61% of people in Panama believe "humans and other living things evolved over time" while 34% believe they have "always existed in the present form."

=== Paraguay ===
According to a 2014 poll by the Pew Research Center, 59% of people in Paraguay believe "humans and other living things evolved over time" while 30% believe they have "always existed in the present form."

=== Peru ===
According to a 2014 poll by the Pew Research Center, 51% of people in Peru believe "humans and other living things evolved over time" while 39% believe they have "always existed in the present form."

=== Poland ===
According to the Pew Research Center, 61 percent of Poles accept the theory of evolution while 23 percent of Poles deny the theory of evolution and claim that "humans have always existed in their present form."

=== Russia ===
According to the Pew Research Center, 65 percent of Russians accept the theory of evolution while 26 percent of Russians deny the theory of evolution and claim that "humans have always existed in their present form."

=== Serbia ===
According to the Pew Research Center, 61 percent of Serbians accept the theory of evolution while 29 percent of respondents in Serbia deny the theory of evolution while and claim that "humans have always existed in their present form."

=== Turkey ===
In 2009, Ömer Ziya Cebeci, then vice president of the Turkish government agency Scientific and Technological Research Council of Turkey (TÜBİTAK), publisher of the popular Turkish science magazine Bilim ve Teknik (Science and Technology), ordered the removal of a cover story about the life and work of Charles Darwin from the March 2009 issue of the magazine just before it went to press. The event caused widespread protests across the country and calls for Cebeci to resign. Cebeci was removed from his position in 2011, and a court in 2013 ruled that Cebeci had unlawfully dismissed the editor of Bilim ve Teknik from her position.

=== United Kingdom ===
A 2006 United Kingdom poll on the "origin and development of life" asked participants to choose between three different explanations for the origin of life: 22% chose (Young Earth) creationism, 17% opted for intelligent design ("certain features of living things are best explained by the intervention of a supernatural being, e.g. God"), 48% selected evolution theory (with a divine role explicitly excluded) and the rest did not know. A 2009 poll found that only 38% of Britons believe God played no role in evolution. In a 2012 poll, 69% of Britons believe that humans evolved from less advanced life forms, while 17% believe that God created human beings in their present forms within the last 10,000 years.

=== United States ===
United States courts have ruled in favor of teaching evolution in science classrooms, and against teaching creationism, in numerous cases such as Edwards v. Aguillard, Hendren v. Campbell, McLean v. Arkansas and Kitzmiller v. Dover Area School District.

A prominent organization in the United States behind the intelligent design movement is the Discovery Institute, which, through its Center for Science and Culture, conducts a number of public relations and lobbying campaigns aimed at influencing the public and policy makers in order to advance its position in academia. The Discovery Institute claims that because there is a significant lack of public support for evolution, that public schools should, as their campaign states, "Teach the Controversy", although there is no controversy over the validity of evolution within the scientific community.

2009 Pew Research
US Group	Young-Earth Creationism	Belief in evolution guided by supreme being	Belief in evolution due to natural processes	NA
Public	31%	22%	32%	15%
Scientists	2%	8%	87%	3%

2014 Gallup poll
Religious Institution Attendance	Young-Earth Creationism	Belief in God-guided evolution	Belief in evolution without God
Attend church weekly	69%	24%	1%
Attend church nearly weekly/monthly	47%	39%	9%
Seldom/never attend church	23%	32%	34%

The US has one of the highest levels of public belief in biblical or other religious accounts of the origins of life on Earth among industrialized countries. However, according to the Pew Research Center, 62 percent of adults in the United States accept human evolution while 34 percent of adults believe that humans have always existed in their present form. The poll involved over 35,000 adults in the United States. However acceptance of evolution varies per state. For example, the State of Vermont has the highest acceptance of evolution of any other State in the United States. 79% people in Vermont accept human evolution. While Mississippi with 43% has the lowest acceptance of evolution of any US state.

According to a 2021 study, in 2019, 54% of Americans agreed with the statement: "Human beings, as we know them today, developed from earlier species of animals". A 2019 Gallup creationism survey found that 40% of adults in the United States inclined to the belief that "God created humans in their present form at one time within the last 10,000 years" when asked for their beliefs regarding the origin and development of human beings. 22% believed that "human beings have developed over millions of years from less advanced forms of life, but God had no part in this process", despite 49% of respondents indicating they believed in evolution. Belief in creationism is inversely correlated to education; only 22% of those with post-graduate degrees believe in strict creationism. The level of support for strict creationism could be even lower when poll results are adjusted after comparison with other polls with questions that more specifically account for uncertainty and ambivalence. A 2000 poll for People for the American Way found that 70% of the American public thought that evolution is compatible with a belief in God.

2007 Gallup poll
Political identification	Do not believe in evolution	Believe in evolution	NA
Republican	68%	30%	2%
Democrat	40%	57%	3%
Independent	37%	61%	2%

2005 Pew Research Center poll
Political identification	Creationist	Believe in evolution	NA
Republican	60%	11%	29%
Democrat	29%	44%	27%

According to a 2021 study, in 2019, 34% of conservative Republicans and 83% of liberal Democrats accepted evolution. A 2005 Pew Research Center poll found that 70% of evangelical Christians believed that living organisms have not changed since their creation, but only 31% of Catholics and 32% of mainline Protestants shared this opinion. A 2005 Harris Poll estimated that 63% of liberals and 37% of conservatives agreed that humans and other primates have a common ancestry.

=== Ukraine ===
According to the Pew Research Center, 54 percent of respondents in Ukraine accept the theory of evolution while 34 percent deny the theory of evolution and claim that "humans have always existed their present form."

=== Uruguay ===
According to a 2014 poll produced by the Pew Research Center, 74% of people in Uruguay believe "humans and other living things evolved over time" while 20% believe they have "always existed in the present form."

=== Venezuela ===
According to a 2014 poll by the Pew Research Center, 63% of people in Venezuela believe "humans and other living things evolved over time" while 33% believe they have "always existed in the present form."

== Other support for evolution ==
There are also many educational organizations that have issued statements in support of the theory of evolution.

Repeatedly, creationists and intelligent design advocates have lost suits in US courts. Here is a list of important court cases in which creationists have suffered setbacks:

- 1968 Epperson v. Arkansas, United States Supreme Court
- 1981 Segraves v. State of California, Supreme Court of California
- 1982 McLean v. Arkansas Board of Education, U.S. Federal Court
- 1987 Edwards v. Aguillard, United States Supreme Court
- 1990 Webster v. New Lenox School District, Seventh Circuit Court of Appeals
- 1994 Peloza v. Capistrano Unified School District, Ninth Circuit Court of Appeals
- 1997 Freiler v. Tangipahoa Parish Board of Education, United States District Court for the Eastern District of Louisiana
- 2000 Rodney LeVake v Independent School District 656, et al., District Court for the Third Judicial District of the State of Minnesota
- 2005 Kitzmiller v. Dover Area School District, US Federal Court
- 2006 Hurst v. Newman US District Court Eastern District of California

== Trends ==
The level of assent that evolution garners has changed with time. The trends in acceptance of evolution can be estimated.

=== Early impact of Darwin's theory ===
The level of support for evolution in different communities has varied with time and social context. Darwin's theory had convinced almost every naturalist within 20 years of its publication in 1858, and was making serious inroads with the public and the more liberal clergy. It had reached such extremes, that by 1880, one American religious weekly publication estimated that "perhaps a quarter, perhaps a half of the educated ministers in our leading Evangelical denominations" thought "that the story of the creation and fall of man, told in Genesis, is no more the record of actual occurrences than is the parable of the Prodigal Son."

By the late 19th century, many of the most conservative Christians accepted an ancient Earth, and life on Earth before Eden. Victorian Era Creationists were more akin to people who subscribe to theistic evolution today. Even fervent anti-evolutionist Scopes Trial prosecutor William Jennings Bryan interpreted the "days" of Genesis as ages of the Earth, and acknowledged that biochemical evolution took place, drawing the line only at the story of Adam and Eve's creation. Prominent pre-World War II creationist Harry Rimmer allowed an Old Earth by slipping millions of years into putative gaps in the Genesis account, and claimed that the Noachian Flood was only a local phenomenon.

In the decades of the 20th century, George McCready Price and a tiny group of Seventh-day Adventist followers were among the very few believers in a Young Earth and a worldwide flood, which Price championed in his "new catastrophism" theories. It was not until the publication of John C. Whitcomb, Jr., and Henry M. Morris’s book Genesis Flood in 1961 that Price's idea was revived. In the last few decades, many creationists have adopted Price's beliefs, becoming progressively more strict biblical literalists.

=== Recent public beliefs ===
In a 1991 Gallup poll, 47% of the US population, and 25% of college graduates agreed with the statement, "God created man pretty much in his present form at one time within the last 10,000 years."

Fourteen years later, in 2005, Gallup found that 53% of Americans expressed the belief that "God created human beings in their present form exactly the way the Bible describes it." About 2/3 (65.5%) of those surveyed thought that creationism was definitely or probably true. In 2005 a Newsweek poll discovered that 80 percent of the American public thought that "God created the universe." and the Pew Research Center reported that "nearly two-thirds of Americans say that creationism should be taught alongside evolution in public schools." Ronald Numbers commented on that with "Most surprising of all was the discovery that large numbers of high-school biology teachers — from 30% in Illinois and 38% in Ohio to a whopping 69% in Kentucky — supported the teaching of creationism."

The National Center for Science Education reports that from 1985 to 2005, the number of Americans unsure about evolution increased from 7% to 21%, while the number rejecting evolution declined from 48% to 39%. Jon Miller of Michigan State University has found in his polls that the number of Americans who accept evolution has declined from 45% to 40% from 1985 to 2005.

In light of these somewhat contradictory results, it is difficult to know for sure what is happening to public opinion on evolution in the US. It does not appear that either side is making unequivocal progress. It does appear that uncertainty about the issue is increasing, however.

A Pew Research Center poll in 2018 found that the way the question is asked changes the results, for instance among U.S. adults the number of people who believe humans have evolved over time varies from 68% to 81% based on the question format.

Anecdotal evidence suggests that creationism is gaining ground in the UK as well. One report in 2006 stated that UK students are increasingly arriving ill-prepared to participate in medical studies or other advanced education.

=== Recent scientific trends ===
The level of support for creationism among relevant scientists is minimal. In 2007 the Discovery Institute reported that about 600 scientists signed their A Scientific Dissent from Darwinism list, up from 100 in 2001. The actual statement of the Scientific Dissent from Darwinism is a relatively mild one that expresses skepticism about the absoluteness of 'Darwinism' (and is in line with the falsifiability required of scientific theories) to explain all features of life, and does not in any way represent an absolute denial or rejection of evolution. By contrast, a tongue-in-cheek response known as Project Steve, a list restricted to scientists with the name Steve (or variations of it) who agree that evolution is "a vital, well-supported, unifying principle of the biological sciences," has 1,501 signatories as of 1st April, 2025. People with these names make up approximately 1% of the total U.S. population.

The United States National Science Foundation statistics on US yearly science graduates demonstrate that from 1987 to 2001, the number of biological science graduates increased by 59% while the number of geological science graduates decreased by 20.5%. However, the number of geology graduates in 2001 was only 5.4% of the number of graduates in the biological sciences, while it was 10.7% of the number of biological science graduates in 1987. The Science Resources Statistics Division of the National Science Foundation estimated that in 1999, there were 955,300 biological scientists in the US (about 1/3 of who hold graduate degrees). There were also 152,800 earth scientists in the US as well.

A large fraction of the Darwin Dissenters have specialties unrelated to research on evolution; of the dissenters, three-quarters are not biologists. As of 2006, the dissenter list was expanded to include non-US scientists.

Some researchers are attempting to understand the factors that affect people's acceptance of evolution. Studies have yielded inconsistent results, explains associate professor of education at Ohio State University, David Haury. He recently performed a study that found people are likely to reject evolution if they have feelings of uncertainty, regardless of how well they understand evolutionary theory. Haury believes that teachers need to show students that their intuitive feelings may be misleading (for example, using the Wason selection task), and thus to exercise caution when relying on them as they judge the rational merits of ideas.

== See also ==
- History of creationism
- List of scientific societies rejecting intelligent design
- Relationship between science and religion
