= List of scientific bodies explicitly rejecting intelligent design =

This article lists those scientific organisations and other nationally or internationally recognised groups that specifically reject intelligent design as a valid alternative to evolutionary theory.

== United States ==
=== National ===
- The American Association for the Advancement of Science is the world's largest general scientific society. The AAAS serves some 262 affiliated societies and academies of science, serving 10 million individuals.
  - A 2002 statement states: "[T]he lack of scientific warrant for so-called 'intelligent design theory' makes it improper to include as a part of science education."
  - A 2006 statement on the teaching of evolution: "Some bills seek to discredit evolution by emphasizing so-called "flaws" in the theory of evolution or "disagreements" within the scientific community. Others insist that teachers have absolute freedom within their classrooms and cannot be disciplined for teaching non-scientific "alternatives" to evolution. A number of bills require that students be taught to "critically analyze" evolution or to understand "the controversy." But there is no significant controversy within the scientific community about the validity of the theory of evolution. The current controversy surrounding the teaching of evolution is not a scientific one."
  - Q & A on Evolution and Intelligent Design: Is intelligent design a scientific alternative to contemporary evolutionary theory? No. Intelligent design proponents may use the language of science, but they do not use its methodology. They have yet to propose meaningful tests for their claims, there are no reports of current research on these hypotheses at relevant scientific society meetings, and there is no body of research on these hypotheses published in relevant scientific journals. So, intelligent design has not been demonstrated to be a scientific theory.
- American Association of University Professors is an organization of professors and other academics in the United States. AAUP membership is about 47,000, with over 500 local campus chapters and 39 state organizations.
  - "deplores efforts in local communities and by some state legislators to require teachers in public schools to treat evolution as merely a hypothesis or speculation, untested and unsubstantiated by the methods of science, and to require them to make students aware of an 'intelligent-design hypothesis' to account for the origins of life. These initiatives not only violate the academic freedom of public school teachers, but can deny students an understanding of the overwhelming scientific consensus regarding evolution."
  - Regarding Academic Freedom bills: "Such efforts run counter to the overwhelming scientific consensus regarding evolution and are inconsistent with a proper understanding of the meaning of academic freedom."
- American Astronomical Society is an American society of professional astronomers and other interested individuals, with over 7,000 members and six divisions.
  - 2005 letter sent to President George W. Bush by society President, Dr. Robert P. Kirshner: "'Intelligent design' isn't even part of science – it is a religious idea that doesn't have a place in the science curriculum."
  - 2005 statement on the Teaching of Evolution: "'Intelligent Design' fails to meet the basic definition of a scientific idea: its proponents do not present testable hypotheses and do not provide evidence for their views that can be verified or duplicated by subsequent researchers. Since 'Intelligent Design' is not science, it does not belong in the science curriculum of the nation's primary and secondary schools."
- American Chemical Society is a scientific society that supports scientific inquiry in the field of chemistry, with more than 164,000 members at all degree-levels and in all fields of chemistry, chemical engineering, and related fields. It is the world's largest scientific society and one of the leading sources of authoritative scientific information.
  - "urges... State and local education authorities to support high-quality science standards and curricula that affirm evolution as the only scientifically accepted explanation for the origin and diversity of species."
- American Geophysical Union The AGU represents over 43,000 Earth and space scientists. "Advocates of intelligent design believe that life on Earth is too complex to have evolved on its own and must therefore be the work of a designer. That is an untestable belief and, therefore, cannot qualify as a scientific theory."
- American Institute of Physics has a Governing Board policy statement supporting evolution and opposing creationism.
- American Psychological Association The Science Directorate and the APA Council of Representatives issued a Resolution Rejecting Intelligent Design As Scientific And Reaffirming Support For Evolutionary Theory.
- American Society of Agronomy The ASA represents over 10,000 members. "Intelligent design is not a scientific discipline and should not be taught as part of the K-12 science curriculum. Intelligent design has neither the substantial research base, nor the testable hypotheses as a scientific discipline. There are at least 70 resolutions from a broad array of scientific societies and institutions that are united on this matter."
- American Society for Biochemistry and Molecular Biology The ASBMB is a scientific and educational society representing 12,000 biochemists and molecular biologists. ""Intelligent design" is not a theory in the scientific sense, nor is it a scientific alternative to the theory of evolution. ..."intelligent design" might be appropriate to teach in a religion or philosophy class, but the concept has no place in a science classroom and should not be taught there." The president of the society wrote, "Their [religious fundamentalists'] latest ploy masquerades as "critical thinking" or "freedom of expression" and takes the form of laws prohibiting someone from being dismissed from his or her job for teaching the alleged controversy about evolution, by which they mean that it's perfectly OK for a so-called science teacher to present creationism, intelligent design and other Bible-in-science-clothing religious doctrines as legitimate alternatives to evolution, even though anyone who does so ought to be fired for incompetence."
- Botanical Society of America "The proponents of creationism/intelligent design promote scientific ignorance in the guise of learning. As professional scientists and educators, we strongly assert that such efforts are both misguided and flawed, presenting an incorrect view of science, its understandings, and its processes."
- Federation of American Societies for Experimental Biology The Federation represents 22 professional societies and 84,000 scientists, and its statement FASEB Opposes Using Science Classes to Teach Intelligent Design, Creationism, and other Non-Scientific Beliefs was adopted by the FASEB Board of Directors.
- National Association of Biology Teachers "Scientists have firmly established evolution as an important natural process. ... Explanations or ways of knowing that invoke metaphysical, non-naturalistic or supernatural mechanisms, whether called "creation science," "scientific creationism," "intelligent design theory," "young earth theory," or similar designations, are outside the scope of science and therefore are not part of a valid science curriculum." - Adopted by the NABT Board of Directors, 1995. Revised 1997, 2000, May 2004, and 2008. Endorsed by: The Society for the Study of Evolution, 1998; The American Association of Physical Anthropologists, 1998.
- The National Center for Science Education itself opposes the teaching of intelligent design, acting as a clearinghouse for information regarding efforts to force creationism (including intelligent design) into the classroom. The NCSE describes intelligent design as "a successor to the "creation science" movement, which dates back to the 1960s...The term "intelligent design" was adopted as a replacement for "creation science," which was ruled to represent a particular religious belief in the Supreme Court case Edwards v. Aguillard in 1987. IDC proponents usually avoid explicit references to God, attempting to present a veneer of secular scientific inquiry. IDC proponents introduced some new phrases into anti-evolution rhetoric...but the basic principles behind these phrases have long histories in creationist attacks on evolution. Underlying both of these concepts, and foundational to IDC itself, is an early 19th-century British theological view, the 'argument from design.'" The NCSE also maintains lists of organizations from around the world that oppose the teaching of creationism, including intelligent design, listing 71 scientific organizations, 23 religious organizations, 43 educational organizations, and 10 civil liberties organizations.
- The National Science Teachers Association NSTA is a professional association of 55,000 science teachers and administrators. "We stand with the nation's leading scientific organizations and scientists, including Dr. John Marburger, the president's top science advisor, in stating that intelligent design is not science. … It is simply not fair to present pseudoscience to students in the science classroom."
- United States National Academy of Sciences
  - The academy wrote a statement entitled "Science and Creationism: A View from the National Academy of Sciences, Second Edition National Academy of Sciences" which said that "Creationism, Intelligent Design, and other claims of supernatural intervention in the origin of life or of species are not science".
  - There was also a letter from Bruce Alberts, former president, NAS: "We stand ready to help others in addressing the increasingly strident attempts to limit the teaching of evolution or to introduce non-scientific 'alternatives' into science courses and curricula. If this controversy arrives at your doorstep, I hope that you will both alert us to the specific issues in your state or school district and be willing to use your position and prestige as a member of the NAS in helping to work locally."

=== State and university ===
- Kentucky Academy of Science states "...in the strongest and most determined ways possible deplores the decision to substitute "change over time" for "evolution" in the state teaching standards, urges that the original wording be reinstated, and decries any attempt to remove the teaching of basic evolutionary theory..." Adopted by KAS Governing Board November 6, 1999. Passed unanimously by KAS membership November 6, 1999. Unanimously approved again at its annual business meeting on November 11, 2005. The KAS also voted to endorse the October 2002 AAAS Board Resolution on Intelligent Design Theory.
- The Kentucky Paleontological Society Statement on Teaching Evolution states that "KPS is opposed to any attempt to teach creationism or omit mention of evolution from public school instruction. Furthermore, evolution should be called "evolution" in curriculum guidelines and other documents; euphemisms such as "change over time" are intellectually dishonest for they attempt to conceal the terminology used by scientists." Executive Committee approved this statement in 1999.
- The Lehigh University Department of Biological Sciences responded to faculty member and intelligent design proponent Michael Behe's claims about the scientific validity and usefulness of intelligent design, publishing an official position statement which says "It is our collective position that intelligent design has no basis in science, has not been tested experimentally, and should not be regarded as scientific."

== Other countries and international bodies ==
- Elie Wiesel Foundation for Humanity Nobel Laureates Initiative. This organization has 38 Nobel laureates, who wrote a letter calling upon the Kansas Board of Education to reject intelligent design. "Logically derived from confirmable evidence, evolution is understood to be the result of an unguided, unplanned process of random variation and natural selection. As the foundation of modern biology, its indispensable role has been further strengthened by the capacity to study DNA. In contrast, intelligent design is fundamentally unscientific; it cannot be tested as scientific theory because its central conclusion is based on belief in the intervention of a supernatural agent."
- Council of Europe. In 2007 the council's "Committee on Culture, Science and Education" issued a report, The dangers of creationism in education, which states "The intelligent design ideas annihilate any research process. It identifies difficulties and immediately jumps to the conclusion that the only way to resolve them is to resort to an intelligent cause without looking for other explanations. It is thus unacceptable to want to teach it in science courses. It is not enough to present it as an alternative theory in order to have it included in the science syllabus. In order to claim to be scientific, it is only necessary to refer to natural causes in one's explanations. The intelligent design ideas, however, only refers to supernatural causes" and ""Intelligent design", which is the latest, more refined version of creationism, does not completely deny a degree of evolution. However, this school of thought has hardly provided any fuel for the scientific debate up to now. Though more subtle in its presentation, the doctrine of intelligent design is no less dangerous".
- Intelligent Design is not Science Initiative. This initiative was brought forth by a coalition organized by the Faculty of Science at the University of New South Wales representing more than 70,000 Australian scientists and science teachers with signatories from the Australian Academy of Science, the Federation of Australian Scientific and Technological Societies, and the Australian Science Teachers Association. "(Intelligent design) is a theological or philosophical notion... Evolution meets all (scientific) criteria but ID meets none of them: it is not science."
- Interacademy Panel Statement on the Teaching of Evolution. This is a joint statement issued by the national science academies of 67 countries, including the United Kingdom's Royal Society, warning that scientific evidence about the origins of life was being "concealed, denied, or confused". It urges parents and teachers to provide children with the facts about the origins and evolution of life on Earth.
- The International Society for Science and Religion declared that "[w]e believe that intelligent design is neither sound science nor good theology."
- Project Steve. A statement signed by 1200 scientists, all named Steve. "It is scientifically inappropriate and pedagogically irresponsible for creationist pseudoscience, including but not limited to "intelligent design," to be introduced into the science curricula of our nation's public schools."
- The Royal Astronomical Society of Canada, Ottawa Centre, said, "The RASC Ottawa Centre, then, is unequivocal in its support of contemporary evolutionary theory that has its roots in the seminal work of Charles Darwin and has been refined by findings accumulated over 140 years. Some dissenters from this position are proponents of non-scientific explanations of the nature of the universe. These may include "creation science", "creationism", "intelligent design" or other non-scientific "alternatives to evolution". While we respect the dissenters’ right to express their views, these views are theirs alone and are in no way endorsed by the RASC Ottawa Centre. It is our collective position that these explanations do not meet the characteristics and rigour of scientific empiricism."
- The Royal Society "opposes the misrepresentation of evolution in schools to promote particular religious beliefs" and states "intelligent design has far more in common with a religious belief in creationism than it has with science, which is based on evidence acquired through experiment and observation. The theory of evolution is supported by the weight of scientific evidence; the theory of intelligent design is not."

== See also ==
- Creation–evolution controversy
- Level of support for evolution
