= LeVake v. Independent School District 656 =

2000 court case in Minnesota

- Court: Minnesota Court of Appeals
- Full case name: Rodney LeVake, Appellant, v. Independent School District #656; Keith Dixon, Superintendent; Dave Johnson, Principal; and Cheryl Freund, Curriculum Director, Respondents.
- Decided: May 8, 2001
- Citation: 625 N.W.2d 502 (Mn. Ct. App. 2001)

Case history
- Appealed from: Minnesota District Court
- Appealed to: Minnesota Supreme Court (review denied); Supreme Court of the United States (certiorari denied)

Court membership
- Judges sitting: Randolph W. Peterson, Robert H. Schumacher, Daniel F. Foley (Note: Temporary appointment)

Case opinions
- Decision by: Foley
- Concurrence: Peterson, Schumacher

Keywords
- Creationism; Evolution

LeVake v. Independent School District 656 was a 2000 court case heard in a Minnesota State District Court and appealed to the Minnesota Court of Appeals. The case was brought by high school biology teacher Rodney LeVake who had been told by the Faribault Public Schools that he could not teach the "evidence both for and against the theory" of evolution. After learning that he wanted to teach "criticisms of evolution" to his pupils, school officials reassigned him to teach a different class.

In his complaint, LeVake claimed violations of his rights to free exercise of religion, free speech, procedural due process, freedom of conscience, and academic freedom. The district court granted summary judgment for the school district, and on appeal the Minnesota Court of Appeals affirmed that judgment, finding that the record showed that the teacher "refused to teach his assigned class in the manner prescribed by the established curriculum" and that summary judgment was appropriate as he had not shown a violation of his rights. LeVake sought further review by the Minnesota Supreme Court and then by the Supreme Court of the United States; both denied review.
