= Kentucky Academy of Science =

Coordinates: 38.257638°N 85.762687°W

Kentucky Academy of Science (KAS) is the Kentucky affiliate of the American Association for the Advancement of Science and the National Association of Academies of Science. The organization "fosters scientific discovery and understanding in Kentucky". It is a statewide scientific society serving scientists and science advocates. Projects include various outreach initiatives to advance science literacy in Kentucky and policy advocacy around scientific and educational issues. The KAS has passed resolutions in favor of evolution in 1981, 1983, 1999, and 2005, and have stood up against a series of legislative efforts in Kentucky to undermine science education

== History ==
Kentucky Academy of Science was organized on May 8, 1914, by a group of 46 Kentucky scientists and interested laypersons. In 2014, a 100-year history was written, which included past presidents and other board members. Below is a part of the list from 1976 until today:

1976–1977 Charles Payne, Morehead State University
1977–1978 Charles E. Kupchella, University of Louisville
1978–1979 Sanford L. Jones, Eastern Kentucky University
1979–1980 Rudolph Prins, Western Kentucky University
1980–1981 John C. Philley, Morehead State University
1981–1982 Ted M. George, Eastern Kentucky University
1982–1983 J G. Rodriguez, University of Kentucky
1983–1984 Gary Boggess, Murray State University
1984–1985 Joe Winstead, Western Kentucky University
1985–1986 Charles Covell, University of Louisville
1986–1987 Larry Giesmann, Northern Kentucky University
1987–1988 William P. Hettinger, Ashland Petroleum Company
1988–1989 Richard Hannan, Kentucky Nature Preserves Commission
1989–1990 Debra K. Pearce, Northern Kentucky University
1990–1991 W. Blaine Early, III, Cumberland College
1991–1992 Douglas L. Dahlman, University of Kentucky
1992–1993 Charles N. Boehms, Georgetown College
1993–1994 Larry Elliott, Western Kentucky University
1994–1995 Robert Creek, Eastern Kentucky University
1995–1996 William S. Bryant, Thomas More College
1996–1997 Marcus T. McEllistrem, University of Kentucky
1997–1998 Patricia K. Doolin, Ashland Petroleum Company
1998–1999 Gordon K. Weddle, Campbellsville University
1999–2000 Blaine Ferrell, Western Kentucky University
2000–2001 Ron Rosen, Berea College
2001–2002 Jerry Warner, Northern Kentucky University
2002–2003 Robert Barney, Kentucky State University
2003–2004 Robert Kingsolver, Kentucky Wesleyan College
2004–2005 Bruce Mattingly, Morehead State University
2005–2006 Miriam Steinitz-Kannan, Northern Kentucky University
2006–2007 Nigel Cooper, University of Louisville
2007–2008 John Mateja, Murray State University
2008–2009 Robin Cooper, University of Kentucky
2009–2010 Nancy Martin, University of Louisville
2010–2011 Barbara Ramey, Eastern Kentucky University
2011–2012 Dawn Anderson, Berea College
2012–2013 Cheryl Davis, Western Kentucky University
2013–2014 K. C. Russell, Northern Kentucky University
2014–2015 David White, Murray State University
2016
2017 Darrin Smith, Eastern Kentucky University
2018 Jennifer Birriel, Morehead State University
2019 Leslie North, Western Kentucky University
2020 Frank Ettensohn, University of Kentucky
2021 Trent Garrison, Kentucky Community and Technical College
2022 Jon Dixon
2023 Julie Reizner, Northern Kentucky University
2024 Noel Novelo, Kentucky State University
2025
2026

== Current activities ==
The Kentucky Academy of Science, with more than 4000 members, "fosters scientific discovery and understanding in Kentucky." KAS provides funds for scientific research and outreach through grants including the Marcia Athey and Botany Funds, Special Research Program, and Undergraduate Research Program.

The Journal of the Kentucky Academy of Science, the academy's official journal, is published in the Spring and Fall each year.

KAS sponsors the Kentucky Junior Academy of Science each April, for middle and high school students engaged in research. Students with winning presentations are eligible to represent Kentucky as delegates at the American Junior Academy of Science meeting the following February.

KAS' Annual Meeting each fall convenes hundreds of scientists and students from around the state and region to present their latest research.

KAS operates the Kentucky Science Speakers Bureau, offering expert scientists at no cost to civic organizations, educators, or others, to share their knowledge on a variety of issues.

KAS is also active in promoting science literacy through a partnership with the Kentucky Science Center, and does state-level policy advocacy around science and education.

In 2021, KAS hired a policy and communications director to help with its push to become a stronger voice for Kentucky science policy.

During the 2005 KAS annual meeting, members voted unanimously to oppose any attempt by the Kentucky legislature or other legislative bodies to mandate specific content of science courses. The KAS specifically objects to legislation that equates "scientific creationism" or "intelligent design" with evolution as a scientific explanation. The KAS has passed resolutions in favor of evolution in 1981, 1983, 1999, and 2005.
