= Segraves v. California =

Superior Court of California case concerning the teaching of evolutionary biology

Segraves v. State of California
- Court: Superior Court of California, County of Sacramento
- Full case name: Kasey Segraves, Jason Segraves and Kevin Segraves, minors under 14 years of age, by their Guardian ad litem, Kelly Segraves, William Dannemeyer, Michael D. Antonovich, Eugene N. Ragle and Creation Science Research Center, Plaintiffs, v. State of California, Board of Education of the State of California, Department of Education of the State of California, Department of General Services, Wilson Riles, Kenneth Cory, Jessie Unruh and DOES 1 through 50, inclusive, Defendants.
- Decided: 1981

Segraves v. California was a 1981 Superior Court of California case concerning the teaching of evolutionary biology in public schools. Kelly Segraves, a parent of three schoolchildren, sued the State of California, arguing that the teaching of evolution in public schools violated the Free Exercise Clause of the First Amendment to the United States Constitution. The judge rejected this claim and found that California's anti-dogmatism policy gave sufficient accommodation to the views of Segraves.

== Background ==
Kelly Segraves is a father of three and cofounder of the Creation-Science Research Center in San Diego. His three children, Kasey, Jason, and Kevin, attended a California public school, where part of the curriculum included the teachings of evolution. Segraves contended that the teaching of religion at his children's public school violated their freedom to practice religion, and thus, infringed upon their First Amendment rights. Segraves sued California on behalf of his three children, who were minors at the time, on January 19, 1979. Cited in Segraves's complaint is the curriculum guide "Science Framework for California Public Schools", which is said to convey the idea that "the theory of evolution is the only credible theory of the origin of [life]."

The case went to trial in 1981, putting evolution and creationism on opposite sides of another courtroom battle. In court, Segraves argued that teaching the theory of evolution in public schools was "'indoctrination' and 'coercion'" against his and his children's religious beliefs and that it violated their right to religious freedom. The plaintiff also argued that teaching the evolutionary theory in public schools established and supported "the religion of secular humanism", which violates the First Amendment's establishment clause. Because of this assertion, Segraves also claimed that teaching evolution goes against a section of the California constitution that outlaws the spending of public money for the support of any religion in public schools.

== Decision ==
In March 1981, after one week of testimony, presiding Judge Irving Perluss ruled that the teaching of evolution in public schools did not infringe upon the First Amendment rights of Segraves and his children. Perluss's decision included a reference to a 1972 "anti-dogmatism" policy, which states:

"The decision states that the anti-dogmatism policy should be made known to any organization or person who would receive the Science Framework for California Public Schools."

The decision states that the anti-dogmatism policy should be made known to any organization or person who would receive the Science Framework for California Public Schools.
