= Webster v. New Lenox School District =

Court case in Illinois

- Court: United States Court of Appeals for the Seventh Circuit
- Full case name: Ray Webster v. New Lenox School District No. 122, et al
- Argued: February 27 1990
- Decided: November 6 1990
- Citations: 917 F.2d 1004 (7th Cir. 1990); 63 Ed. Law Rep. 749

Case history
- Prior history: 88-C-2328 (N.D. Ill.)

Court membership
- Judges sitting: Joel Martin Flaum, Frank H. Easterbrook, Kenneth Francis Ripple

Case opinions
- Majority: Ripple, joined by a unanimous court

Laws applied
- First Amendment

Webster v. New Lenox School District, 917 F.2d 1004 (7th Cir. 1990) was a court case in Illinois, in which a social studies teacher Ray Webster sued the New Lenox School District 122 in New Lenox, Illinois, which he accused of violating his First Amendment right to free speech for stopping him from teaching "creation science" in class. The court found however that the school district had a right to restrict Webster to teaching the specified curriculum, and that in any case the teaching of "creation science" was illegal, having been ruled to violate the Establishment Clause in the U.S. Supreme Court decision in Edwards v. Aguillard, 482 U.S. 578 (1987).

The case hinged on the school district's "pedagogical interest in establishing the curriculum and legitimate concern with possible establishment clause violations".

Webster appealed and the United States Court of Appeals for the Seventh Circuit affirmed the District Court's original decision deciding "teaching creation science for any reason was a form of religious advocacy."
