= Project Steve =

Scientists named Steve who support evolution

Project Steve is a list of scientists with the given name Stephen or Steven or a variation thereof (e.g., Stephanie, Stefan, Esteban, etc.) who "support evolution". It was originally created by the National Center for Science Education as a "tongue-in-cheek parody" of creationist attempts to collect a list of scientists who "doubt evolution", such as the Answers in Genesis's list of scientists who accept the biblical account of the Genesis creation narrative or the Discovery Institute's A Scientific Dissent From Darwinism. The list pokes fun at such endeavors while making it clear that, "We did not wish to mislead the public into thinking that scientific issues are decided by who has the longer list of scientists!" It also honors Stephen Jay Gould. The level of support for evolution among scientists is very high. A 2009 poll by Pew Research Center found that "[n]early all scientists (97%) say humans and other living things have evolved over time."

However, at the same time the project is a genuine collection of scientists. Despite the list's restriction to only scientists with names like "Steve", which it turns out is roughly 1 percent of scientists, Project Steve is longer and contains many more eminent scientists than any creationist list. In particular, Project Steve contains many more biologists than the creationist lists, with about 54% of the listed Steves being biologists. The "List of Steves" webpage provides an updated total of scientist "Steves" who have signed the list. As of August 3, 2026, Project Steve has 1,514 signatories.

== Statement ==
The statement that signatories agree to reads:

Evolution is a vital, well-supported, unifying principle of the biological sciences, and the scientific evidence is overwhelmingly in favor of the idea that all living things share a common ancestry. Although there are legitimate debates about the patterns and processes of evolution, there is no serious scientific doubt that evolution occurred or that natural selection is a major mechanism in its occurrence. It is scientifically inappropriate and pedagogically irresponsible for creationist pseudoscience, including but not limited to "intelligent design", to be introduced into the science curricula of our nation's public schools.

There have been some complaints that the statement left out the geological sciences, where evolution is an important principle as well. However, this oversight was noticed too late and it was decided that it would be more effort than it is worth to go back to correct it.

== History ==
The project was named in honor of the paleontologist and essayist Stephen Jay Gould (1941–2002). It began in 2003, with an official press release on February 16, 2003. The press release was issued at the American Association for the Advancement of Science's 2003 convention in Denver, Colorado, after a lecture by Lawrence Krauss titled "Scientific Ignorance as a Way of Life: From Science Fiction in Washington to Intelligent Design in the Classroom." Krauss made the actual announcement and directed the reporters to NCSE Director Eugenie Scott, who was sitting in the audience in the front row.

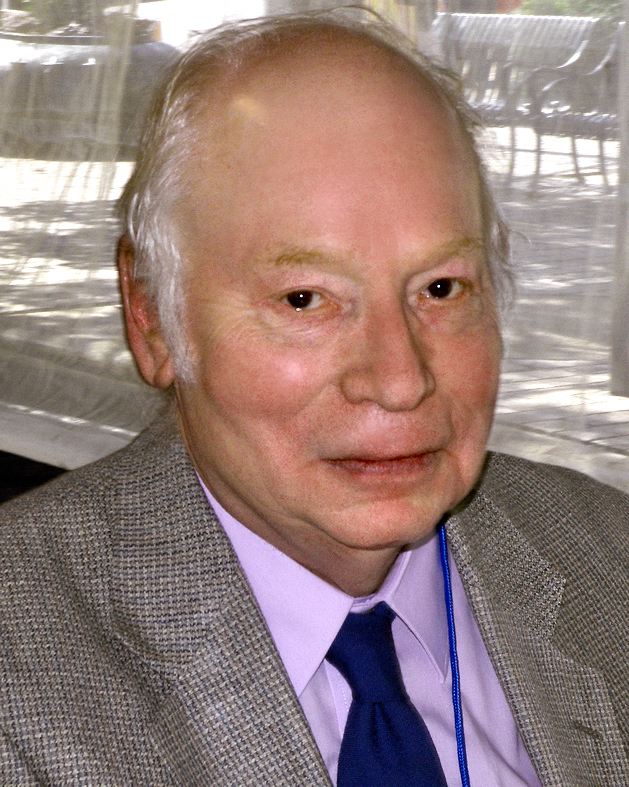
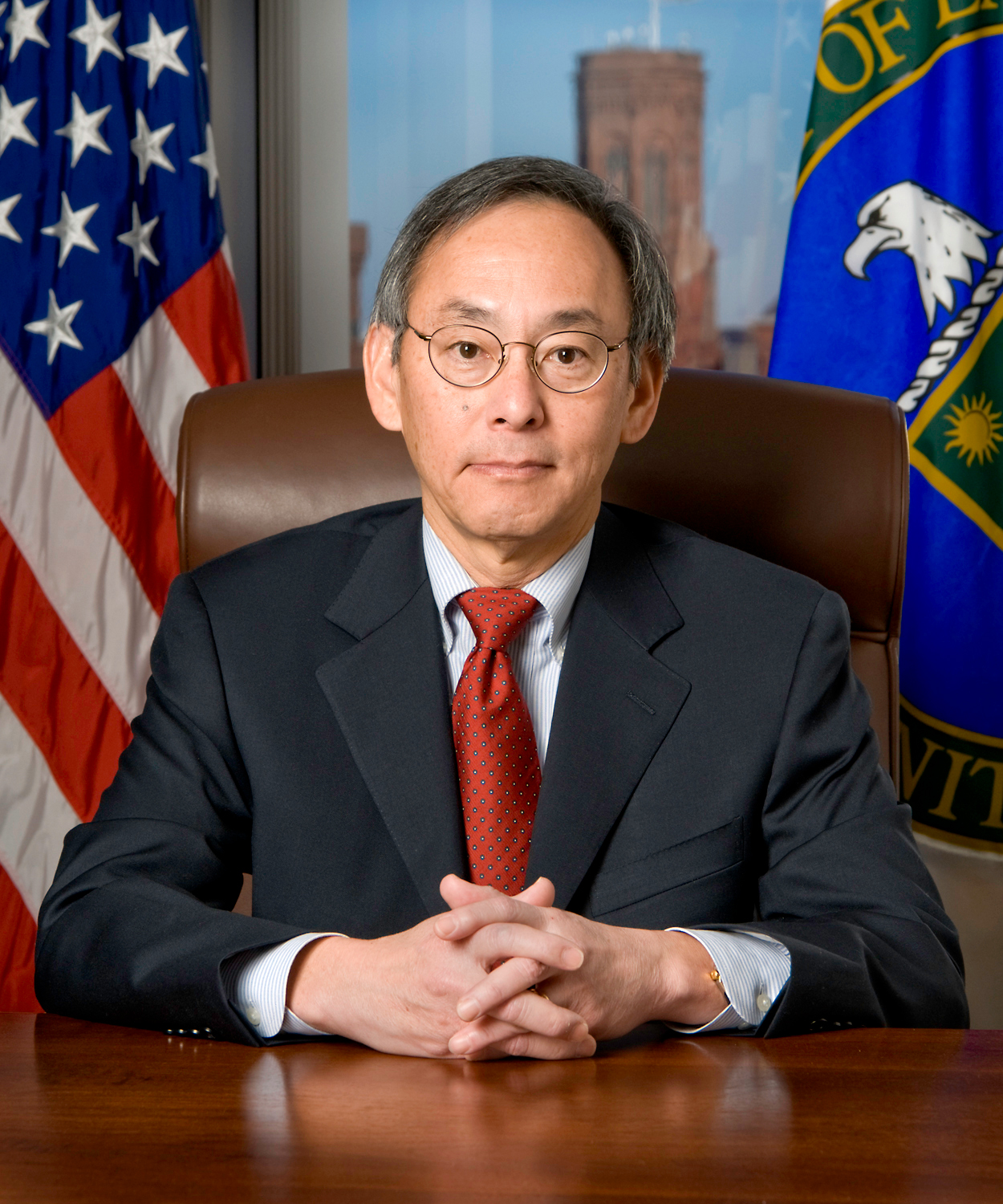
Nobel laureates Steven Weinberg (left) and Steven Chu (right) were among the first 100 signatures.

The original goal was to collect the signatures of 100 Steves, but this goal was reached in about 10 days. Both Nobel Prize-winning Steves in science — Steven Weinberg and Steven Chu (who has since served as Secretary of Energy in Barack Obama's Cabinet) — were among the first 100 Steves. Over 200 Steves responded in the first month. As the news of Project Steve spread by word of mouth, ever-increasing numbers of Steves contacted the NCSE, and the list continued to grow.

Project Steve captured the attention of the media. The first media coverage included articles in the Washington Times, Science, the Oakland Tribune and an interview of NCSE director Eugenie Scott by Australian science journalist and radio broadcaster Robyn Williams for the Australian Broadcasting Corporation’s radio show, The Science Show. The Science Show arranged for Geoff Sirmai and David Fisher of the Australian musical comedy team "Comic Roasts" to write the "Steve Song", a parody of the Monty Python song about Spam, for Project Steve. The song had its debut on The Science Show episode featuring the interview of Scott which aired on Australian Broadcasting Corporation Radio National on March 8, 2003.

Cambridge University Lucasian Professor of Mathematics Stephen Hawking was the 300th Steve to sign the list. By the time the announcement was made on April 21, 2003, another five had joined to bring the total number of Steves to 305. By December 26, 2003, Saint Stephen's Day, Project Steve had grown to 400 scientists.

As Project Steve reached the 400 scientist mark, the NCSE decided to offer a commemorative novelty Project Steve t-shirt. The t-shirt is emblazoned with the proclamation, "Over _00 Scientists named Steve Agree, Teach Evolution!" in large letters, where the blank contains the most recent hundreds mark. A list of the current signatories is included in a smaller typeface on the t-shirt as well.

Eugenie Scott, Glenn Branch and Nick Matzke published an article in the July/August 2004 issue of the Annals of Improbable Research (with all the Steves that had signed up to that point listed as co-authors) called The Morphology of Steve which contained "the first scientific analysis of the sex, geographic location, and body size of scientists named Steve". The data were obtained using NCSE's "pioneering experimental steveometry apparatus"—the t-shirt.

Shortly after the second anniversary of Project Steve in February 2005, 543 Steves had signed the list. A front-page story in the Ottawa Citizen marking this event was published on February 20, 2005. On September 12, 2005, the 600th Steve signed the list. By February 16, 2006, the third anniversary of Project Steve's official launch, the Steve-o-meter stood at 700. On April 24, 2007, the list had grown to 800 Steves. In February 2009, the milestone #1000 was assigned to professor of ecology and evolutionary biology Steven P. Darwin (no relation to Charles). Subsequent milestones were #1100 on August 25, 2009, #1200 on April 6, 2012, and #1300 on January 15, 2014.

There have been articles about Project Steve in The Times, Scientific American, Yale Daily News, Focus on the Family's Family News in Focus, The Guardian, MIT's TechTalk, and The Arizona Republic, among many others.

=== Evolution ===
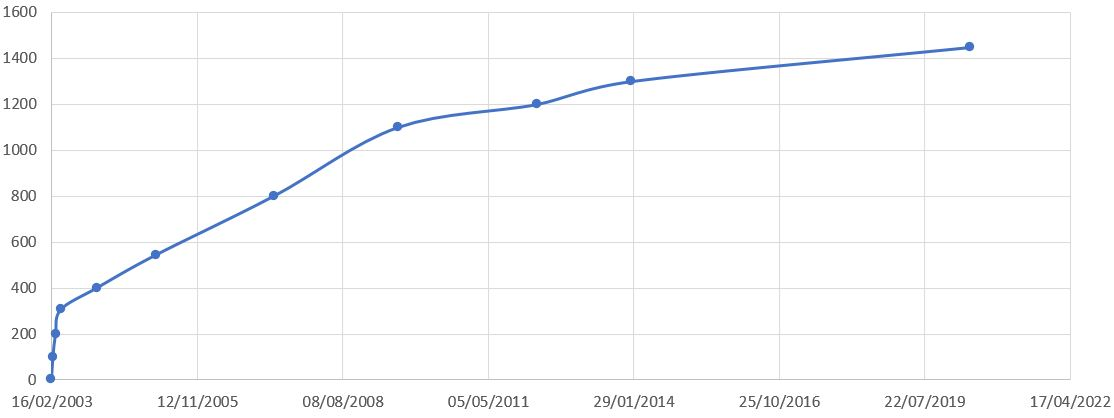
Evolution of the number of Steves within Project Steve since its creation

== Reactions ==
William Dembski, fellow of the Discovery Institute, whose "Scientific Dissent from Darwinism" petition had eight Steves as of July, 2007, has said that:

If Project Steve was meant to show that a considerable majority of the scientific community accepts a naturalistic conception of evolution, then the National Center for Science Education (NCSE) could have saved its energies—that fact was never in question. The more interesting question was whether any serious scientists reject a naturalistic conception of evolution.

Inspired by Project Steve, and motivated by media coverage of the Discovery Institute's "Dissent From Darwinism" list, during the Kitzmiller v. Dover Area School District case, R. Joe Brandon initiated a four-day, word-of-mouth petition of scientists in support of evolution in October 2005. During the four-day drive A Scientific Support For Darwinism And For Public Schools Not To Teach Intelligent Design As Science gathered 7733 signatures of verifiable scientists. During the four days of the petition, A Scientific Support for Darwinism received signatures at a rate 697,000% higher than the Discovery Institute's petition, A Scientific Dissent from Darwinism, according to archaeologist R. Joe Brandon.

== See also ==
- A Scientific Support for Darwinism
- Clergy Letter Project
- Evidence of common descent
- Level of support for evolution
