= Objections to evolution =

Objections to evolution have been raised since evolutionary ideas came to prominence in the 19th century. When Charles Darwin published his 1859 book On the Origin of Species, his theory of evolution (the idea that species arose through descent with modification from a single common ancestor in a process driven by natural selection) initially met opposition from scientists with different theories, but eventually came to receive near-universal acceptance in the scientific community. The observation of evolutionary processes occurring (as well as the modern evolutionary synthesis explaining that evidence) has been uncontroversial among mainstream biologists since the 1940s.

Since then, criticisms and denials of evolution have come from religious groups, rather than from the scientific community. Although many religious groups have found reconciliation of their beliefs with evolution, such as through theistic evolution, other religious groups continue to reject evolutionary explanations in favor of creationism, the belief that the universe and life were created by supernatural forces. The U.S.-centered rejection of evolution by religious groups has become a focal point of perceived conflict between religion and science.

Several branches of creationism, including creation science, neo-creationism, geocentric creationism and intelligent design, argue that the idea of life being directly designed by a god or intelligence is at least as scientific as evolutionary theory, and should therefore be taught in public education. Such arguments against evolution have become widespread and include objections to evolution's evidence, methodology, plausibility, morality, and scientific acceptance. The scientific community does not recognize such objections as valid, pointing to detractors' misinterpretations of such things as the scientific method, evidence, and basic physical laws.

== History ==
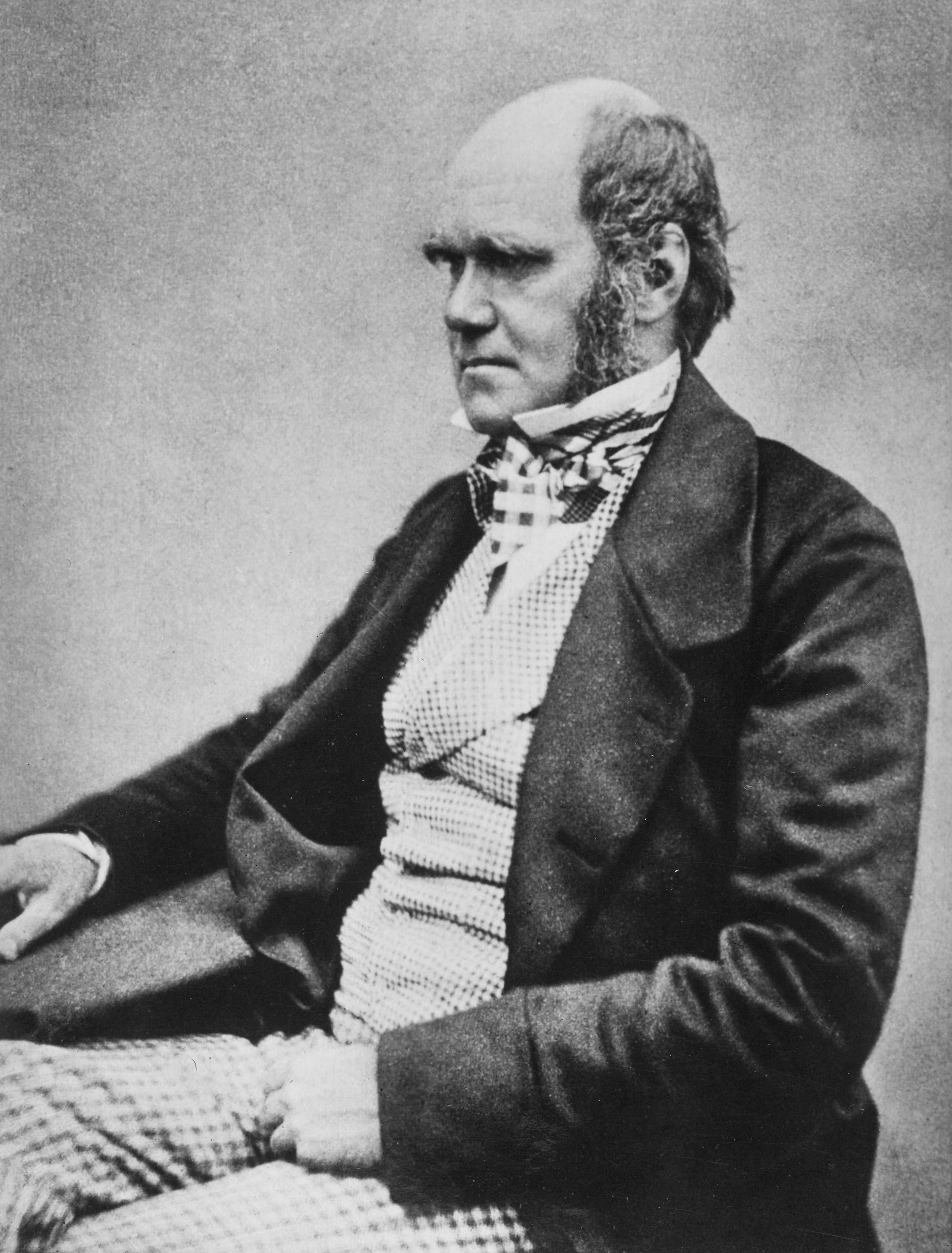
Charles Darwin's theory of evolution gained widespread acceptance as a description of the origin of species, but there was continued resistance to his views on the significance of natural selection as the mechanism of evolution.

Evolutionary ideas came to prominence in the early 19th century with the theory (developed between 1800 and 1822) of the transmutation of species put forward by Jean-Baptiste Lamarck (1744–1829). The scientific community initially opposed the idea of evolution, with notable criticism from Georges Cuvier (1769–1832). The idea that laws control nature and society gained vast popular audiences with George Combe's The Constitution of Man of 1828 and with the anonymous Vestiges of the Natural History of Creation of 1844. When Charles Darwin published his 1859 book On the Origin of Species, he convinced most of the scientific community that new species arise through descent through modification in a branching pattern of divergence from common ancestors, but while most scientists accepted natural selection as a valid and empirically testable hypothesis, Darwin's view of it as the primary mechanism of evolution was rejected by some.

Darwin's contemporaries eventually came to accept the transmutation of species based upon fossil evidence, and the X Club (operative from 1864 to 1893) formed to defend the concept of evolution against opposition from the church and wealthy amateurs. At that time the specific evolutionary mechanism which Darwin provided – natural selection – was actively disputed by scientists in favour of alternative theories such as Lamarckism and orthogenesis. Darwin's gradualistic account was also opposed by the ideas of saltationism and catastrophism. Lord Kelvin led scientific opposition to gradualism on the basis of his thermodynamic calculations for the age of the Earth at between 24 and 400 million years, and his views favoured a version of theistic evolution accelerated by divine guidance. Geological estimates disputed Kelvin's age of the earth, and the geological approach gained strength in 1907 when radioactive dating of rocks revealed the Earth as billions of years old. The specific hereditary mechanism which Darwin hypothesized, pangenesis, which supported gradualism, also lacked any supporting evidence and was disputed by the empirical tests (1869 onwards) of Francis Galton. Although evolution itself was scientifically unchallenged, uncertainties about the mechanism in the era of "the eclipse of Darwinism" persisted from the 1880s until the 1930s' inclusion of Mendelian inheritance and the rise of the modern evolutionary synthesis. The modern synthesis rose to universal acceptance among biologists with the help of new evidence, such as that from genetics, which confirmed Darwin's predictions and refuted the competing hypotheses.

Protestantism, especially in America, broke out in "acrid polemics" and argument about evolution from 1860 to the 1870s—with the turning point possibly marked by the death of Louis Agassiz in 1873—and by 1880 a form of "Christian evolution" was becoming the consensus. In Britain, while publication of The Descent of Man by Darwin in 1871 reinvigorated debate from the previous decade, Sir Henry Chadwick (1920–2008) notes a steady acceptance of evolution "among more educated Christians" between 1860 and 1885. As a result, evolutionary theory was "both permissible and respectable" by 1876. Frederick Temple's lectures on The Relations between Religion and Science (1884) on how evolution was not "antagonistic" to religion highlighted this trend. Temple's appointment as Archbishop of Canterbury in 1896 demonstrated the broad acceptance of evolution within the church hierarchy.

For decades the Roman Catholic Church avoided officially rejecting evolution. However, the Church would rein in Catholics who proposed that evolution could be reconciled with the Bible, as this conflicted with the First Vatican Council's (1869–70) finding that everything was created out of nothing by God, and to deny that finding could lead to excommunication. In 1950 the encyclical Humani generis of Pope Pius XII first mentioned evolution directly and officially. It allowed one to enquire into the concept of humans coming from pre-existing living matter, but not to question Adam and Eve or the creation of the soul. In 1996 Pope John Paul II labelled evolution "more than a hypothesis" and acknowledged the large body of work accumulated in its support, but reiterated that any attempt to give a material explanation of the human soul is "incompatible with the truth about man". Pope Benedict XVI in 2005 reiterated the conviction that human beings "are not some casual and meaningless product of evolution. Each of us is the result of a thought of God. Each of us is willed, each of us is loved, each of us is necessary." At the same time, Pope Benedict promoted the study of the relationship between the concepts of creation and evolution, based on the conviction that there cannot be a contradiction between faith and reason. Along these lines, the research project "Thomistic Evolution", run by a team of Dominican scholars, endeavours to reconcile the scientific evidence on evolution with the teaching of Thomas Aquinas (1225–1274).

Islamic views on evolution ranged from those believing in literal creation (as implied in the Quran) to many educated Muslims who subscribed to a version of theistic or guided evolution in which the Quran reinforced rather than contradicted mainstream science. This occurred relatively early, as medieval madrasas taught the ideas of Al-Jahiz, a Muslim scholar from the 9th century, who proposed concepts similar to natural selection. However, acceptance of evolution remains low in the Muslim world, as prominent figures reject evolution's underpinning philosophy of materialism as unsound to human origins and a denial of Allah. Further objections by Muslim authors and writers largely reflect those put forward in the Western world.

Regardless of acceptance from major religious hierarchies, early religious objections to Darwin's theory continue in use in opposition to evolution. The idea that species change over time through natural processes and that different species share common ancestors seemed to contradict the Genesis account of Creation. Believers in Biblical infallibility attacked Darwinism as heretical. The natural theology of the early-19th century was typified by William Paley's 1802 version of the watchmaker analogy, an argument from design still deployed by the creationist movement. Natural theology included a range of ideas and arguments from the outset, and when Darwin's theory was published, ideas of theistic evolution were presented in which evolution is accepted as a secondary cause open to scientific investigation, while still holding belief in God as a first cause with a non-specified role in guiding evolution and creating humans. This position has been adopted by denominations of Christianity and Judaism in line with modernist theology which views the Bible and Torah as allegorical, thus removing the conflict between evolution and religion.

However, in the 1920s Christian fundamentalists in the United States developed their literalist arguments against modernist theology into opposition to the teaching of evolution, with fears that Darwinism had led to German militarism and posed a threat to religion and morality. This opposition developed into the creation–evolution controversy, involving Christian literalists in the United States objecting to the teaching of evolution in public schools. Although early objectors dismissed evolution as contradicting their interpretation of the Bible, this argument was legally invalidated when the United States Supreme Court ruled in Epperson v. Arkansas in 1968 that forbidding the teaching of evolution on religious grounds violated the Establishment Clause.

Since then creationists have developed more nuanced objections to evolution, alleging variously that it is unscientific, infringes on creationists' religious freedoms, or that the acceptance of evolution is a religious stance. Creationists have appealed to democratic principles of fairness, arguing that evolution is controversial and that science classrooms should therefore "Teach the Controversy". These objections to evolution culminated in the intelligent-design movement in the 1990s and early 2000s that unsuccessfully attempted to present itself as a scientific alternative to evolution.

== Defining evolution ==
A major source of confusion and ambiguity in any creation–evolution debate arises from the definition of evolution itself. In the context of biology, evolution is genetic changes in populations of organisms over successive generations. The word also has a number of different meanings in different fields, from evolutionary computation to molecular evolution to sociocultural evolution to stellar and galactic evolution.

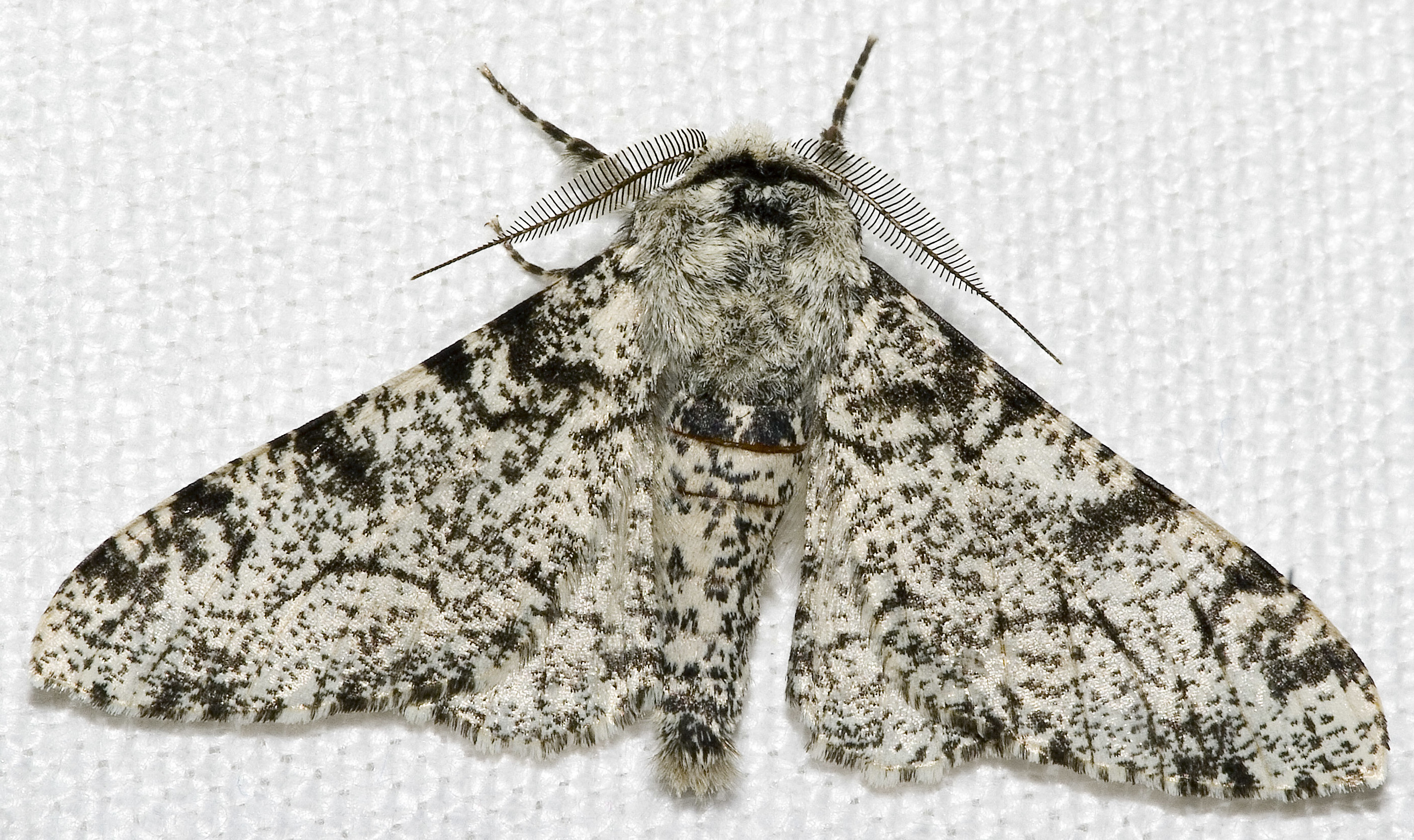
White peppered moth

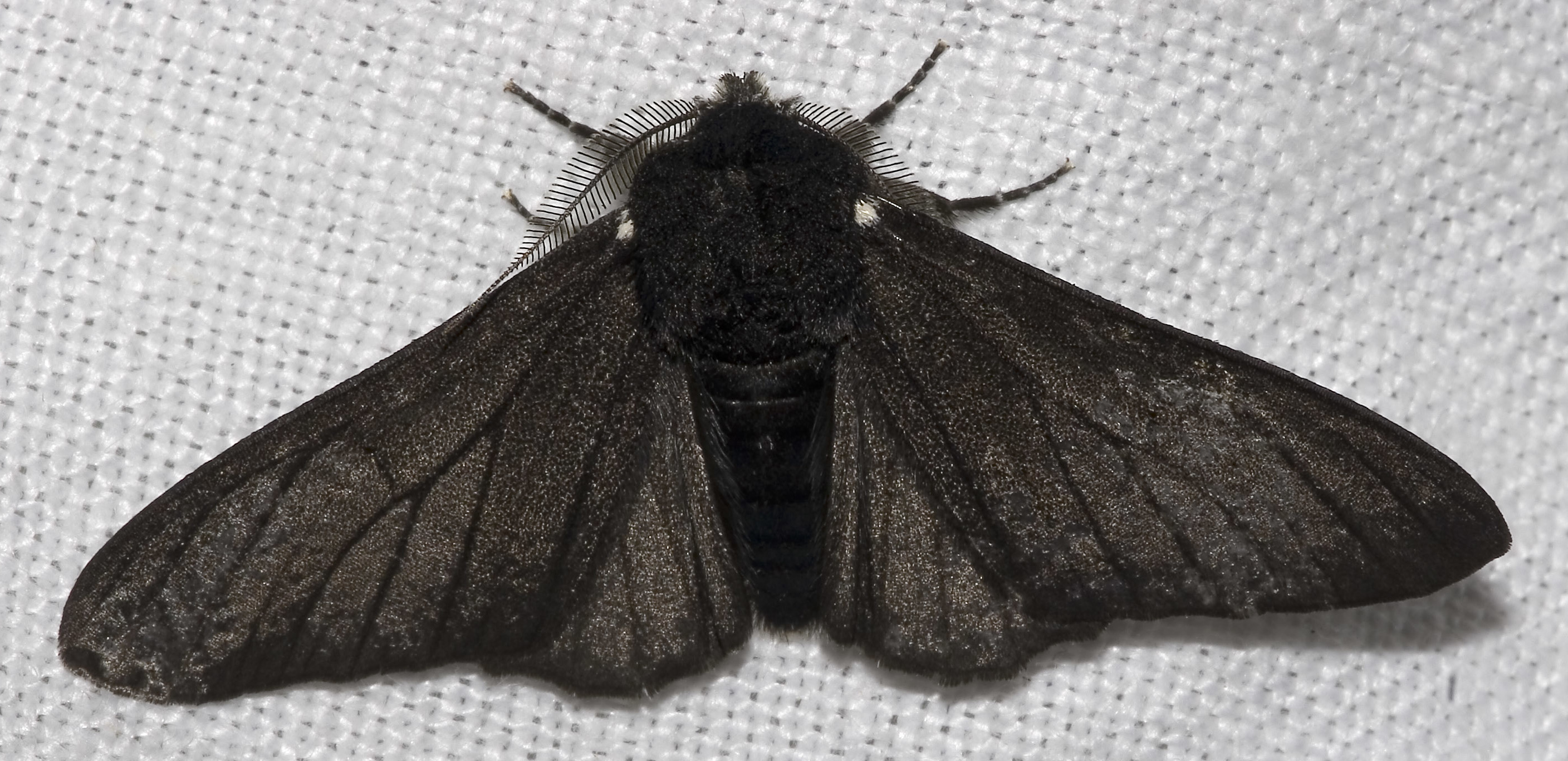
Black morph in peppered moth evolution. Even minor variation in a population can lead to evolution by natural selection.

Evolution in colloquial contexts can refer to any sort of "progressive" development or gradual improvement, and a process that results in greater quality or complexity. When misapplied to biological evolution this common meaning can lead to frequent misunderstandings. For example, the idea of devolution ("backwards" evolution) is a result of erroneously assuming that evolution is directional or has a specific goal in mind (cf. orthogenesis). In reality, the evolution of a biological organism has no "objective" and is only showing increasing ability of successive generations to survive and reproduce in their environment; and increased suitability is only defined in relation to this environment. Biologists do not regard any one species (such as humans) as more highly evolved or advanced than another. Certain sources have been criticized for indicating otherwise due to a tendency to evaluate nonhuman organisms according to anthropocentric standards rather than according to more objective ones.

Evolution also does not require that organisms become more complex. Although the biological development of different forms of life shows an apparent trend towards the evolution of biological complexity, there is a question as to whether this appearance of increased complexity is real, or whether it comes from neglecting the fact that the majority of life on Earth has always consisted of prokaryotes. In this view, complexity is not a necessary consequence of evolution, but specific circumstances of evolution on Earth frequently made greater complexity advantageous and thus naturally selected for. Depending on the situation, organisms' complexity can either increase, decrease, or stay the same, and all three of these trends have been observed in studies of evolution.

Creationist sources frequently define evolution according to a colloquial, rather than the scientific meaning. As a result, many attempts to rebut evolution do not address the findings of evolutionary biology (see straw-man argument). This also means that advocates of creationism and evolutionary biologists often simply speak past each other.

== Scientific acceptance ==
=== Status as a theory ===
Critics of evolution assert that evolution is "just a theory", which emphasizes that scientific theories are never absolute, or misleadingly presents it as a matter of opinion rather than of fact or evidence. This reflects a difference of the meaning of theory in a scientific context: whereas in colloquial speech a theory is a conjecture or guess, in science, a theory is an explanation whose predictions have been verified by experiments or other evidence. Evolutionary theory refers to an explanation for the diversity of species and their ancestry which has met extremely high standards of scientific evidence. An example of evolution as theory is the modern synthesis of Darwinian natural selection and Mendelian inheritance. As with any scientific theory, the modern synthesis is constantly debated, tested, and refined by scientists, but there is an overwhelming consensus in the scientific community that it remains the only robust model that accounts for the known facts concerning evolution.

Critics also state that evolution is not a fact. In science a fact is a verified empirical observation while in colloquial contexts a fact can simply refer to anything for which there is overwhelming evidence. For example, in common usage theories such as "the Earth revolves around the Sun" and "objects fall due to gravity" may be referred to as "facts", even though they are purely theoretical. From a scientific standpoint, therefore, evolution may be called a "fact" for the same reason that gravity can: under the scientific definition, evolution is an observable process that occurs whenever a population of organisms genetically changes over time. Under the colloquial definition, the theory of evolution can also be called a fact, referring to this theory's well-established nature. Thus, evolution is widely considered both a theory and a fact by scientists.

Similar confusion is involved in objections that evolution is "unproven", since no theory in science is known to be absolutely true, only verified by empirical evidence. This distinction is an important one in philosophy of science, as it relates to the lack of absolute certainty in all empirical claims, not just evolution. Strict proof is possible only in formal sciences such as logic and mathematics, not natural sciences (where terms such as "validated" or "corroborated" are more appropriate). Thus, to say that evolution is not proven is trivially true, but no more an indictment of evolution than calling it a "theory". The confusion arises in that the colloquial meaning of proof is simply "compelling evidence", in which case scientists would indeed consider evolution "proven".

=== Degree of acceptance ===
An objection is often made in the teaching of evolution that evolution is controversial or contentious. Unlike past creationist arguments which sought to abolish the teaching of evolution altogether, this argument makes the claim that evolution should be presented alongside alternative views since it is controversial, and students should be allowed to evaluate and choose between the options on their own.

This objection forms the basis of the "Teach the Controversy" campaign by the Discovery Institute, a think tank based in Seattle, Washington, to promote the teaching of intelligent design in U.S. public schools. This goal followed the Institute's "wedge strategy", an attempt to gradually undermine evolution and ultimately to "reverse the stifling dominance of the materialist worldview, and to replace it with a science consonant with Christian and theistic convictions." Several other attempts were made to insert intelligent design or creationism into the U.S. public school curriculum, including the failed Santorum Amendment in 2001.

Scientists and U.S. courts have rejected this objection on the grounds that science is not based on appeals to popularity, but on evidence. The scientific consensus of biologists determines what is considered acceptable science, not popular opinion or fairness, and although evolution is controversial in the public arena, it is entirely uncontroversial among experts in the field.

In response, creationists have disputed the level of scientific support for evolution. The Discovery Institute has gathered over 761 scientists as of August 2008 to sign A Scientific Dissent From Darwinism in order to show that there are a number of scientists who dispute what they refer to as "Darwinian evolution". This statement did not profess outright disbelief in evolution, but expressed skepticism as to the ability of "random mutation and natural selection to account for the complexity of life." Several counter-petitions have been launched in turn, including A Scientific Support for Darwinism, which gathered over 7,000 signatures in four days, and Project Steve, a tongue-in-cheek petition that has gathered the signatures of 1,497 (as of May 22, 2024) evolution-supporting scientists named "Steve" (or any similar variation thereof—Stephen, Stephanie, Esteban, etc.).

Creationists have argued for over a century that evolution is a "theory in crisis" that will soon be overturned, based on objections that it lacks reliable evidence or violates natural laws. These objections have been rejected by most scientists, as have claims that intelligent design, or any other creationist explanation, meets the basic scientific standards that would be required to make them scientific alternatives to evolution. It is also argued that even if evidence against evolution exists, it is a false dilemma to characterize this as evidence for intelligent design.

A similar objection to evolution is that certain scientific authorities—mainly pre-modern ones—have doubted or rejected evolution. Most commonly, it is argued that Darwin "recanted" on his deathbed, a false anecdote originating from Lady Hope's story. These objections are generally rejected as appeals to authority.

== Scientific status ==
A common neo-creationist objection to evolution is that evolution does not adhere to normal scientific standards—that it is not genuinely scientific. It is argued that evolutionary biology does not follow the scientific method and therefore should not be taught in science classes, or at least should be taught alongside other views (i.e., creationism). These objections often deal with:

- the very nature of evolutionary theory,
- the scientific method, and
- the philosophy of science.

=== Religious nature ===
Creationists commonly argue that "evolution is a religion; it is not a science." The purpose of this criticism is to reframe the debate from one between science (evolution) and religion (creationism) to between two religious beliefs—or even to argue that evolution is religious while intelligent design is not. Those that oppose evolution frequently refer to supporters of evolution as "evolutionists" or "Darwinists".

The arguments for evolution being a religion generally amount to arguments by analogy: it is argued that evolution and religion have one or more things in common, and that therefore evolution is a religion. Examples of claims made in such arguments are statements that evolution is based on faith, and that supporters of evolution dogmatically reject alternative suggestions out-of-hand. These claims have become more popular in recent years as the neo-creationist movement has sought to distance itself from religion, thus giving it more reason to make use of a seemingly anti-religious analogy.

Supporters of evolution have argued in response that no scientist's claims are treated as sacrosanct, as shown by the aspects of Darwin's theory that have been rejected or revised by scientists over the years to form first neo-Darwinism and later the modern evolutionary synthesis. The claim that evolution relies on faith is likewise rejected on the grounds that evolution has strong supporting evidence, and therefore does not require faith.

The argument that evolution is religious has been rejected in general on the grounds that religion is not defined by how dogmatic or zealous its adherents are, but by its spiritual or supernatural beliefs. But evolution is neither dogmatic nor based on faith, and they accuse creationists of equivocating between the strict definition of religion and its colloquial usage to refer to anything that is enthusiastically or dogmatically engaged in. United States courts have also rejected this objection:

Assuming for the purposes of argument, however, that evolution is a religion or religious tenet, the remedy is to stop the teaching of evolution, not establish another religion in opposition to it. Yet it is clearly established in the case law, and perhaps also in common sense, that evolution is not a religion and that teaching evolution does not violate the Establishment Clause, Epperson v. Arkansas, supra, Willoughby v. Stever, No. 15574-75 (D.D.C. May 18, 1973); aff'd. 504 F.2d 271 (D.C. Cir. 1974), cert. denied, 420 U.S. 924 (1975); Wright v. Houston Indep. School Dist., 366 F. Supp. 1208 (S.D. Tex 1978), aff.d. 486 F.2d 137 (5th Cir. 1973), cert. denied 417 U.S. 969 (1974).

A related claim is that evolution is atheistic (see the Atheism section below); creationists sometimes merge the two claims and describe evolution as an "atheistic religion" (cf. humanism). This argument against evolution is also frequently generalized into a criticism of all science; it is argued that "science is an atheistic religion", on the grounds that its methodological naturalism is as unproven, and thus as "faith-based", as the supernatural and theistic beliefs of creationism.

=== Unfalsifiability ===
A statement is considered falsifiable if there is an observation or a test that could be made that would demonstrate that the statement is false. Statements that are not falsifiable cannot be examined by scientific investigation since they permit no tests that evaluate their accuracy. Creationists such as Henry M. Morris have claimed that any observation can be fitted into the evolutionary framework, so it is impossible to demonstrate that evolution is wrong and therefore evolution is non-scientific.

Evolution could be falsified by many conceivable lines of evidence, such as:

- the fossil record showing no change over time,
- confirmation that mutations are prevented from accumulating in a population, or
- observations of organisms being created supernaturally or spontaneously.

J. B. S. Haldane, when asked what hypothetical evidence could disprove evolution, replied "fossil rabbits in the Precambrian era." Numerous other potential ways to falsify evolution have also been proposed. For example, the fact that humans have one fewer pair of chromosomes than the great apes offered a testable hypothesis involving the fusion or splitting of chromosomes from a common ancestor. The fusion hypothesis was confirmed in 2005 by discovery that human chromosome 2 is homologous with a fusion of two chromosomes that remain separate in other primates. Extra, inactive telomeres and centromeres remain on human chromosome 2 as a result of the fusion. The assertion of common descent could also have been disproven with the invention of DNA sequencing methods. If true, human DNA should be far more similar to chimpanzees and other great apes, than to other mammals. If not, then common descent is falsified. DNA analysis has shown that humans and chimpanzees share a large percentage of their DNA (between 95% and 99.4% depending on the measure). Also, the evolution of chimpanzees and humans from a common ancestor predicts a (geologically) recent common ancestor. Numerous transitional fossils have since been found. Hence, human evolution has passed several falsifiable tests.

Many of Darwin's ideas and assertions of fact have been falsified as evolutionary science has developed, but these amendments and falsifications have uniformly confirmed his central concepts. In contrast, creationist explanations involving the direct intervention of the supernatural in the physical world are not falsifiable, because any result of an experiment or investigation could be the unpredictable action of an omnipotent deity.

In 1976, the philosopher Karl Popper said that "Darwinism is not a testable scientific theory but a metaphysical research programme." He later changed his mind and argued that Darwin's "theory of natural selection is difficult to test" with respect to other areas of science.

In his 1982 book, Abusing Science: The Case Against Creationism, philosopher of science Philip Kitcher specifically addresses the "falsifiability" question by taking into account notable philosophical critiques of Popper by Carl Gustav Hempel and Willard Van Orman Quine and provides a definition of theory other than as a set of falsifiable statements. As Kitcher points out, if one took a strictly Popperian view of "theory", observations of Uranus when it was first discovered in 1781 would have "falsified" Isaac Newton's celestial mechanics, as there were irregularities in its orbit that did not line up with predictions. Instead of discarding Newtonian mechanics as a viable explanation of the solar system's motion, people suggested that another planet, not yet observed at the time, influenced Uranus' orbit—and this prediction was indeed eventually confirmed. Kitcher agrees with Popper that "there is surely something right in the idea that a science can succeed only if it can fail." But he insists that we view scientific theories as consisting of an "elaborate collection of statements", some of which are not falsifiable, and others—what he calls "auxiliary hypotheses", which are.

=== Tautological nature ===
A related claim to the supposed unfalsifiability of evolution is that natural selection is tautological. Specifically, it is often argued that the phrase "survival of the fittest" is a tautology, in that fitness is defined as ability to survive and reproduce. This phrase was first used by Herbert Spencer in 1864 but is rarely used by biologists. Additionally, fitness is more accurately defined as the state of possessing traits that make survival more likely; this definition, unlike simple "survivability", avoids being trivially true.

Similarly, it is argued that evolutionary theory is circular reasoning, in that evidence is interpreted as supporting evolution, but evolution is required to interpret the evidence. An example of this is the claim that geological strata are dated through the fossils they hold, but that fossils are in turn dated by the strata they are in. However, in most cases strata are not dated by their fossils, but by their position relative to other strata and by radiometric dating, and most strata were dated before the theory of evolution was formulated.

== Evidence ==
Objections to the fact that evolution occurs tend to focus on specific interpretations about the evidence.

=== Lack of observation ===
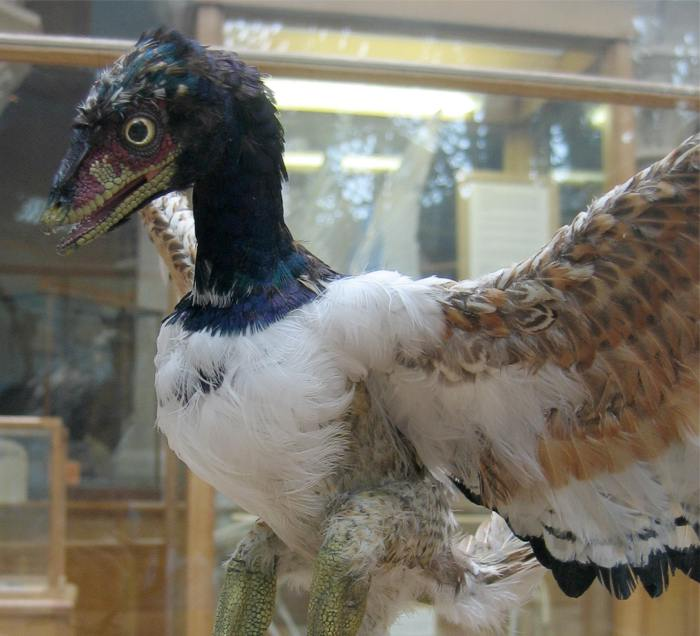
Transitional species such as the Archaeopteryx have been a fixture of the creation–evolution debate for almost 150 years.

A common claim of creationists is that evolution has never been observed. Challenges to such objections often come down to debates over how evolution is defined (see the Defining evolution section above). Under the conventional biological definition of evolution, it is a simple matter to observe evolution occurring. Evolutionary processes, in the form of populations changing their genetic composition from generation to generation, have been observed in different scientific contexts, including the evolution of fruit flies, mice, and bacteria in the laboratory, and of tilapia in the field. Such studies on experimental evolution, particularly those using microorganisms, are now providing important insights into how evolution occurs, especially in the case of antibiotic resistance.

In response to such examples, creationists say there are two major subdivisions of evolution to be considered, microevolution and macroevolution, and it is questionable if macro-evolution has been physically observed to occur. Most creationist organizations do not dispute the occurrence of short-term, relatively minor evolutionary changes, such as that observed even in dog breeding. Rather, they dispute the occurrence of major evolutionary changes over long periods of time, which by definition cannot be directly observed, only inferred from microevolutionary processes and the traces of macroevolutionary ones.

As biologists define macroevolution, both microevolution and macroevolution have been observed. Speciations, for example, have been directly observed many times. Additionally, the modern evolutionary synthesis draws no distinction in the processes described by the theory of evolution when considering macroevolution and microevolution as the former is simply at the species level or above and the latter is below the species level. An example of this is ring species.

Additionally, past macroevolution can be inferred from historical traces. Transitional fossils, for example, provide plausible links between several different groups of organisms, such as Archaeopteryx linking birds and non-avian dinosaurs, or the Tiktaalik linking fish and limbed amphibians. Creationists dispute such examples, from asserting that such fossils are hoaxes or that they belong exclusively to one group or the other, to asserting that there should be far more evidence of obvious transitional species. Darwin himself found the paucity of transitional species to be one of the greatest weaknesses of his theory:

Why then is not every geological formation and every stratum full of such intermediate links? Geology assuredly does not reveal any such finely graduated organic chain and this, perhaps, is the most obvious and gravest objection which can be urged against my theory. The explanation lies, as I believe, in the extreme imperfection of the geological record.

Darwin appealed to the limited collections then available, the extreme lengths of time involved, and different rates of change with some living species differing very little from fossils of the Silurian period. In later editions he added "that the periods during which species have been undergoing modification, though very long as measured by years, have probably been short in comparison with the periods during which these same species remained without undergoing any change." The number of clear transitional fossils has increased enormously since Darwin's day, and this problem has been largely resolved with the advent of the theory of punctuated equilibrium, which predicts a primarily stable fossil record broken up by occasional major speciations.

As more and more compelling direct evidence for inter-species and species-to-species evolution has been gathered, creationists have redefined their understanding of what amounts to "created kinds", and have continued to insist that more dramatic demonstrations of evolution be experimentally produced. One version of this objection is "Were you there?", popularized by young Earth creationist Ken Ham. It argues that because no one except God could directly observe events in the distant past, scientific claims are just speculation or "story-telling". DNA sequences of the genomes of organisms allow an independent test of their predicted relationships, since species which diverged more recently will be more closely related genetically than species which are more distantly related; such phylogenetic trees show a hierarchical organization within the tree of life, as predicted by common descent.

In fields such as astrophysics or meteorology, where direct observation or laboratory experiments are difficult or impossible, the scientific method instead relies on observation and logical inference. In such fields, the test of falsifiability is satisfied when a theory is used to predict the results of new observations. When such observations contradict a theory's predictions, it may be revised or discarded if an alternative better explains the observed facts. For example, Newton's theory of gravitation was replaced by Albert Einstein's theory of general relativity when the latter was observed to more precisely predict the orbit of Mercury.

=== Unreliable evidence ===
A related objection is that evolution is based on unreliable evidence, claiming that evolution is not even well-evidenced. Typically, this is either based on the argument that evolution's evidence is full of frauds and hoaxes, that current evidence for evolution is likely to be overturned as some past evidence has been, or that certain types of evidence are inconsistent and dubious.

Arguments against evolution's reliability are thus often based on analyzing the history of evolutionary thought or the history of science in general. Creationists point out that in the past, major scientific revolutions have overturned theories that were at the time considered near-certain. They thus claim that current evolutionary theory is likely to undergo such a revolution in the future, on the basis that it is a "theory in crisis" for one reason or another.

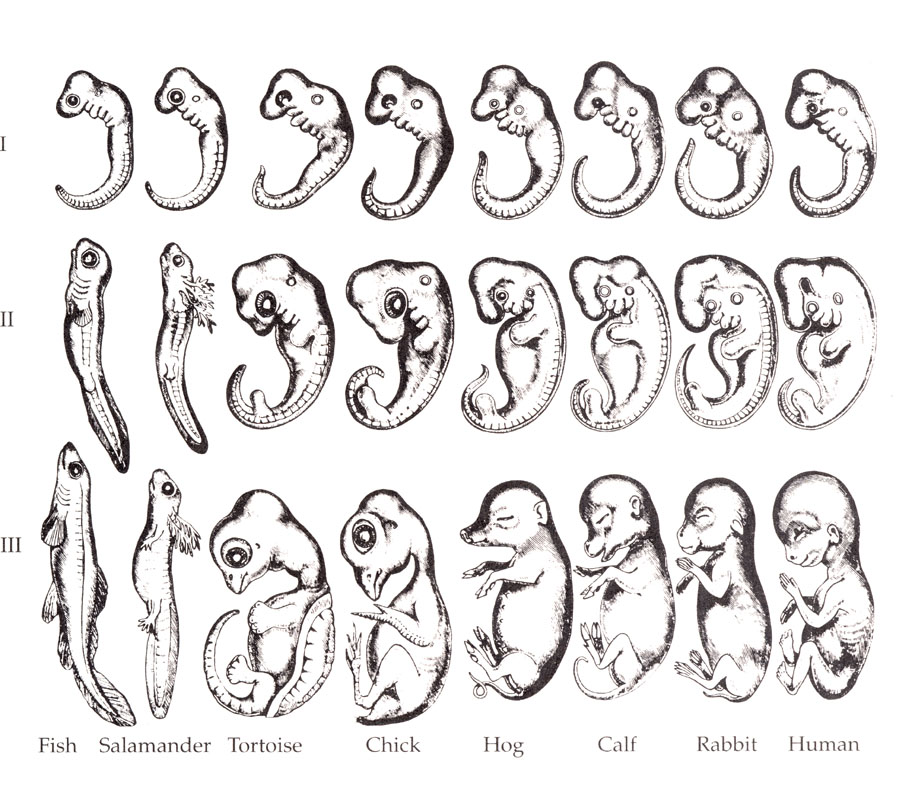
George Romanes' 1892 copy of Ernst Haeckel's embryo drawings, often attributed incorrectly to Haeckel

Critics of evolution commonly appeal to past scientific hoaxes such as the Piltdown Man forgery. It is argued that because scientists have been mistaken and deceived in the past about evidence for various aspects of evolution, the current evidence for evolution is likely to also be based on fraud and error. Much of the evidence for evolution has been accused of being fraudulent at various times, including Archaeopteryx, peppered moth melanism, and Darwin's finches; these claims have been subsequently refuted.

It has also been claimed that certain former pieces of evidence for evolution which are now considered out-of-date and erroneous, such as Ernst Haeckel's 19th-century comparative drawings of embryos, used to illustrate his recapitulation theory ("ontogeny recapitulates phylogeny"), were not merely errors but frauds. Molecular biologist Jonathan Wells criticizes biology textbooks by alleging that they continue to reproduce such evidence after it has been debunked. In response, the National Center for Science Education notes that none of the textbooks reviewed by Wells makes the claimed error, as Haeckel's drawings are shown in a historical context with discussion about why they are wrong, and the accurate modern drawings and photos used in the textbooks are misrepresented by Wells.

=== Unreliable chronology ===
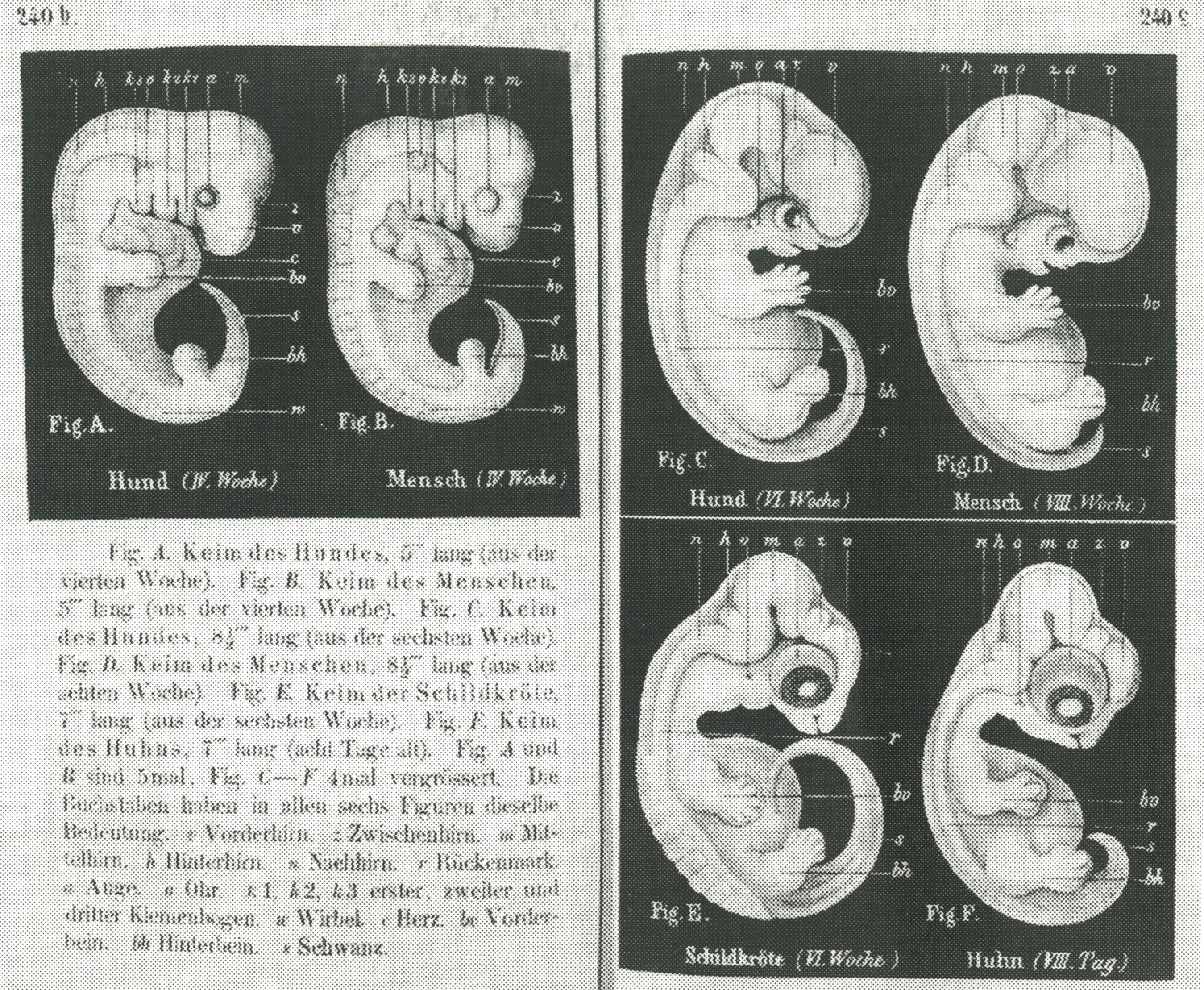
Illustrations of dog and human embryos, looking almost identical at 4 weeks then differing at 6 weeks, shown above a 6-week turtle embryo and 8 day hen embryo, presented by Haeckel in 1868 as convincing proof of evolution. The pictures of the earliest embryonic stages are now considered inaccurate.

Creationists claim that evolution relies on certain types of evidence that do not give reliable information about the past. For example, it is argued that radiometric dating technique of evaluating a material's age based on the radioactive decay rates of certain isotopes generates inconsistent and thus unreliable results. Radiocarbon dating based on the carbon-14 isotope has been particularly criticized. It is argued that radiometric decay relies on a number of unwarranted assumptions such as the principle of uniformitarianism, consistent decay rates, or rocks acting as closed systems. Such arguments have been dismissed by scientists on the grounds that independent methods have confirmed the reliability of radiometric dating as a whole; additionally, different radiometric dating methods and techniques have independently confirmed each other's results.

Another form of this objection is that fossil evidence is not reliable. This is based on a much wider range of claims. These include that there are too many "gaps" in the fossil record, that fossil-dating is circular (see the Unfalsifiability section above), or that certain fossils, such as polystrate fossils, are seemingly "out of place". Examination by geologists have found polystrate fossils to be consistent with in situ formation. It is argued that certain features of evolution support creationism's catastrophism (cf. Great Flood), rather than evolution's gradualistic punctuated equilibrium, which some assert is an ad hoc theory to explain the fossil gaps.

== Plausibility ==
=== Improbability ===
A common objection to evolution is that it is simply too unlikely for life, in its complexity and apparent "design", to have arisen "by chance". It is argued that the odds of life having arisen without a deliberate intelligence guiding it are so incredibly low that it is unreasonable not to infer an intelligent designer from the natural world, and specifically from the diversity of life. A more extreme version of this argument is that evolution cannot create complex structures (see the Creation of complex structures section below). The idea that it is simply too implausible for life to have evolved is often wrongly encapsulated with a quotation that the "probability of life originating on Earth is no greater than the chance that a hurricane, sweeping through a scrapyard, would have the luck to assemble a Boeing 747"—a claim attributed to astrophysicist Fred Hoyle and known as Hoyle's fallacy. Hoyle was a Darwinist, atheist and anti-theist, but advocated the theory of panspermia, in which abiogenesis begins in outer space and primitive life on Earth is held to have arrived via natural dispersion.

Views superficially similar, but unrelated to Hoyle's, are thus invariably justified with arguments from analogy. The basic idea of this argument for a designer is the teleological argument, an argument for the existence of God based on the perceived order or purposefulness of the universe. A common way of using this as an objection to evolution is by appealing to the 18th-century philosopher William Paley's watchmaker analogy, which argues that certain natural phenomena are analogical to a watch (in that they are ordered, or complex, or purposeful), which means that, like a watch, they must have been designed by a "watchmaker"—an intelligent agent. This argument forms the core of intelligent design, a neo-creationist movement seeking to establish certain variants of the design argument as legitimate science, rather than as philosophy or theology, and have them be taught alongside evolution.

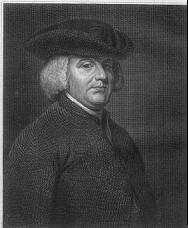
Because the theory of evolution is often thought of as the idea that life arose "by chance", design arguments such as William Paley's watchmaker analogy of 1802 have long been popular objections to the theory: Paley's book included a response to the proto-evolutionary ideas of Erasmus Darwin.

Supporters of evolution generally respond by arguing that this objection is simply an argument by lack of imagination, or argument from incredulity: a certain explanation is seen as being counterintuitive, and therefore an alternate, more intuitive explanation is appealed to instead. In actuality, evolution is not based on "chance", but on predictable chemical interactions: natural processes, rather than supernatural beings, are the "designer". Although the process involves some random elements, it is the non-random selection of survival-enhancing genes that drives the evolution of complex and ordered patterns. The fact that the results are ordered and seem "designed" is no more evidence for a supernatural intelligence than the appearance of complex non-living phenomena (e.g. snowflakes). It is also argued that there is insufficient evidence to make statements about the plausibility or implausibility of abiogenesis, that certain structures demonstrate poor design, and that the implausibility of life evolving exactly as it did is no more evidence for an intelligence than the implausibility of a deck of cards being shuffled and dealt in a certain random order.

It has also been noted that arguments against some form of life arising "by chance" are really objections to nontheistic abiogenesis, not to evolution. Indeed, arguments against "evolution" are based on the misconception that abiogenesis is a component of, or necessary precursor to, evolution. Similar objections sometimes conflate the Big Bang with evolution.

Christian apologist and philosopher Alvin Plantinga, who believes evolution must have been guided if it occurred, has formalized and revised the improbability argument as the evolutionary argument against naturalism, which asserts that it is irrational to reject a supernatural, intelligent creator because the apparent probability of certain faculties evolving is so low. Specifically, Plantinga claims that evolution cannot account for the rise of reliable reasoning faculties. Plantinga argues that whereas a God would be expected to create beings with reliable reasoning faculties, evolution would be just as likely to lead to unreliable ones, meaning that if evolution is true, it is irrational to trust whatever reasoning one relies on to conclude that it is true. This novel epistemological argument has been criticized similarly to other probabilistic design arguments. It has also been argued that rationality, if conducive to survival, is more likely to be selected for than irrationality, making the natural development of reliable cognitive faculties more likely than unreliable ones.

A related argument against evolution is that most mutations are harmful. However, the vast majority of mutations are neutral, and the minority of mutations which are beneficial or harmful are often situational; a mutation that is harmful in one environment may be helpful in another.

=== Unexplained aspects of the natural world ===
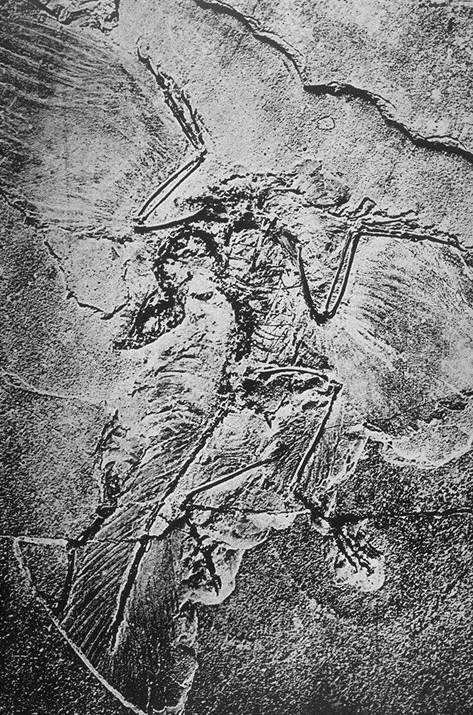
1880 photo of the Berlin Archaeopteryx specimen, showing leg feathers that were removed subsequently, during preparation.

In addition to complex structures and systems, among the phenomena that critics variously claim evolution cannot explain are consciousness, hominid intelligence, instincts, emotions, metamorphosis, photosynthesis, homosexuality, music, language, religion, morality, and altruism (see altruism in animals). Most of these, such as hominid intelligence, instinct, emotion, photosynthesis, language, and altruism, have been well-explained by evolution, while others remain mysterious, or only have preliminary explanations. No alternative explanation has been able to adequately explain the biological origin of these phenomena either.

Creationists argue against evolution on the grounds that it cannot explain certain non-evolutionary processes, such as abiogenesis, the Big Bang, or the meaning of life. In such instances, evolution is being redefined to refer to the entire history of the universe, and it is argued that if one aspect of the universe is seemingly inexplicable, the entire body of scientific theories must be baseless. At this point, objections leave the arena of evolutionary biology and become general scientific or philosophical disputes.

Astronomers Fred Hoyle and Chandra Wickramasinghe have argued in favor of cosmic ancestry, and against abiogenesis and evolution.

== Impossibility ==
This class of objections is more radical than the above, claiming that a major aspect of evolution is not merely unscientific or implausible, but rather impossible, because it contradicts some other law of nature or is constrained in such a way that it cannot produce the biological diversity of the world.

=== Creation of complex structures ===
The bacterial flagellum has been invoked in creation science and in intelligent design to illustrate the concept of irreducible complexity. Careful analysis shows that there are no major obstacles to a gradual evolution of flagella.

Living things have fantastically intricate features—at the anatomical, cellular and molecular level— that could not function if they were any less complex or sophisticated. The only prudent conclusion is that they are the products of intelligent design, not evolution.

— Jonathan Sarfati, quoting Scientific American editor John Rennie

Modern evolutionary theory posits that all biological systems must have evolved incrementally, through a combination of natural selection and genetic drift. Both Darwin and his early detractors recognized the potential problems that could arise for his theory of natural selection if the lineage of organs and other biological features could not be accounted for by gradual, step-by-step changes over successive generations; if all the intermediary stages between an initial organ and the organ it will become are not all improvements upon the original, it will be impossible for the later organ to develop by the process of natural selection alone. Complex organs such as the eye had been presented by William Paley as exemplifying the need for design by God, and anticipating early criticisms that the evolution of the eye and other complex organs seemed impossible, Darwin noted that:

[R]eason tells me, that if numerous gradations from a perfect and complex eye to one very imperfect and simple, each grade being useful to its possessor, can be shown to exist; if further, the eye does vary ever so slightly, and the variations be inherited, which is certainly the case; and if any variation or modification in the organ be ever useful to an animal under changing conditions of life, then the difficulty of believing that a perfect and complex eye could be formed by natural selection, though insuperable by our imagination, can hardly be considered real.

Similarly, ethologist and evolutionary biologist Richard Dawkins said on the topic of the evolution of the feather in an interview for the television program The Atheism Tapes:

There's got to be a series of advantages all the way in the feather. If you can't think of one, then that's your problem not natural selection's problem... It's perfectly possible feathers began as fluffy extensions of reptilian scales to act as insulators... The earliest feathers might have been a different approach to hairiness among reptiles keeping warm.

Creationist arguments have been made such as "What use is half an eye?" and "What use is half a wing?". Research has confirmed that the natural evolution of the eye and other intricate organs is entirely feasible. Creationist claims have persisted that such complexity evolving without a designer is inconceivable and this objection to evolution has been refined in recent years as the more sophisticated irreducible complexity argument of the intelligent design movement, formulated by Michael Behe. Biochemist Michael Behe has argued that current evolutionary theory cannot account for certain complex structures, particularly in microbiology. On this basis, Behe argues that such structures were "purposely arranged by an intelligent agent".

Irreducible complexity is the idea that certain biological systems cannot be broken down into their constituent parts and remain functional, and therefore that they could not have evolved naturally from less complex or complete systems. Whereas past arguments of this nature generally relied on macroscopic organs, Behe's primary examples of irreducible complexity have been cellular and biochemical in nature. He has argued that the components of systems such as the blood clotting cascade, the immune system, and the bacterial flagellum are so complex and interdependent that they could not have evolved from simpler systems.

In the years since Behe proposed irreducible complexity, new developments and advances in biology such as an improved understanding of the evolution of flagella, have already undermined these arguments. The idea that seemingly irreducibly complex systems cannot evolve has been refuted through evolutionary mechanisms, such as exaptation (the adaptation of organs for entirely new functions) and the use of "scaffolding", which are initially necessary features of a system that later degenerate when they are no longer required. Potential evolutionary pathways have been provided for all of the systems Behe used as examples of irreducible complexity.

==== Cambrian explosion complexity argument ====
The Cambrian explosion was the relatively rapid appearance around 539 million years ago of most major animal phyla as demonstrated in the fossil record, and many more phyla now extinct. (Note: Counts vary, but typical is that 35 of the 40 extant phyla originated then, and up to 100 additional phyla that are now extinct.) This was accompanied by major diversification of other organisms. (Note: This included at least animals, phytoplankton and calcimicrobes.) Prior to the Cambrian explosion most organisms were simple, composed of individual cells occasionally organized into colonies. Over the following 70 or 80 million years the rate of diversification accelerated by an order of magnitude (Note: As defined in terms of the extinction and origination rate of species.) and the diversity of life began to resemble that of today, although they did not resemble the species of today.

The basic problem with this is that natural selection calls for the slow accumulation of changes, where a new phylum would take longer than a new class which would take longer than a new order, which would take longer than a new family, which would take longer than a new genus would take longer than emergence of a new species but the apparent occurrence of high-level taxa without precedents is perhaps implying unusual evolutionary mechanisms.

There is general consensus that many factors helped trigger the rise of new phyla, but there is no generally accepted consensus about the combination and the Cambrian explosion continues to be an area of controversy and research over why so rapid, why at the phylum level, why so many phyla then and none since, and even if the apparent fossil record is accurate. Some recent advances suggest that there is no clearly definable "Cambrian Explosion" event in the fossil record, but rather that there was a progression of transitional radiations starting with the Ediacaran period and continuing at a similar rate into the Cambrian.

An example of opinions involving the commonly cited rise in oxygen Great Oxidation Event from biologist PZ Myers summarizes: "What it was was environmental changes, in particular the bioturbation revolution caused by the evolution of worms that released buried nutrients, and the steadily increasing oxygen content of the atmosphere that allowed those nutrients to fuel growth; ecological competition, or a kind of arms race, that gave a distinct selective advantage to novelties that allowed species to occupy new niches; and the evolution of developmental mechanisms that enabled multicellular organisms to generate new morphotypes readily." The increase in molecular oxygen (O_{2}) also may have allowed the formation of the protective ozone layer (O_{3}) that helps shield Earth from lethal UV radiation from the Sun.

=== Creation of information ===
A recent objection of creationists to evolution is that evolutionary mechanisms such as mutation cannot generate new information. Creationists such as William A. Dembski, Werner Gitt, and Lee Spetner have attempted to use information theory to dispute evolution. Dembski has argued that life demonstrates specified complexity, and proposed a law of conservation of information that extremely improbable "complex specified information" could be conveyed by natural means but never originated without an intelligent agent. Gitt asserted that information is an intrinsic characteristic of life and that an analysis demonstrates the mind and will of their Creator.

These claims have been widely rejected by the scientific community, which states that new information is regularly generated in evolution whenever a novel mutation or gene duplication arises. Dramatic examples of entirely new and unique traits arising through mutation have been observed in recent years, such as the evolution of nylon-eating bacteria which developed new enzymes to efficiently digest a material that never existed before the modern era. There is no need to account for the creation of information when an organism is considered together with the environment it evolved in. The information in the genome forms a record of how it was possible to survive in a particular environment. The information is gathered from the environment through trial and error, as mutating organisms either reproduce or fail.

The concept of specified complexity is widely regarded as mathematically unsound and has not been the basis for further independent work in information theory, in the theory of complex systems, or in biology.

=== Violation of the second law of thermodynamics ===
Since Earth receives energy from the Sun, it is an open system. See dissipative system.

Another objection is that evolution violates the second law of thermodynamics. The law states that "the entropy of an isolated system not in equilibrium will tend to increase over time, approaching a maximum value at equilibrium". In other words, an isolated system's entropy (a measure of the dispersal of energy in a physical system so that it is not available to do mechanical work) will tend to increase or stay the same, not decrease. Creationists argue that evolution violates this physical law by requiring an increase in order (i.e., a decrease in entropy).

The claims have been criticized for ignoring that the second law only applies to isolated systems. Organisms are open systems as they constantly exchange energy and matter with their environment: for example animals eat food and excrete waste, and radiate and absorb heat. It is argued that the Sun-Earth-space system does not violate the second law because the enormous increase in entropy due to the Sun and Earth radiating into space dwarfs the local decrease in entropy caused by the existence and evolution of self-organizing life.

Since the second law of thermodynamics has a precise mathematical definition, this argument can be analyzed quantitatively. This was done by physicist Daniel F. Styer, who concluded: "Quantitative estimates of the entropy involved in biological evolution demonstrate that there is no conflict between evolution and the second law of thermodynamics."

In a published letter to the editor of The Mathematical Intelligencer titled "How anti-evolutionists abuse mathematics", mathematician Jason Rosenhouse stated:

The fact is that natural forces routinely lead to local decreases in entropy. Water freezes into ice and fertilised eggs turn into babies. Plants use sunlight to convert carbon dioxide and water into sugar and oxygen, but [we do] not invoke divine intervention to explain the process ... thermodynamics offers nothing to dampen our confidence in Darwinism.

== Moral implications ==
Other common objections to evolution allege that evolution leads to objectionable results, such as eugenics and Nazi racial theory. It is argued that the teaching of evolution degrades values, undermines morals, and fosters irreligion or atheism. These may be considered appeals to consequences (a form of logical fallacy), as the potential ramifications of belief in evolutionary theory have nothing to do with its truth.

=== Humans as animals ===
In biological classification, humans are animals, a basic point which has been known for more than 2,000 years. Aristotle already described man as a political animal and Porphyry defined man as a rational animal, a definition accepted by the Scholastic philosophers in the Middle Ages. The creationist J. Rendle-Short asserted in Creation magazine that if people are taught evolution they can be expected to behave like animals. In evolutionary terms, humans are able to acquire knowledge and change their behaviour to meet social standards, so humans behave in the manner of other humans.

=== Social effects ===
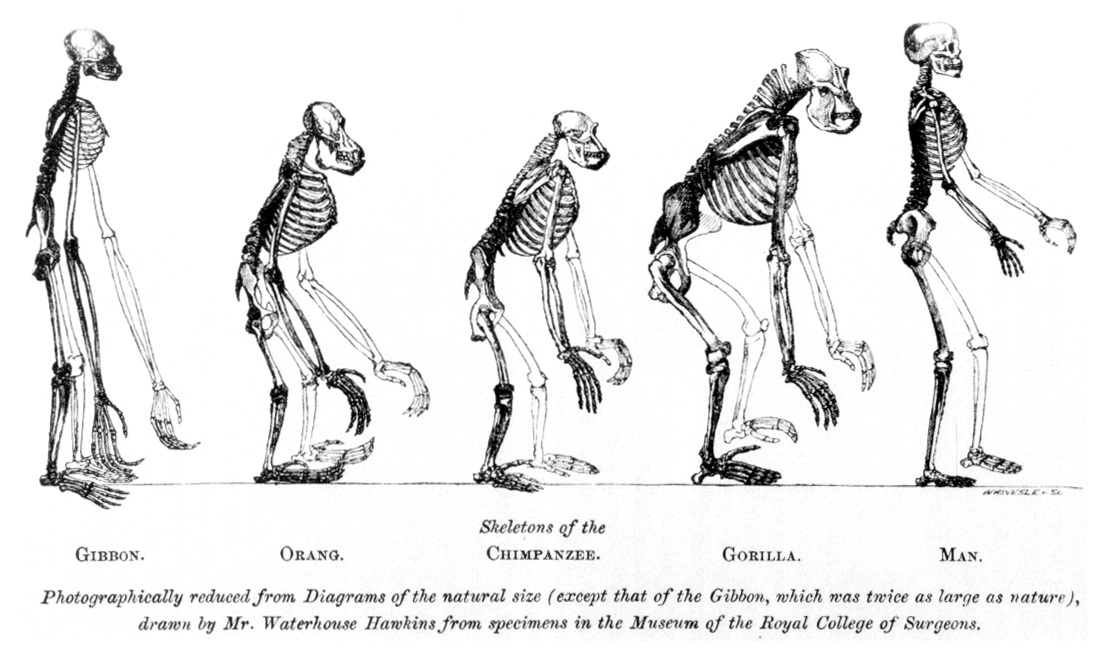
Thomas Henry Huxley's book Man's Place in Nature (1863) was the first devoted to human evolution and an early example of comparative biology.

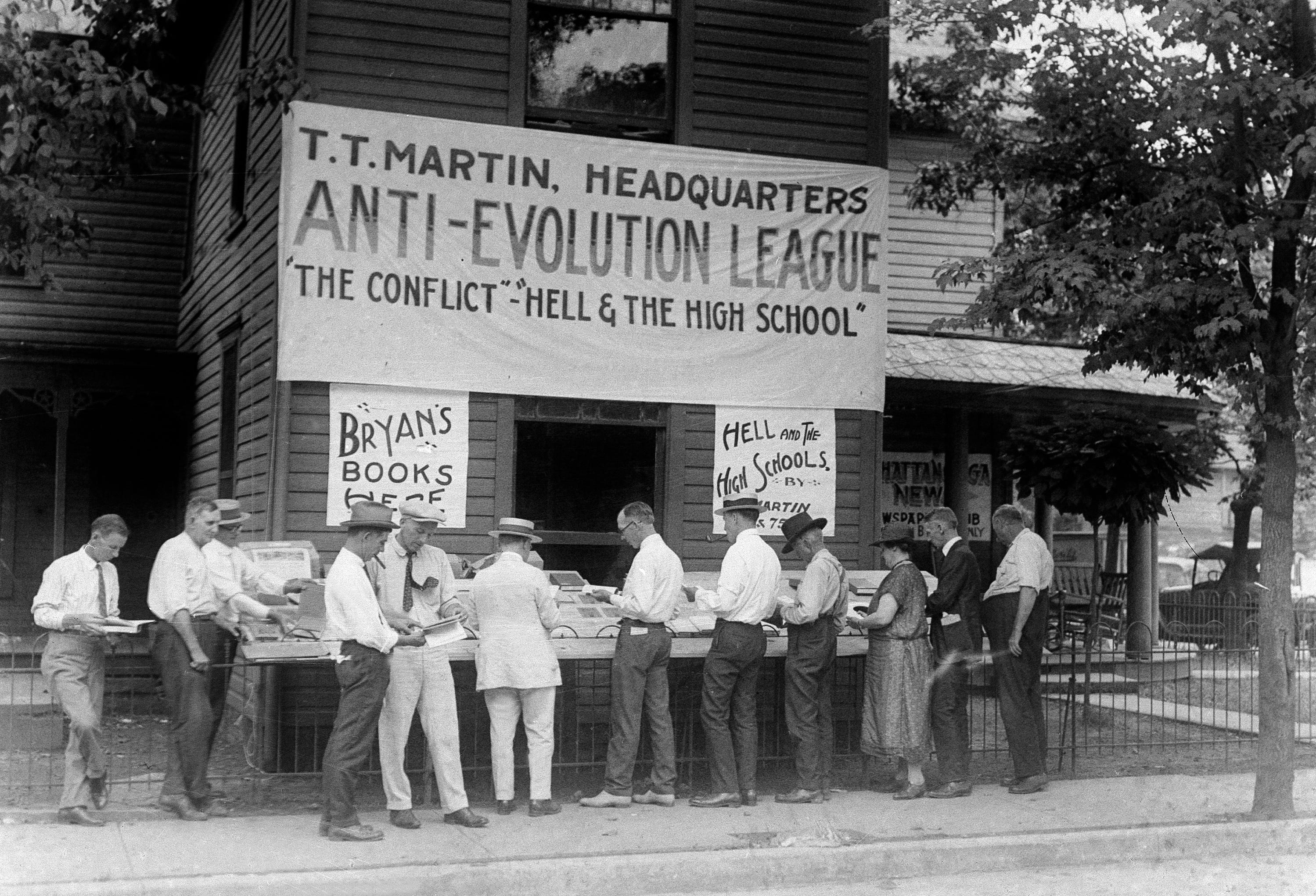
Anti-Evolution League, at the Scopes Trial, Dayton, Tennessee, July 25, 1925

In 1917, Vernon Kellogg published Headquarters Nights: A Record of Conversations and Experiences at the Headquarters of the German Army in France and Belgium, which asserted that German intellectuals were totally committed to might-makes-right due to "whole-hearted acceptance of the worst of Neo-Darwinism, the Allmacht of natural selection applied rigorously to human life and society and Kultur." This strongly influenced the politician William Jennings Bryan, who saw Darwinism as a moral threat to America and campaigned against evolutionary theory; his campaign culminated in the Scopes Trial, which effectively prevented teaching of evolution in most public schools until the 1960s.

R. Albert Mohler, Jr., president of the Southern Baptist Theological Seminary in Louisville, Kentucky, wrote August 8, 2005, in NPR's Taking Issue essay series, that "Debates over education, abortion, environmentalism, homosexuality and a host of other issues are really debates about the origin — and thus the meaning — of human life. ...evolutionary theory stands at the base of moral relativism and the rejection of traditional morality."

1871 caricature of Charles Darwin as an ape

Henry M. Morris, engineering professor and founder of the Creation Research Society and the Institute of Creation Research, claims that evolution was part of a pagan religion that emerged after the Tower of Babel, was part of Plato's and Aristotle's philosophies, and was responsible for everything from war to pornography to the breakup of the nuclear family. He has also claimed that perceived social ills like crime, teenage pregnancies, homosexuality, abortion, immorality, wars, and genocide are caused by a belief in evolution.

Pastor D. James Kennedy of The Center for Reclaiming America for Christ and Coral Ridge Ministries claims that Darwin was responsible for Adolf Hitler's atrocities. In Kennedy's documentary and the accompanying pamphlet with the same title, Darwin's Deadly Legacy, Kennedy states that "To put it simply, no Darwin, no Hitler." In his efforts to expose the "harmful effects that evolution is still having on our nation, our children, and our world," Kennedy also states that, "We have had 150 years of the theory of Darwinian evolution, and what has it brought us? Whether Darwin intended it or not, millions of deaths, the destruction of those deemed inferior, the devaluing of human life, increasing hopelessness." The Discovery Institute's Center for Science and Culture fellow Richard Weikart has made similar claims, as have other creationists. The claim was central to the documentary film Expelled: No Intelligence Allowed (2008) promoting intelligent design creationism. The Anti-Defamation League describes such claims as outrageous misuse of the Holocaust and its imagery, and as trivializing the "...many complex factors that led to the mass extermination of European Jewry. Hitler did not need Darwin or evolution to devise his heinous plan to exterminate the Jewish people, and Darwin and evolutionary theory cannot explain Hitler's genocidal madness. Moreover, anti-Semitism existed long before Darwin ever wrote a word."

Young Earth creationist Kent Hovind blames a long list of social ills on evolution, including communism, socialism, World War I, World War II, racism, the Holocaust, Stalin's war crimes, the Vietnam War, Pol Pot's Killing Fields, the increase in crime and unwed mothers. Hovind's son Eric Hovind claims that evolution is responsible for tattoos, body piercing, premarital sex, unwed births, sexually transmitted diseases (STDs), divorce, and child abuse.

Such accusations are counterfactual, and there is evidence that the opposite seems to be the case. A study published by the author and illustrator Gregory S. Paul found that religious beliefs, including belief in creationism and disbelief in evolution, are positively correlated with social ills like crime. The Barna Group surveys find that Christians and non-Christians in the U.S. have similar divorce rates, and the highest divorce rates in the U.S. are among Baptists and Pentecostals, both sects which reject evolution and embrace creationism.

Michael Shermer argued in Scientific American in October 2006 that evolution supports concepts like family values, avoiding lies, fidelity, moral codes and the rule of law. He goes on to suggest that evolution gives more support to the notion of an omnipotent creator, rather than a tinkerer with limitations based on a human model, the more common image subscribed to by creationists. Careful analysis of the creationist charges that evolution has led to moral relativism and the Holocaust yields the conclusion that these charges appear to be highly suspect. Such analyses conclude that the origins of the Holocaust are more likely to be found in historical Christian antisemitism than in evolution.

Evolution has been used to justify Social Darwinism, the exploitation of so-called "lesser breeds without the law" by "superior races", particularly in the nineteenth century. Typically strong European nations that had successfully expanded their empires could be said to have "survived" in the struggle for dominance. With this attitude, Europeans except for Christian missionaries rarely adopted any customs and languages of local people under their empires. Creationists have frequently maintained that Social Darwinism—leading to policies designed to reward the most competitive—is a logical consequence of "Darwinism" (the theory of natural selection in biology). Biologists and historians have stated that this is a fallacy of appeal to nature, since the theory of natural selection is merely intended as a description of a biological phenomenon and should not be taken to imply that this phenomenon is good or that it ought to be used as a moral guide in human society.

=== Atheism ===
Another charge leveled at evolutionary theory by creationists is that belief in evolution is either tantamount to atheism, or conducive to atheism. It is commonly claimed that all proponents of evolutionary theory are "materialistic atheists". On the other hand, Davis A. Young argues that creation science itself is harmful to Christianity because its bad science will turn more away than it recruits. Young asks, "Can we seriously expect non-Christians to develop a respect for Christianity if we insist on teaching the brand of science that creationism brings with it?" However, evolution neither requires nor rules out the existence of a supernatural being. Philosopher Robert T. Pennock makes the comparison that evolution is no more atheistic than plumbing. H. Allen Orr, professor of biology at University of Rochester, notes that:

Of the five founding fathers of twentieth-century evolutionary biology—Ronald Fisher, Sewall Wright, J. B. S. Haldane, Ernst Mayr, and Theodosius Dobzhansky—one was a devout Anglican who preached sermons and published articles in church magazines, one a practicing Unitarian, one a dabbler in Eastern mysticism, one an apparent atheist, and one a member of the Russian Orthodox Church and the author of a book on religion and science.

In addition, a wide range of religions have reconciled a belief in a supernatural being with evolution. Molleen Matsumura of the National Center for Science Education found that "of Americans in the twelve largest Christian denominations, 89.6% belong to churches that support evolution education." These churches include the "United Methodist Church, National Baptist Convention USA, Evangelical Lutheran Church in America, Presbyterian Church (USA), National Baptist Convention of America, African Methodist Episcopal Church, the Roman Catholic Church, the Episcopal Church, and others." A poll in 2000 done for People for the American Way found that 70% of the American public felt that evolution was compatible with a belief in God. Only 48% of the people polled could choose the correct definition of evolution from a list, however.

One poll reported in the journal Nature showed that among American scientists (across various disciplines), about 40 percent believe in both evolution and an active deity (theistic evolution). This is similar to the results reported for surveys of the general American public. Also, about 40 percent of the scientists polled believe in a God that answers prayers, and believe in immortality. While about 55% of scientists surveyed were atheists, agnostics, or nonreligious theists, atheism is far from universal among scientists who support evolution, or among the general public that supports evolution. Very similar results were reported from a 1997 Gallup Poll of the American public and scientists.

American beliefs regarding evolution
	Young Earth creationism	God-guided evolution	Evolution without God guiding the process
American public	44%	39%	10%
American scientists (Note: Includes persons with professional degrees in fields unrelated to evolution, such as computer science, chemical engineering, physics, psychology, business administration, etc.)	5%	40%	55%

Traditionalists still object to the idea that diversity in life, including human beings, arose through natural processes without a need for supernatural intervention, and they argue against evolution on the basis that it contradicts their literal interpretation of creation myths about separate "created kinds". However, many religions, such as Catholicism which does not endorse nor deny evolution, have allowed Catholics to reconcile their own personal belief with evolution through the idea of theistic evolution.

== See also ==
- Alternatives to Darwinian evolution
- Rejection of evolution by religious groups

== Bibliography ==
- Behe, Michael J. (1996). Darwin's Black Box: The Biochemical Challenge to Evolution. New York: Free Press. ISBN 978-0-684-82754-4. LCCN 96000695. OCLC 34150540.
- Bowler, Peter J. (1992) [Original hardback edition published 1983]. The Eclipse of Darwinism: Anti-Darwinian Evolution Theories in the Decades Around 1900 (Johns Hopkins Paperbacks ed.). Baltimore, MD: Johns Hopkins University Press. ISBN 978-0-8018-4391-4. LCCN 82021170. OCLC 611262030.
- Bowler, Peter J. (2003). Evolution: The History of an Idea (3rd ed.). Berkeley, CA: University of California Press. ISBN 978-0-520-23693-6. LCCN 2002007569. OCLC 49824702.
- Butterfield, Nicholas J. (2001). "Ecology and evolution of Cambrian plankton". In Zhuravlev, Andrey Yu.; Riding, Robert (eds.). The Ecology of the Cambrian Radiation. Critical Moments in Paleobiology and Earth History Series; Perspectives in Paleobiology and Earth History Series. New York: Columbia University Press. ISBN 978-0-231-10613-9. LCCN 00063901. OCLC 44869047.
- Darwin, Charles (1859). On the Origin of Species by Means of Natural Selection, or the Preservation of Favoured Races in the Struggle for Life (1st ed.). London: John Murray. LCCN 06017473. OCLC 741260650. The book is available from The Complete Work of Charles Darwin Online. Retrieved 2015-03-30.
- Darwin, Charles (1866). On the Origin of Species by Means of Natural Selection, or the Preservation of Favoured Races in the Struggle for Life (4th ed.). London: John Murray. OCLC 44636697.
- Dawkins, Richard (2006). The God Delusion. Boston, MA: Houghton Mifflin Company. ISBN 978-0-618-68000-9. LCCN 2006015506. OCLC 68965666.
- Dawkins, Richard (2010) [First published in Great Britain in 2009 by Bantam Press]. The Greatest Show on Earth: The Evidence for Evolution (First Free Press trade pbk. ed.). New York: Free Press. ISBN 978-1-4165-9479-6. LCCN 2010655116. OCLC 685121521.
- Dembski, William A. (1998). The Design Inference: Eliminating Chance through Small Probabilities. Cambridge; New York: Cambridge University Press. ISBN 978-0-521-62387-2. LCCN 98003020. OCLC 38551103.
- Fowler, Thomas (2007). The Evolution Controversy: A Survey of Competing Theories. Grand Rapids, MI: Baker Academic. ISBN 978-0-8010-3174-8. LCCN 2007011459. OCLC 122291332.
- Fry, Iris (2000). Emergence of Life on Earth: A Historical and Scientific Overview. New Brunswick, NJ: Rutgers University Press. ISBN 978-0-8135-2740-6. LCCN 99023153. OCLC 41090659.
- Gould, Stephen J. (1983). Hen's Teeth and Horse's Toes (1st ed.). New York: W. W. Norton & Company. ISBN 978-0-393-01716-8. LCCN 82022259. OCLC 8954357.
- Ham, Ken (1987). The Lie: Evolution. Green Forest, AR: Master Books. ISBN 978-0-89051-158-9. LCCN 00108776. OCLC 50574665.
- Hempel, Carl Gustav (1965) [Essay originally published 1950 in Revue Internationale de Philosophie, 41 (11): 41–63]. "Problems and Changes in the Empiricist Criterion of Meaning" (PDF). Aspects of Scientific Explanation and other Essays in the Philosophy of Science. Glencoe, IL: Free Press. LCCN 65015441. OCLC 522395.
- Hoyle, Fred (1982). Evolution From Space (The Omni Lecture) and Other Papers on the Origin of Life. Hillside, NJ: Enslow Publishers. ISBN 978-0-89490-083-9. LCCN 82008856. OCLC 8495145.
- Hoyle, Fred; Wickramasinghe, Chandra (1982) [Originally published 1981; London: J. M. Dent & Sons]. Evolution from Space: A Theory of Cosmic Creationism (Reprint ed.). New York: Simon & Schuster. ISBN 978-0-671-45031-1. LCCN 82005622. OCLC 8430789.
- Hoyle, Fred; Wickramasinghe, Chandra (1986). Archaeopteryx, the Primordial Bird: A Case of Fossil Forgery. Swansea, Wales: Christopher Davies. ISBN 978-0-7154-0665-6. OCLC 17768215.
- Hoyle, Fred; Wickramasinghe, Chandra (1993). Our Place in the Cosmos: The Unfinished Revolution. London: J. M. Dent & Sons. ISBN 978-0-460-86084-0. LCCN 94130735. OCLC 30817228.
- Isaak, Mark (2007). The Counter-Creationism Handbook. Berkeley, CA: University of California Press. ISBN 978-0-520-24926-4. LCCN 2006047492. OCLC 69241583.
- Kehoe, Alice B. (1984) [Originally published 1983]. "The Word of God". In Godfrey, Laurie R. (ed.). Scientists Confront Creationism (Later prt. ed.). New York: W. W. Norton & Company. ISBN 978-0-393-30154-0. LCCN 82012500. OCLC 12399341.
- Kellogg, Vernon (1917). Headquarters Nights: A Record of Conversations and Experiences at the Headquarters of the German Army in France and Belgium. Boston: The Atlantic Monthly Press. LCCN 17025619. OCLC 1171749. The book is available from the Internet Archive. Retrieved 2015-04-07.
- Kitcher, Philip (1982). Abusing Science: The Case Against Creationism. Cambridge, MA: MIT Press. ISBN 978-0-262-11085-3. LCCN 82009912. OCLC 8477616.
- Klyce, Brig; Wickramasinghe, Chandra (2003). "Creationism versus Darwinism: A Third Alternative". In Campbell, John Angus; Meyer, Stephen C. (eds.). Darwinism, Design and Public Education. East Lansing, MI: Michigan State University Press. ISBN 978-0-87013-675-7. LCCN 2003020507. OCLC 53145654.
- Moore, James R. (1979). The Post-Darwinian Controversies: A Study of the Protestant Struggle to Come to Terms with Darwin in Great Britain and America, 1870–1900. Cambridge; New York: Cambridge University Press. ISBN 978-0-521-21989-1. LCCN 77094372. OCLC 4037223.
- Morris, Henry M., ed. (1974). Scientific Creationism. Prepared by the technical staff and consultants of the Institute for Creation Research. San Diego, CA: Creation-Life Publishers. ISBN 978-0-89051-003-2. LCCN 74014160. OCLC 1556752.
- Morris, Henry M. (1982). The Troubled Waters of Evolution (2nd ed.). San Diego, CA: Creation-Life Publishers. ISBN 978-0-89051-087-2. LCCN 82083647. OCLC 10143785.
- Morris, Henry M. (1989). The Long War Against God: The History and Impact of the Creation/Evolution Conflict. Grand Rapids, MI: Baker Book House. ISBN 978-0-8010-6257-5. LCCN 89039261. OCLC 20296637.
- Patterson, John W. (1984) [Originally published 1983]. "Thermodynamics and Evolution". In Godfrey, Laurie R. (ed.). Scientists Confront Creationism (Later prt. ed.). New York: W. W. Norton & Company. ISBN 978-0-393-30154-0. LCCN 82012500. OCLC 12399341.
- Pennock, Robert T. (1999). Tower of Babel: The Evidence against the New Creationism. Cambridge, MA: MIT Press. ISBN 978-0-262-16180-0. LCCN 98027286. OCLC 44966044.
- Perry, Marvin; Chase, Myrna; Jacob, Margaret; Jacob, James; Daly, Jonathan W.; Von Laue, Theodore H. (2014). Western Civilization: Ideas, Politics, and Society. Vol. II: Since 1600 (11th ed.). Boston, MA: Cengage Learning. ISBN 978-1-305-09142-9. LCCN 2014943347. OCLC 898154349.
- Plantinga, Alvin (1993). Warrant and Proper Function. New York: Oxford University Press. doi:10.1093/0195078640.001.0001. ISBN 978-0-19-507864-0. LCCN 92000408. OCLC 25628862.
- Popper, Karl (1985) [Originally published 1976]. Unended Quest: An Intellectual Autobiography. La Salle, IL: Open Court. ISBN 978-0-08-758343-6. LCCN 85011430. OCLC 12103887.
- Quine, Willard Van Orman (1953) [Essay originally published 1951 in The Philosophical Review, 60 (1): 20–43]. "Two Dogmas of Empiricism". From a Logical Point of View: Nine Logico-Philosophical Essays. Cambridge, MA: Harvard University Press. LCCN 53005074. OCLC 1470269.
- Ridley, Mark (2004). Evolution (3rd ed.). Malden, MA: Blackwell Publishing. ISBN 978-1-4051-0345-9. LCCN 2003000140. OCLC 51330593.
- Sarfati, Jonathan; Matthews, Mike (2002). Refuting Evolution 2. Green Forest, AR: Master Books. ISBN 978-0-89051-387-3. LCCN 2002113698. OCLC 54206922.
- Scott, Eugenie (2005) [Originally published 2004; Westport, CT: Greenwood Press]. Evolution Vs. Creationism: An Introduction. Foreword by Niles Eldredge (1st pbk. ed.). Berkeley, CA: University of California Press. ISBN 978-0-520-24650-8. LCCN 2005048649. OCLC 60420899.
- Strobel, Lee (2004). The Case for a Creator: A Journalist Investigates Scientific Evidence That Points Toward God. Grand Rapids, MI: Zondervan. ISBN 978-0-310-24144-7. LCCN 2003023566. OCLC 53398125.
- Temple, Frederick (1884). The Relations Between Religion and Science. Eight Lectures Preached Before the University of Oxford in the Year 1884 on the Foundation of the Late Rev. John Bampton, M.A. Bampton Lectures. London: Macmillan and Co. ISBN 978-1-108-00027-7. LCCN 38016289. OCLC 556953.
- Weikart, Richard (2004). From Darwin to Hitler: Evolutionary Ethics, Eugenics, and Racism in Germany (1st ed.). New York: Palgrave Macmillan. ISBN 978-1-4039-6502-8. LCCN 2003065613. OCLC 53485256.
- Wells, Jonathan (2000). Icons of Evolution: Science or Myth?. Washington, D.C.: Regnery Publishing. ISBN 978-0-89526-276-9. LCCN 00062544. OCLC 44768911.
- Yahya, Harun (1999) [Translated from the Turkish edition of 1997]. The Evolution Deceit: The Scientific Collapse of Darwinism and its Ideological Background. Istanbul, Turkey: Okur. ISBN 978-975-8415-00-7. LCCN 2001336710. OCLC 46701250.
- Young, David A. (1988) [Originally published 1982; Grand Rapids, MI: Zondervan]. Christianity and the Age of the Earth. Thousand Oak, CA: Artisan Publishers. ISBN 978-0-934666-27-5. LCCN 81016266. OCLC 20135091.
- Meyer, Stephen C., and Mark Terry. "Darwin's doubt: The explosive origin of animal life and the case for intelligent design." New York (2013).
