= Prosthecobacter fluviatilis =

Scientific classification
- Domain: Bacteria
- Kingdom: Pseudomonadati
- Phylum: Verrucomicrobiota
- Class: Verrucomicrobiae
- Order: Verrucomicrobiales
- Family: Verrucomicrobiaceae
- Genus: Prosthecobacter
- Species: P. fluviatilis

Binomial name
- Prosthecobacter fluviatilis Takeda et al. 2008

Type strain
- HAQ-1

Species of bacterium

Prosthecobacter fluviatilis is a bacterium from the genus Prosthecobacter.
