= Prosthecobacter =

Scientific classification
- Domain: Bacteria
- Kingdom: Pseudomonadati
- Phylum: Verrucomicrobiota
- Class: Verrucomicrobiia
- Order: Verrucomicrobiales
- Family: Verrucomicrobiaceae
- Genus: Prosthecobacter; Staley et al. 1976 ex Staley et al. 1980

Type species
- Prosthecobacter fusiformis Staley et al. 1976 ex Staley et al. 1980

Species
- P. algae; P. debontii; P. dejongeii; P. fluviatilis; P. fusiformis; P. vanneervenii

Synonyms
- Brevifollis Otsuka et al. 2013

Genus of bacteria

Prosthecobacter is a genus of bacteria from the phylum Verrucomicrobiota with a distinctive characteristic; the presence of tubulin-like genes. Tubulins, which are components of the microtubule, have never been observed in Gracilicutes before.

Tubulin was long thought to be specific to eukaryotes. More recently, however, several prokaryotic proteins have been shown to be related to tubulin.

Most bacteria have a homologous structure, FtsZ. Prosthecobacter are the exception to this, containing genes that have higher sequence homology to eukaryotic tubulin than FtsZ.

These genes are called bacterial tubulin a (BtubA) and bacterial tubulin b (BtubB). The properties are not exactly same. However, surface loops and microtubules are extremely similar.

== Phylogeny ==
The currently accepted taxonomy is based on the List of Prokaryotic names with Standing in Nomenclature (LPSN) and National Center for Biotechnology Information (NCBI).

16S rRNA based LTP_10_2024

- Prosthecobacter
  - - P. fluviatilis Takeda et al. 2008
    - P. vanneervenii Hedlund et al. 1998
  - - Brevifollis gellanilyticus Otsuka et al. 2013
    - - P. debontii Hedlund et al. 1998
      - - P. dejongeii Hedlund et al. 1998
        - - P. algae Lee et al. 2014
          - P. fusiformis Staley et al. 1976 ex Staley et al. 1980

120 marker proteins based GTDB 10-RS226

- Prosthecobacter
  - P. vanneervenii
  - - Brevifollis gellanilyticus
    - - P. debontii
      - - P. fusiformis
        - - P. algae
          - P. dejongeii

== See also ==
- List of bacterial orders
- List of bacteria genera
