= Evolution of flagella =

Origin of three known varieties of flagella

The evolution of flagella is of great interest to biologists because the three known varieties of flagella – (eukaryotic, bacterial, and archaeal) each represent a sophisticated cellular structure and the interaction of multiple components.

== Eukaryotic flagellum ==
There are two competing groups of models for the evolutionary origin of the eukaryotic flagellum (referred to as cilium below to distinguish it from its bacterial counterpart). Recent studies on the microtubule organizing center suggest that the most recent ancestor of all eukaryotes already had a complex flagellar apparatus.

=== Endogenous, autogenous and direct filiation models ===
These models argue that cilia developed from pre-existing components of the eukaryotic cytoskeleton (which has tubulin and dynein – also used for other functions) as an extension of the mitotic spindle apparatus. The connection can still be seen, first in the various early-branching single-celled eukaryotes that have a microtubule basal body, where microtubules on one end form a spindle-like cone around the nucleus, while microtubules on the other end point away from the cell and form the cilium. A further connection is that the centriole, involved in the formation of the mitotic spindle in many (but not all) eukaryotes, is homologous to the cilium, and in many cases is the basal body from which the cilium grows.

An intermediate stage between spindle and cilium would be a non-swimming appendage made of microtubules with a function subject to natural selection, such as increasing surface area, helping the protozoan remain suspended in water, increasing the chances of bumping into bacteria to eat, or serving as a stalk attaching the cell to a solid substrate.

Regarding the origin of the individual protein components, a paper on the evolution of dyneins shows that the more complex protein family of ciliary dynein has an apparent ancestor in a simpler cytoplasmic dynein (which itself has evolved from the AAA protein family that occurs widely in all archaea, bacteria and eukaryotes). Long-standing suspicions that tubulin was homologous to FtsZ (based on very weak sequence similarity and some behavioral similarities) were confirmed in 1998 by the independent resolution of the 3-dimensional structures of the two proteins.

=== Symbiotic/endosymbiotic/exogenous models ===
These models argue that the cilium evolved from a symbiotic Gracilicutes (ancestor of spirochete and Prosthecobacter) that attached to a primitive eukaryote or archaebacterium (archaea).

The modern version of the hypothesis was first proposed by Lynn Margulis. The hypothesis, though very well publicized, was never widely accepted by the experts, in contrast to Margulis' arguments for the symbiotic origin of mitochondria and chloroplasts. Margulis did strongly promote and publish versions of this hypothesis until the end of her life.

One primary point in favor of the symbiotic hypothesis was that there are eukaryotes that use symbiotic spirochetes as their motility organelles (some parabasalids inside termite guts, such as Mixotricha and Trichonympha). This is an example of co-option and the flexibility of biological systems, and the proposed homologies that have been reported between cilia and spirochetes have stood up to further scrutiny.

Margulis' hypothesis suggests that an archaea acquired tubulin proteins from a eubacter ancestor of Prosthecobacter. However, the homology of tubulin to the bacterial replication and cytoskeletal protein FtsZ (see Prokaryotic cytoskeleton), which was apparently native in archaea, suggesting an endogenous origin of tubulin rather than a symbiotic transfer.

== Bacterial flagellum ==
YouTube series on bacterial flagella evolution
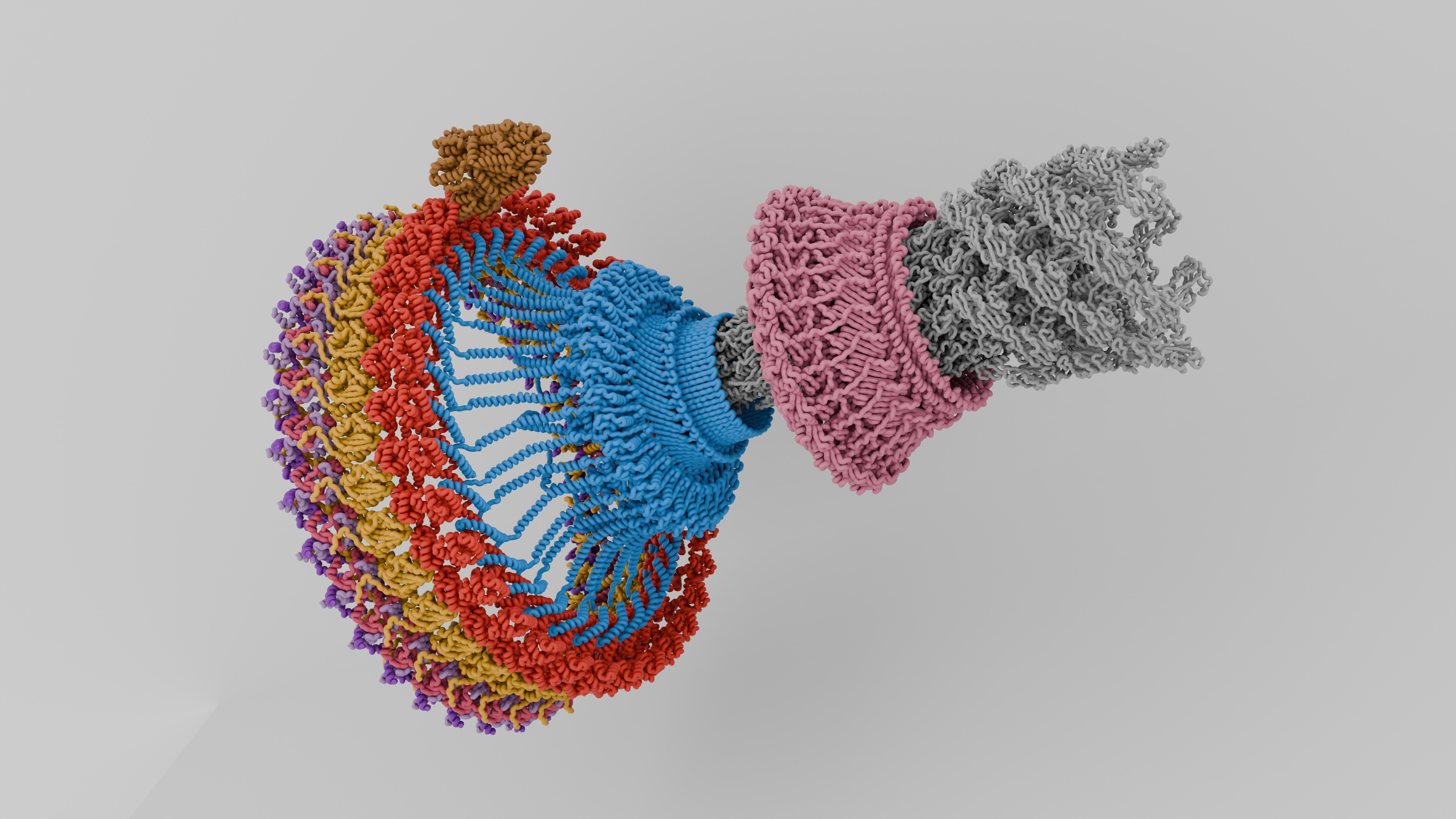
- 01: What we know
- 02: Competence without comprehension
- 03: What good is half a flagellum? (co-option)
- 04: Questions answered

There is good evidence that the bacterial flagellum includes and might even be based on a Type III secretory and transport system, given the similarity of proteins in both systems.

All currently known nonflagellar Type III transport systems serve the function of exporting (injecting) toxin into eukaryotic cells. Similarly, flagella grow by exporting flagellin through the flagellar machinery. It is hypothesised that the flagellum evolved from the type three secretory system. For example, the bubonic plague bacterium Yersinia pestis has an organelle assembly very similar to a complex flagellum, except that it is missing only a few flagellar mechanisms and functions, such as a needle to inject toxins into other cells. As such, the type three secretory system supports the hypothesis that the flagellum evolved from a simpler bacterial secretion system.

However, the true relationship could be the reverse: recent phylogenetic research strongly suggests the type three secretory system evolved from the flagellum through a series of gene deletions.

Reactive oxygen species (ROS) generated by flagellation can cause oxidative damage to DNA and are mutagenic with researchers asking "Did the innovation of a functional flagellum impact either the short- or long-term rate of bacterial evolution?".

=== Eubacterial flagellum ===
Eubacterial flagellum is a multifunctional organelle. It is also one of a range of motility systems in bacteria. The structure of the organelle appears like a motor, shaft and a propeller. However, the structure of eubacterial flagellae varies based on whether their motor systems run on protons or sodium, and on the complexity of the flagellar whip. The evolutionary origin of eubacterial flagellae is probably an example of indirect evolution. A hypothesis on the evolutionary pathway of the eubacterial flagellum argues that a secretory system evolved first, based around the SMC rod- and pore-forming complex. This is presumed to be the common ancestor of the type-III secretory system and the flagellar system. Then, an ion pump was introduced to this structure which improved secretion. The ion pump later became the motor protein. This was followed by the emergence of the proto-flagellar filament as part of the protein-secretion structure. Gliding-twitching motility arose at this stage or later and was then refined into swimming motility.

== Archaeal flagellum ==
The recently elucidated archaeal flagellum, or archaellum, is analogous—but not homologous—to the bacterial one. In addition to no sequence similarity being detected between the genes of the two systems, the archaeal flagellum appears to grow at the base rather than the tip, and is about 15 nanometers (nm) in diameter rather than 20.

Sequence comparison indicates that the archaeal flagellum is homologous to bacterial Type IV pili, filamentous structures outside the cell. Pilus retraction provides enables a different form of bacterial motility called "twitching" or "social gliding" which allows bacterial cells to crawl along a surface, They are assembled through the Type II secretion system. They can also promote swimming, but no species of bacteria is known to use its Type IV pili for both swimming and crawling.

== Further research ==
Testable outlines exist for the origin of each of the three motility systems, and avenues for further research are clear; for prokaryotes, these avenues include the study of secretion systems in free-living, nonvirulent prokaryotes. In eukaryotes, the mechanisms of both mitosis and cilial construction, including the key role of the centriole, need to be much better understood. A detailed survey of the various nonmotile appendages found in eukaryotes is also necessary.

Finally, the study of the origin of all of these systems would benefit greatly from a resolution of the questions surrounding deep phylogeny, as to what are the most deeply branching organisms in each domain, and what are the interrelationships between the domains.

== See also ==
- Last universal ancestor
