= Precambrian rabbit =

Evolutionary biology hypothetical posed by J. B. S. Haldane

"Precambrian rabbits" or "fossil rabbits in the Precambrian" are reported to have been among responses given by the biologist J. B. S. Haldane when asked what evidence could destroy his confidence in the theory of evolution and the field of study. The answers became popular imagery in debates about evolution and the scientific field of evolutionary biology in the 1990s. Many of Haldane's statements about his scientific research were popularized in his lifetime.

Rabbits are mammals, a class of animals whose emergence in the geologic timescale is dated to much later than any found in Precambrian strata. Geological records indicate that although the first true mammals appeared in the Triassic period, modern mammalian orders appeared in the Palaeocene and Eocene epochs of the Palaeogene period, hundreds of millions of years after the Precambrian.

From the perspective of the philosophy of science, it is doubtful whether the genuine discovery of mammalian fossils in Precambrian rocks would overthrow the theory of evolution instantly, though such a discovery would indicate serious errors in modern understanding about the evolutionary process. Some accounts use this response to rebut claims that the theory of evolution is not falsifiable by any empirical evidence. This follows an assertion by Karl Popper, a philosopher of science who proposed that falsifiability distinguishes science from non-science. Popper also expressed doubts about the scientific status of evolutionary theory, although he later concluded that the field of study was genuinely scientific.

== Origin of the phrase ==
Several authors have written that J. B. S. Haldane (1892–1964) said that the discovery of a fossil rabbit in Precambrian rocks would be enough to destroy his belief in evolution. However these references date from the 1990s or later. In 1996 Michael J. Benton cited the 1993 edition of Mark Ridley's book Evolution. Evolutionary biologist Richard Dawkins wrote in 2005 that Haldane was responding to a challenge by a "Popperian zealot". In 2004, Richa Arora wrote that the story was told by John Maynard Smith (1920–2004) in a television programme. John Maynard Smith attributed the phrase to Haldane in a conversation with Paul Harvey in the early 1970s.

== Theoretical background ==
The philosopher Karl Popper held that any scientific proposition must be falsifiable, in other words it must at least be possible to imagine some reproducible experiment or observation whose outcome would disprove the hypothesis. Initially he thought that Charles Darwin's theory of natural selection (often summarized as "the survival of the fittest") was untestable in this sense, and therefore "almost tautological." Popper later changed his view, concluding that the theory of natural selection is falsifiable and that Darwin's own example of the peacock's tail had disproved one extreme variation of it, that all evolution is driven by natural selection. Although in 1978 Popper wrote that his earlier objection had been specifically to the theory of natural selection, in lectures and articles from 1949 to 1974 he had stated that "Darwinism" or "Darwin's theory of evolution" was a "metaphysical research programme" because it was not falsifiable. In fact he continued to express dissatisfaction with contemporary statements of the theory of evolution which focused on population genetics, the study of the relative frequencies of alleles (different forms of the same gene). Some of the adjustments he proposed resembled Lamarckianism or saltationism, evolutionary theories that were and still are considered obsolete, and evolutionary biologists therefore disregarded his criticisms. In 1981 Popper complained that he had been misinterpreted as saying that "historical sciences" such as paleontology or the history of evolution of life on Earth were not genuine sciences, when in fact he believed they could make falsifiable predictions.

Further confusion arose in 1980–1981, when there was a long debate in the pages of Nature about the scientific status of the theory of evolution. Specifically, the argument was on the factors influencing and nature of the unit of selection in the genome, with one side positing natural selection, and the other, neutral mutation. Neither of the parties seriously doubted that the theory was both scientific and, according to current scientific knowledge, true. Some participants objected to statements that appeared to present the theory of evolution as an absolute dogma, however, rather than as a hypothesis that so far has performed very well, and both sides quoted Popper in support of their positions. Evolution critics such as Phillip E. Johnson took this as an opportunity to declare that the theory of evolution was unscientific.

== Would anachronistic fossils disprove evolution? ==
Richard Dawkins said that the discovery of fossil mammals in Precambrian rocks would "completely blow evolution out of the water." Philosopher Peter Godfrey-Smith doubted that a single set of anachronistic fossils, however, even rabbits in the Precambrian, would disprove the theory of evolution outright. The first question raised by the assertion of such a discovery would be whether the alleged "Precambrian rabbits" really were fossilized rabbits. Alternative interpretations might include incorrect identification of the "fossils", incorrect dating of the rocks, and a hoax such as the Piltdown Man was shown to be. Even if the "Precambrian rabbits" turned out to be genuine, they would not instantly refute the theory of evolution, because that theory is a large package of ideas, including: that life on Earth has evolved over billions of years; that this evolution is driven by certain mechanisms; and that these mechanisms have produced a specific "family tree" that defines the relationships among species and the order in which they appeared. Hence, "Precambrian rabbits" would prove that there were one or more serious errors somewhere in this package, and the next task would be to identify those errors.

Benton pointed out that, in the short term, scientists often have to accept the existence of competing hypotheses, each of which explains large parts—but not all—of the observed relevant data.

== Oldest rabbit ==
Genuine fossils of earliest rabbits are from the Eocene Epoch, about 56 million years to 33.9 million years ago. Members of the genus Gomphos are established to be the phylogenetic root of lagomorph rabbits and hares. In 2008 G. elkema was discovered in 2008 in Gujarat, India, the oldest known Gomphos at 53 million years old.

== See also ==
- Out-of-place artifact
- Paluxy River – became famous in 1930s when locals found dinosaur and supposed human footprints in the same rock layer.
