= Prosthecobacter algae =

Scientific classification
- Domain: Bacteria
- Kingdom: Pseudomonadati
- Phylum: Verrucomicrobiota
- Class: Verrucomicrobiae
- Order: Verrucomicrobiales
- Family: Verrucomicrobiaceae
- Genus: Prosthecobacter
- Species: P. algae

Binomial name
- Prosthecobacter algae Lee et al. 2014

Type strain
- EBTL04

Species of bacterium

Prosthecobacter algae is a Gram-negative, facultatively anaerobic and fusiform-shaped bacterium from the genus Prosthecobacter which has been isolated from activated sludge.
