= Brevifollis =

Scientific classification
- Domain: Bacteria
- Kingdom: Pseudomonadati
- Phylum: Verrucomicrobiota
- Class: Verrucomicrobiia
- Order: Verrucomicrobiales
- Family: Verrucomicrobiaceae
- Genus: Brevifollis; Otsuka et al. 2013
- Species: B. gellanilyticus

Binomial name
- Brevifollis gellanilyticus Otsuka et al. 2013

Genus of bacteria

Brevifollis is a Gram-negative genus of bacteria from the family Verrucomicrobiaceae with one known species, Brevifollis gellanilyticus.
