= Wright v. Houston Independent School District =

- Court: United States Court of Appeals for the Fifth Circuit
- Full case name: Rita Wright et al., Plaintiffs, Leona Weber, acting as next friend for Rita Wright, a minor, Plaintiff-Appellant, John R. Brown, Sr., Individually, etc., et al., Intervenors-Appellants, v. The Houston Independent School District et al., Defendants-Appellees.
- Decided: October 10, 1973
- Citation: 486 F.2d 137

Case history
- Prior history: Dismissed, 366 F. Supp. 1208, (S.D. Tex. August 3, 1972).
- Subsequent history: Rehearing en banc denied, November 30, 1973; cert. denied, June 1974; dismissal affirmed

Holding
- The teaching of evolution does not constitute establishment of secular religion; religious protections do not require shielding those from views they find incompatible with their religion; it would be unwarranted intrusion for courts to compel schools to balance curriculum with alternative theories; District Court decision affirmed

Court membership
- Judges sitting: Irving Loeb Goldberg, Charles Clark, Paul Hitch Roney

Case opinions
- Per curiam

Laws applied
- U.S. Const. amend. I, amend. XIV

Wright v. Houston Independent School District, 486 F.2d 137 (5th Cir. 1973) was an American legal case brought by a parent of a student in the Houston Independent School District in Houston, Texas suing on behalf of her daughter and fellow students to prevent the district from teaching evolution as fact and without reference to alternative theories. The plaintiffs claimed evolutionary theory endorsed a secularist religious view, and argued the school's failure to incorporate the teaching of a particular religious alternative to evolutionary theory as derived from the Bible's creation account held that religious view up to ridicule and contempt. To allow evolution while avoiding creationism was unconstitutional, the suit claimed, because it advanced one particular sectarian view over another. The plaintiffs maintained that the school's evolutionary teaching constituted "the establishment of a sectarian, atheistic religion" and was an interference of their own rights to the free exercise of religion as guaranteed by the Establishment Clause in the First Amendment to the Constitution of the United States. The case is one of a series of legal battles over the teaching of evolution in American public schools, and the first to be initiated by opponents of such teaching.

The suit was dismissed prior to trial, the presiding judge for the United States District Court for the Southern District of Texas finding Wright had "wholly failed to establish the analogy" between the teaching of evolution and an establishment of religion. The Court held:

Plaintiffs' case depends in large measure upon their demonstrating a connection between "religion," as employed in the first amendment, and Defendants' approach to the subject of evolution. The Court is convinced that the connection is too tenuous a thread on which to base a first amendment complaint.

The judge, Woodrow B. Seals, outlined three findings. He found the Houston school district was not following any policy to promote secularism. Further, he found the free exercise of religion did not include any such right to be shielded from scientific theories which are incompatible with a particular religious belief. And he rejected the plaintiffs' proposal that the school district be court ordered to provide "equal time" in the curriculum for alternative theories, finding such an order would constitute unwarranted intrusion into the district's affairs.

Wright appealed the decision to the Fifth Circuit Court of Appeals. In 1973 the Appeals Court affirmed the lower court decision dismissing the suit. In June 1974 the United States Supreme Court refused to hear the case, and later lawsuits involving restrictions and impositions on evolution in school curricula reaffirmed the Wright decision.
