= History of the creation–evolution controversy =

Rejection of evolution by religious groups, sometimes called creation–evolution controversy, has a long history. In response to theories developed by scientists, some religious individuals and organizations question the legitimacy of scientific ideas that contradicted the young earth pseudoscientific interpretation of the creation account in Genesis.

== Creation–evolution controversy in the age of Darwin ==
Life timeline
← / Earth formed; ← / Earliest water; ← / LUCA; ← / Earliest fossils; ← / Atmospheric oxygen; ← / Sexual reproduction; ← / Earliest fungi; ← / Neoproterozoic oxygenation event; ← / Ediacaran biota; ← / Cambrian explosion; ← / Earliest tetrapods; ← / Earliest hominoid
(million years ago)

Although the history of evolutionary thought dates back to Empedocles and other Greek philosophers in Europe (5th century BCE), and Taoism in Asia, and the history of evolutionary thought in Christian theology dates back to Augustine of Hippo (4th century) and Thomas Aquinas (13th century), the current creation–evolution controversy originated in Europe and North America in the late 18th century. Discoveries in geology led to various theories of an ancient earth, and fossils showing past extinctions prompted early ideas of evolution, which were particularly controversial in England, where both the natural world and the hierarchical social order were thought to be fixed by God's will. As the terrors of the French Revolution developed into the Napoleonic Wars, followed by economic depression threatening revolution in Great Britain itself, such subversive ideas were rejected, associated only with radical agitators.

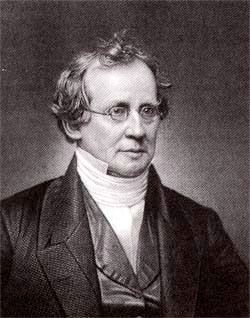
Theologian Charles Hodge, a critic of Charles Darwin's theories, also praised Darwin for his intellectual honesty

Conditions eased with economic recovery, and when Vestiges of the Natural History of Creation was anonymously published in 1844 its ideas of transmutation of species attracted wide public interest despite being attacked by the scientific establishment and many theologians who believed it to be in conflict with their interpretations of the biblical account of life's, especially humanity's, origin and development. However, radical Quakers, Unitarians and Baptists welcomed the book's ideas of "natural law" as supporting their struggle to overthrow the privileges of the Church of England.

Vestiges of the Natural History of Creation remained a best-seller, and paved the way for widespread interest in the theory of natural selection as introduced and published by English naturalist Charles Darwin in his 1859 book, On the Origin of Species. Darwin's book was praised by Unitarians as well as by liberal Anglican theologians whose Essays and Reviews (1860) sparked considerably more religious controversy in Britain than Darwin's publication, as its support of higher criticism questioned the historical accuracy of literal interpretations of the Bible and added declarations that miracles were irrational.

Darwin's book revolutionized the way naturalists viewed the world. The book and its promotion attracted attention and controversy, and many theologians reacted to Darwin's theories. For example, in his 1874 work What is Darwinism? the theologian Charles Hodge argued that Darwin's theories were tantamount to atheism. The controversy was fueled in part by one of Darwin's most vigorous promoters, Thomas Henry Huxley, who opined that Christianity is a "...compound of some of the best and some of the worst elements of Paganism and Judaism, moulded in practice by the innate character of certain people of the Western world..." Perhaps the most uncompromising of the evolutionary philosophers was Ernst Haeckel, who dogmatically affirmed that nothing spiritual exists.

A watershed in the Protestant objections to evolution occurred after about 1875. Previously, citing Louis Agassiz and other scientific luminaries, Protestant contributors to religious quarterlies dismissed Darwin's theories as unscientific. After 1875, it became clear that the majority of naturalists embraced evolution, and a sizable minority of these Protestant contributors rejected Darwin's theory because it called into question the veracity of Scriptures. Even so, virtually none of these dissenters insisted on a young Earth.

The greatest concern for creationists in the late 19th century was the issue of human ancestry. In the words of an 1896 religious tract:

A satirical image of Darwin as an ape from 1871 reflects part of the social controversy over whether humans and apes share a common lineage

I do not wish to meddle with any man's family matters, or quarrel with any one about his relatives. If a man prefers to look for his kindred in the zoological gardens, it is no concern of mine; if he wants to believe that the founder of his family was an ape, a gorilla, a mud-turtle, or a monar, he may do so; but when he insists that I shall trace my lineage in that direction, I say No sir!...I prefer that my genealogical table shall end as it now does, with 'Cainan, which was the son of Seth, which was the son of Adam, which was the son of God,' rather than invent one which reads, 'Which was the son of skeptic, which was the son of monkey, which was the son of oyster, which was the son of monar, which was the son of mud!'—a genealogical table which begins in the mud and ends in the gravel, which has a monar at the head, a monkey in the middle, and an infidel at the tail.

Creationists during this period were largely premillennialists, whose belief in Christ's return depended on a quasi-literal reading of the Bible. However, they were not as concerned about geology, freely granting scientists any time they needed before the Edenic creation to account for scientific observations, such as fossils and geological findings. In the immediate post-Darwinian era, few scientists or clerics rejected the antiquity of the earth, the progressive nature of the fossil record. Likewise, few attached geological significance to the Biblical flood, unlike subsequent creationists. Evolutionary skeptics, creationist leaders and skeptical scientists were usually either willing to adopt a figurative reading of the first chapter of Genesis, or allowed that the six days of creation were not necessarily 24-hour days.

== Scopes trial ==
Initial reactions in the United States matched the developments in Britain, and when Alfred Russel Wallace went there for a lecture tour in 1886–1887 his explanations of "Darwinism" were welcomed without any problems, but attitudes changed after the First World War. The controversy became political when public schools began teaching that man evolved from earlier forms of life per Darwin's theory of natural selection. In response, the U.S. state of Tennessee passed the Butler Act of 1925 prohibiting the teaching of any theory of the origins of humans that contradicted the teachings of the Bible. This law was tested in the highly publicized Scopes Trial of 1925. The law was upheld by the Tennessee Supreme Court, and remained on the books until 1967 when it was repealed. In 1968, the U.S. Supreme Court ruled in Epperson v. Arkansas that banning the teaching of specific theories contravened the Establishment Clause of the First Amendment to the United States Constitution because their primary purpose was religious.

== Biological Sciences Curriculum Study (BSCS) textbooks ==
Work in genetics culminating in the 1937 publication of Genetics and the Origin of Species by Theodosius Dobzhansky, combining Mendelian inheritance with Darwinian natural selection, and explaining, through neutral mutations, the source of the variation upon which evolution acted, led to a synthesis that brought together disparate fields of biology and other sciences into a strong, coherent explanation of evolution. A campaign ensued, urging schools to teach the "fact" of evolution, and in the 1960s, the federally supported Biological Sciences Curriculum Study biology text books were introduced, promoting evolution as the organizing principle of biology. The belief in the power of science amongst biologists was running especially high: One of the prominent creators of the modern evolutionary synthesis, Julian Huxley, made a religion of humanism, saying that a "drastic reorganization of our pattern of religious thought is now becoming necessary, from a god-centered to an evolutionary-centered pattern," and advocating the use of science to further expand human capacities. Meanwhile, public opinion polls suggested that most Americans either believed that God specially created human beings or guided evolution. Membership in churches favoring increasingly literal interpretations of Scripture continued to rise, with the Southern Baptist Convention and Lutheran Church–Missouri Synod outpacing all other denominations. With growth, these churches became better equipped to promulgate a creationist message, with their own colleges, schools, publishing houses, and broadcast media.

With decreasing church membership among evolutionary scientists, the role of opposing the anti-BSCS textbook movement passed from prominent scientists in liberal churches to secular scientists less equipped to reach Christian audiences. Anti-evolutionary forces were able to reduce the number of school districts utilizing BSCS biology text books, but courts continued to prevent religious instruction in public schools.

== ICR and the co-opting of the creationist label ==
John C. Whitcomb and Henry M. Morris' influential The Genesis Flood: The Biblical Record and Its Scientific Implications was published in 1961. The authors argued that creation was literally 6 days long, that humans lived concurrently with dinosaurs, and that God created each kind of life. With publication, Morris became a popular speaker, spreading anti-evolutionary ideas at fundamentalist churches, colleges, and conferences. Morris set up the Creation Science Research Center (CSRC), an organization dominated by Baptists, as an adjunct to the Christian Heritage College. The CSRC rushed publication of biology text books that promoted creationism. These efforts were against the recommendations of Morris, who urged a more cautious and scientific approach. Ultimately, the CSRC broke up, and Morris founded the Institute for Creation Research in 1970. Morris promised that the ICR, unlike the CSRC, would be controlled and operated by scientists. During this time, Morris and others who supported flood geology, adopted the scientific sounding terms scientific creationism and creation science. The flood geologists effectively co-opted "the generic creationist label for their hyperliteralist views." Previously, creationism was a generic term describing a philosophical perspective that presupposes the existence of a supernatural creator.

== The Catholic Church and evolution ==
Among the first recorded responses of a prominent Roman Catholic clergyman to Darwin's theory was that of Saint John Henry Newman, who in 1868, in a letter to a fellow priest, made the following comments:

As to the Divine Design, is it not an instance of incomprehensibly and infinitely marvellous Wisdom and Design to have given certain laws to matter millions of ages ago, which have surely and precisely worked out, in the long course of those ages, those effects which He from the first proposed. Mr Darwin's theory need not then to be atheistical, be it true or not; it may simply be suggesting a larger idea of Divine Prescience and Skill. Perhaps your friend has got a surer clue to guide him than I have, who have never studied the question, and I do not [see] that 'the accidental evolution of organic beings' is inconsistent with divine design — It is accidental to us, not to God.

Some point to the fact that before ordination all Catholic priests have to study the teachings of Thomas Aquinas, who subscribed to an Aristotelian view of evolution, in which he posits that animal species evolve by means of mutations and natural law.

More recent statements have been made by Pope John Paul II and Pope Benedict XVI that also support a theistic understanding of evolution.

The Catechism of the Catholic Church acknowledges the way in which scientific discoveries can complement one's faith:

The question about the origins of the world and of man has been the object of many scientific studies which have splendidly enriched our knowledge of the age and dimensions of the cosmos, the development of life-forms and the appearance of man. These discoveries invite us to even greater admiration for the greatness of the Creator, prompting us to give him thanks for all his works and for the understanding and wisdom he gives to scholars and researchers.

The Church also holds that the question of creation "goes beyond the proper domain of the natural sciences. It is not only a question of knowing when and how the universe arose physically, or when man appeared, but rather of discovering the meaning of such an origin..." Concerning the scriptural accounts of creation in Genesis the Catechism states:

Among all the Scriptural texts about creation, the first three chapters of Genesis occupy a unique place. From a literary standpoint these texts may have had diverse sources. the inspired authors have placed them at the beginning of Scripture to express in their solemn language the truths of creation - its origin and its end in God, its order and goodness, the vocation of man, and finally the drama of sin and the hope of salvation. Read in the light of Christ, within the unity of Sacred Scripture and in the living Tradition of the Church, these texts remain the principal source for catechesis on the mysteries of the "beginning": creation, fall, and promise of salvation.

== The current controversy ==
The controversy continues to this day, with the scientific consensus on the origins and evolution of life actively attacked by creationist organizations and religious groups who desire to uphold other forms of creationism (usually young Earth creationism (YEC), creation science, old Earth creationism or intelligent design (ID)) as an alternative. Most of these groups are explicitly Christian, and more than one sees the debate as part of the Christian mandate to evangelize.

Some see science and religion as being diametrically opposed views which cannot be reconciled. More accommodating viewpoints, held by mainstream churches and some scientists, consider science and religion to be separate categories of thought, which ask fundamentally different questions about reality and posit different avenues for investigating it.

In 1981, Harold J. Morowitz (Professor of Molecular Biophysics and Biochemistry at Yale University) testified in the case of McLean v. Arkansas that dealt with “Balanced Treatment of Creation-Science and Evolution Science in the Public Schools.” The argument had been made in support of creationism that the second law of thermodynamics precludes biogenesis by a natural process; therefore there was a requirement for supernatural events. According to the second law, isolated systems move towards the maximum degree of molecular disorder. In this case, isolation means the absence of flows of both energy and matter into and out of the system. In his expert testimony, Morowitz noted that in 1886 the physicist Ludwig Boltzmann had clearly pointed out that the Earth is an open system undergoing a flow of energy from the sun, and, because of this, the surface of the Earth is not limited by a law that is restricted to isolated entities. Morowitz also pointed out that developments in the field of irreversible thermodynamics introduced by Lars Onsager indicate that systems become ordered under a flow of energy. Morowitz therefore concluded that the existence of life involves no contradictions to physical laws.

More recently, the intelligent design movement has taken an anti-evolution position which avoids any direct appeal to religion. However, Leonard Krishtalka, a paleontologist and an opponent of the movement, has called intelligent design "nothing more than creationism in a cheap tuxedo," and, in Kitzmiller v. Dover Area School District (2005) United States District Judge John E. Jones III ruled that "intelligent design is not science," but is "grounded in theology" and "cannot uncouple itself from its creationist, and thus religious, antecedents." Before the trial began, U.S. President George W. Bush commented endorsing the teaching of intelligent design alongside evolution "I felt like both sides ought to be properly taught ... so people can understand what the debate is about." Scientists argue that intelligent design does not represent any research program within the scientific community, and is opposed by most of the same groups who oppose creationism.

== Timeline of the controversy ==
- 1650 – Church of Ireland Archbishop of Armagh James Ussher states that the universe was created in 4004 BC, in direct conflict with the former prevailing Aristotelian view of a cyclical and eternal earth.
- 1785 – James Hutton presented his theory of uniformitarianism, explaining that the Earth must be much older than previously supposed to allow time for mountains to be eroded and for sediment to form new rocks at the bottom of the sea, which in turn were raised up to become dry land.
- 1794 to 1796 – Erasmus Darwin published Zoonomia with ideas on evolution and all warm-blooded animals arising from one living filament.
- 1802 – William Paley publishes Natural Theology: or, Evidences of the Existence and Attributes of the Deity which uses the watchmaker analogy to argue for the existence of God from signs of intelligent design in the living world.
- 1809 – Jean-Baptiste Lamarck proposed a theory of evolution by acquired characteristics, later known as Lamarckism.
- 1830 to 1833 – Charles Lyell published Principles of Geology denigrating catastrophism.
- 1836 – William Buckland, theologian and geologist, publishes Geology and Mineralogy considered with reference to Natural Theology which was sixth in the Bridgewater Treatises series and rejected a global flood.
- 1844 – Robert Chambers anonymously published the Vestiges of the Natural History of Creation.
- 1857 – Philip Henry Gosse published Omphalos: An Attempt to Untie the Geological Knot.
- 1859 – Charles Darwin published On the Origin of Species regarding the theory of evolution, after over 20 years of research and discovery. Darwin was prompted to publish by the publication of an essay by Alfred Russel Wallace, which independently summarized the theory. The theory's most profound element, "natural selection," challenged the generally accepted idea of divine intervention in species formation, leading to strong reactions to Darwin's theory.
- 1860 – Liberal theologians published Essays and Reviews supporting Darwin. A debate of Darwin's theory was arranged at the Oxford University Museum, with Thomas Henry Huxley among its defenders and Samuel Wilberforce, the Bishop of Oxford, leading its critics. Later accounts indicate Sir Joseph Dalton Hooker was most vocal in defending Darwinism.
- 1923 – The New Geology by Seventh-day Adventist George McCready Price was inspiration and basis for Whitcomb and Morris' The Genesis Flood (see 1961 below).
- 1925 – The Scopes Trial tested the new Butler Act, which made it illegal to teach that man descended from animals in public schools. Scopes was found guilty and fined $100; prosecution lawyer William Jennings Bryan offered to pay it, but it was later set aside on a technicality after appeal to the Tennessee Supreme Court.
- 1950 – Pope Pius XII issued the papal encyclical Humani Generis, which states that evolution is compatible with Christianity insofar as to discover "the origin of the human body as coming from pre-existent and living matter," but that to apply evolution to matters of spirituality is inappropriate. The Roman Catholic Church has since refined its interpretations of Genesis as symbolic of spirituality.
- 1958 – The National Science Foundation started the Biological Sciences Curriculum Study, which emphasizes evolution in high school biology textbooks. This was part of a broad-based improvement of education in the United States in response to the launch of the Soviet Union's Sputnik 1 satellite. (See Sputnik crisis; New Math)
- 1961 – The Genesis Flood: The Biblical Record and Its Scientific Implications by John C. Whitcomb and Henry M. Morris reinvigorated the creationist movement.
- 1968 – A U.S. Supreme Court ruling in the Epperson v. Arkansas case repealed all remaining creationist laws. The Court supported a District Court ruling that a 1928 Arkansas law violated the Establishment Clause because it prohibited the teaching of evolution.
- 1973 – Tennessee passed a law requiring textbooks with a theory of origin to give equal emphasis to the Genesis account of creation. In 1975, the law was ruled unconstitutional in Daniel v. Waters as a violation of the Establishment Clause.
- 1981 – The state of Arkansas adopts a law known as the "Balanced Treatment for Creation-Science and Evolution-Science Act" (Act 590). A ruling from the United States District Court for the Eastern District of Arkansas in McLean v. Arkansas (1982) found the law to be a violation of the Establishment Clause.
- 1987 – The U.S. Supreme Court ruled in Edwards v. Aguillard that a Louisiana law requiring that creation science be taught in public schools, along with evolution, was unconstitutional because the law was specifically intended to advance a particular religion.
- 1991 – Darwin on Trial by Phillip E. Johnson initiated the intelligent design movement.
- 1996 – Michael J. Behe wrote Darwin's Black Box, which proposed that some biological systems are irreducibly complex.
- 1996 – On October 22, Pope John Paul II sent the message to the Pontifical Academy of Sciences, stating that "new knowledge" requires one to realize that evolution is "more than a hypothesis."
- 1999 – On August 11, the Kansas State Board of Education deleted discussion of evolution and the Big Bang from standards relating to state assessments.
- 2001 – The Kansas State Board of Education reinstated the discussion of evolution and the Big Bang after the removal of three board members.
- 2002 – After much debate, the Ohio State Board of Education partially adopted the new "Teach the Controversy" initiative of intelligent design activists. In 2004, the board created a "Critical Analysis of Evolution" lesson plan for teachers.
- 2004 – On January 30, former U.S. President Jimmy Carter released a statement condemning the suggestion that the word "evolution" be banned from textbooks used in schools in the state of Georgia.
- 2004 – On February 19, Italian Education Minister Letizia Moratti issued a legislative decree that Italian children will learn about creationism. On April 23, top Italian scientists responded with an open letter and a petition, signed by more than 50,000 citizens, claiming that her proposal would sacrifice the "scientific curiosity of youth." Moratti clarified that her proposal did not ban the teaching of evolution, but rescinded the decree nonetheless and even acted to bolster the presence of evolution in Italian academic curricula.
- 2004 – On July 23, the International Theological Commission issued a document, Communion and Stewardship: Human Persons Created in the Image of God.
- 2005 – The Kansas State Board of Education "scheduled six days of courtroom-style hearings" concerning the teaching of evolution.
- 2005 – In September, parents in the Dover Area School District legally challenged intelligent design after a statement read to students claimed that there are "gaps" in evolution and that intelligent design is an alternative about which they can learn from the textbook Of Pandas and People. In December, the federal court in Harrisburg, Pennsylvania, issued a sweeping decision asserting that intelligent design is just another name for creationism, that it is not science, and that it cannot be taught as science in public schools.
- 2005 – In November, eight of the nine-member Dover, Pennsylvania, school board were voted out and replaced with a coalition of Democratic and Republican candidates who oppose the previous board's decision to introduce intelligent design and lay doubts on evolution. The coalition ran on the Democratic ticket. The newly elected board members agreed to not appeal the court decision in Kitzmiller and have removed the intelligent design requirements from the school district's curriculum. (See Teaching Intelligent Design: Incumbent Dover PA school board fails reelection.)
- 2005 – On December 20, the court in Kitzmiller v. Dover Area School District issued its ruling that intelligent design is a form of creationism, and that the school board policy requiring the presentation of intelligent design as an alternative to evolution as an "explanation of the origin of life" thus violated the Establishment Clause. In his ruling, the judge wrote that intelligent design is not science and is essentially religious in nature.
- 2007 – Creation and Evolution: A Conference with Pope Benedict XVI in Castel Gandolfo is first published in German. While concluding a holiday in northern Italy, Pope Benedict XVI commented, "This clash [between evolution and creationism] is an absurdity because on one hand there is much scientific proof in favor of evolution, which appears as a reality that we must see and which enriches our understanding of life and being as such."

== See also ==
- Rejection of evolution by religious groups
- History of creationism
- History of evolutionary thought

== Citations ==
- Burns, Edward M.; Ralph, Philip Lee; Lerner, Robert E.; Standish, Meacham (1982). World Civilizations: Their History and Their Culture (Sixth ed.). New York: W. W. Norton & Company. ISBN 978-0-393-95077-9. LCCN 81018858. OCLC 7998534.
- Desmond, Adrian; Moore, James (1991). Darwin. London; New York: Michael Joseph; Viking Penguin. ISBN 978-0-7181-3430-3. LCCN 92196964. OCLC 26502431.
- Dessain, Charles Stephen; Gornall, Thomas, eds. (1973). "The Oratory Bm May 22/68". The Letters and Diaries of John Henry Newman (Letter to J. Walker of Scarborough on Darwin's theory of evolution, May 22, 1868). Vol. XXIV. Oxford: Clarendon Press. pp. 77–78. OCLC 59190720.
- Dewey, John (1994). "The Influence of Darwinism on Philosophy". In Martin Gardner (ed.). Great Essays in Science. Buffalo, NY: Prometheus Books. ISBN 978-0-87975-853-0. LCCN 93035453. OCLC 28846489.
- Hayward, James L. (1998). The Creation/Evolution Controversy: An Annotated Bibliography. Magill Bibliographies. Lanham, MD; Pasadena, CA: Scarecrow Press; Salem Press. ISBN 978-0-8108-3386-9. LCCN 98003138. OCLC 38496519.
- Hodge, Charles (1874). What is Darwinism?. New York: Scribner, Armstrong, and Company. LCCN 06012878. OCLC 1004320.
- Huxley, Julian (1957). "Transhumanism". New Bottles for New Wine. New York: Harper & Brothers. OCLC 550463. Archived from the original on 2011-05-22.
- Huxley, Julian (1964). "The New Divinity". Essays of a Humanist. New York: Harper & Row. OCLC 550466. Archived from the original on 2021-02-11.
- Huxley, Thomas Henry (1902) [Originally published 1894]. "An Episcopal Trilogy [1887]". Science and Christian Tradition: Essays. Vol. V. New York: D. Appleton & Company. pp. 126–159. ISBN 978-1-4179-7372-9. LCCN 41030619. OCLC 634917253.
- Larson, Edward J. (1997). Summer for the Gods: The Scopes Trial and America's Continuing Debate Over Science and Religion. New York: Basic Books. ISBN 978-0-465-07509-6. LCCN 97009648. OCLC 36430743.
- Larson, Edward J. (2004). Evolution: The Remarkable History of a Scientific Theory. New York: Modern Library. ISBN 978-0-679-64288-6. LCCN 2003064888. OCLC 53483597.
- Numbers, Ronald L. (2006) [Originally published 1992 as The Creationists: The Evolution of Scientific Creationism; New York: Alfred A. Knopf]. The Creationists: From Scientific Creationism to Intelligent Design (Expanded ed., 1st Harvard University Press pbk. ed.). Cambridge, MA: Harvard University Press. ISBN 978-0-674-02339-0. LCCN 2006043675. OCLC 69734583.
- Numbers, Ronald L. (1998). Darwinism Comes to America. Cambridge, MA: Harvard University Press. ISBN 978-0-674-19312-3. LCCN 98016212. OCLC 38747194.
- Schuster, Peter; Spaemann, Robert; Erbrich, Paul; Christoph Cardinal Schönborn; Wiedenhofer, Siegfried (2008) [Originally published 2007; Augsburg: Sankt Ulrich Verlag GmbH]. Horn, Stephan Otto; Wiedenhofer, Siegfried (eds.). Creation and Evolution: A Conference with Pope Benedict XVI in Castel Gandolfo. Foreword by Christoph Cardinal Schönborn; translation from German by Michael J. Miller. San Francisco, CA: Ignatius Press. ISBN 978-1-58617-234-3. LCCN 2007938139. OCLC 228425433. "Papers from a conference held at Castel Gandolfo, Italy, Sept. 2006."
