= History of creationism =

The history of creationism relates to the history of thought based on the premise that the natural universe had a beginning, and came into being supernaturally. The term creationism in its broad sense covers a wide range of views and interpretations, and was not in common use before the late 19th century. Throughout recorded history, a number of people have viewed the universe as a created entity. Multiple ancient historical accounts from around the world refer to or imply a creation of the Earth and universe. Although specific historical understandings of creationism have used varying degrees of empirical, spiritual and/or philosophical investigations, they are all based on the view that the universe was created. The Genesis creation narrative has provided a basic framework for Jewish and Christian epistemological understandings of how the universe came into being – through the divine intervention of the God, Yahweh. Historically, literal interpretations of this narrative were more dominant than allegorical ones.

From the 18th century on, various views aimed at reconciling the Abrahamic religions and Genesis with geology, biology and other sciences developed in Western culture. At this time, the word creationism referred to a doctrine of creation of the soul. Those holding that species had been created in a separate act, such as Philip Gosse in 1857, were generally called "advocates of creation", though they were also called "creationists" in private correspondence between Charles Darwin and his friends, dating from 1856.

In the 20th century the word "creationism" became associated with the anti-evolution movement of the 1920s and young Earth creationism, but this usage was contested by other groups, such as old Earth creationists and evolutionary creationists, who hold different concepts of creation, such as the acceptance of the age of the Earth and biological evolution as understood by the scientific community.

The Genesis Flood (1961) became the most successful young earth creationist publication after 1945. From the mid-1960s, creationists in the United States promoted the teaching of "scientific creationism" using "Flood geology" in public school science classes. After the legal judgment of the case Daniel v. Waters (1975) ruled that teaching creationism in public schools contravened the Establishment Clause of the First Amendment to the United States Constitution, the content was stripped of overt biblical references and renamed creation science. When the court case Edwards v. Aguillard (1987) ruled that creation science similarly contravened the constitution, all references to "creation" in a draft school textbook were changed to refer to intelligent design, which was presented by creationists as a new scientific theory. The Kitzmiller v. Dover (2005) ruling concluded that intelligent design is not science and contravenes the constitutional restriction on teaching religion in public school science classes. In September 2012, Bill Nye ("The Science Guy") expressed his concern that creationist views threaten science education and innovations in the United States.

== Creation and modern science ==
In the 15th and 16th centuries, discoveries in new lands brought knowledge of the diversity of life. In 1605, Francis Bacon emphasized that the works of God in nature teach us how to interpret the Bible, and the Baconian method introduced the empirical approach which became central to modern science. Natural theology sought evidence in nature supporting an active role of God, and attempts were made to reconcile new knowledge with the biblical deluge myth and story of Noah's Ark. The development of modern geology in the 18th and 19th centuries found geological strata and fossil sequences indicating an ancient Earth. The diluvial cosmogonies fell victim to their own success, as the spirit of scientific inquiry they had stimulated, gradually led to discoveries that undercut the biblical premises of flood geology and catastrophism.

From around the start of the 19th century, ideas such as Jean-Baptiste Lamarck's concept of transmutation of species had gained supporters in Paris and Edinburgh, mostly amongst anatomists. The anonymous publication of Vestiges of the Natural History of Creation in 1844 aroused wide public interest with support from Quakers and Unitarians, but was strongly criticised by the religious establishment and the scientific community, which called for solidly backed science. In 1859, Charles Darwin's On the Origin of Species provided that evidence from an authoritative and respected source, and within a decade or so convinced scientists that evolution occurs. This view clashed with that of conservative evangelicals in the Church of England, but in 1860 their attention turned to the much greater uproar about Essays and Reviews by liberal Anglican theologians, which introduced "higher criticism", a hermeneutic method re-examining the Bible and questioning literal readings. By 1875 most American naturalists supported ideas of theistic evolution, often involving special creation of human beings.

At this time those holding that species had been separately created were generally called "advocates of creation," but they were occasionally called "creationists" in private correspondence between Charles Darwin and his friends. The term appears in letters Darwin wrote between 1856 and 1863, and was also used in a response by Charles Lyell.

By this time, geologists recognised that the Earth was millions of years old. The exact chronology proposed by Darwin was disputed by other geologists, and the leading physicist William Thomson (later ennobled as Lord Kelvin) produced an analyses of the heat energy and thermal histories of the Earth and Sun which yielded age estimates that were too short for gradual evolution. Thomson's colleague Fleeming Jenkin wrote an 1867 review of Darwin's On the Origin of Species which opposed evolution on the basis of the shortened time available. Kelvin's age paradox was not resolved until it was discovered in the 20th century that the Earth is heated by radioactive decay, that its internal thermal gradient is affected by mantle convection, and that the Sun is heated by nuclear fusion.

Since the 1980s, the Big Bang theory has been the prevailing cosmological model for the universe. It was envisioned by a Roman Catholic priest, Monsignor Georges Lemaître in the 1930s. Lemaître suggested that the evident expansion of the universe, if projected back in time, meant that at some finite time in the past all the mass of the universe was concentrated into a single point, a "primeval atom" where and when the fabric of time and space came into existence. However, in the 1920s and 1930s almost every major cosmologist subscribed to a view that the universe is in an eternal steady state. After Lemaître proposed his theory, some scientists complained that its assumption that time had a beginning amounted to a reimportation of religious concepts into physics. When the expression "Big Bang" was coined by Fred Hoyle in 1949, he meant it to be slightly pejorative, but the term stuck and gained currency. Lemaître himself concluded that an initial "creation-like" event must have occurred. The Big Bang is contrary to young-Earth creationism, sensu stricto. But it has been welcomed by other Christian creeds, and it is in line with the Roman Catholic concept of creation. Under the Anthropic principle, by which the properties of the universe is seemingly fine-tuned for life to exist, some Christians see evidence that a divine creator has purposefully designed the universe.

== Pre-scientific era ==
Life timeline
| ← / Earth formed; ← / Earliest water; ← / LUCA; ← / Earliest fossils; ← / Great Oxygenation Event; ← / Sexual reproduction; ← / Earliest fungi; ← / Neoproterozoic oxygenation event; ← / Ediacaran biota; ← / Cambrian explosion; ← / Earliest tetrapods; ← / Earliest hominoid |
(million years ago)

=== Early history ===
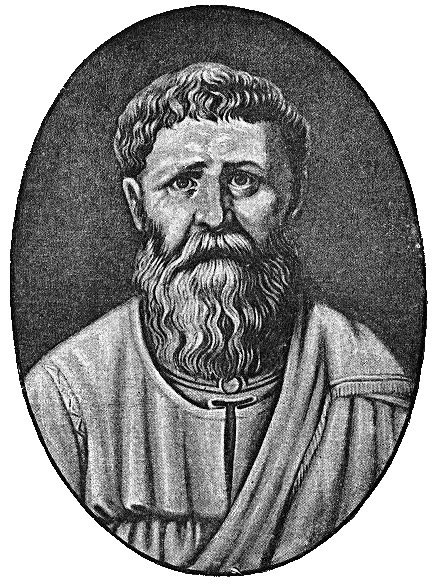
St. Augustine of Hippo

David Sedley, in his book Creationism and Its Critics in Antiquity, traces creationist thought to the presocratic thinkers Anaxagoras and Empedocles, in the 5th century BCE. Sedley states that Anaxagoras was recognized by Plato as "the first overt champion of a creative cosmic intelligence". Anaxagoras's theory was that the original state of the world was a roughly even mixture of all opposites, and that it was the effect of the action of nous (intelligence or mind) that led to the partial separation of such opposites, hot from cold, land from water, rarefied from dense. Anaxagoras also developed the philosophical innovation of dualism of mind from matter, diverging from the stringent monism of his predecessor, Parmenides. Empedocles proposed a system whereby two competing divine forces, Love (harmony and blending) and Strife (separation) had alternating dominion over the universe and the four elements, earth, water, air and fire.

Around 45 BCE, Cicero made a teleological argument that anticipated the watchmaker analogy, in De natura deorum, ii. 34

When you see a sundial or a water-clock, you see that it tells the time by design and not by chance. How then can you imagine that the universe as a whole is devoid of purpose and intelligence, when it embraces everything, including these artifacts themselves and their artificers? (Gjertsen 1989, p. 199, quoted by Dennett 1995, p. 29)

170 – Galen, Stoic Roman physician wrote against creation beliefs in On the Usefulness of the Parts of the Body, 11.14:

It is precisely this point in which our own opinion and that of Plato and of the other Greeks who follow the right method in natural science differ from the position taken up by Moses. For the latter it seems enough to say that God simply willed the arrangement of matter and it was presently arranged in due order; for he believes everything to be possible with God, even should he wish to make a bull or a horse out of ashes. We, however, do not hold this; we say that certain things are impossible by nature and that God does not even attempt such things at all but that he [sic] chooses the best out of the possibility of becoming.

In the 5th century, Saint Augustine wrote The Literal Meaning of Genesis in which he argued that Genesis should be interpreted as God forming the Earth and life from pre-existing matter and allowed for an allegorical interpretation of the first chapter of Genesis. For example: he argues that the six-day structure of creation presented in the book of Genesis represents a logical framework, rather than the passage of time in a physical way. On the other hand, Augustine called for a historical view of the remainder of the history recorded in Genesis, including the creation of Adam and Eve, and the Flood. Apart from his specific views, Augustine recognizes that the interpretation of the creation story is difficult, and remarks that Christians should be willing to change their minds about it as new information comes up. He also warned believers not to rashly interpret things literally that might be allegorical, as it would discredit the faith.

610–632 – Muhammad reports receiving the Qur'an by divine revelation. The Qur'an holds a number of the core concepts of creationism, including a 6-day creation, Adam and Eve, Enoch, and Noah's Ark, but also provides some details absent from Genesis, including reference to a fourth son of Noah who chose not to enter the ark. Through Islam, creation beliefs and monotheism replace paganism among the Arabs.

=== Renaissance and protoscience ===
Creation of the Animals by Tintoretto, c. 1550. Gallerie dell'Accademia, Venice

The Renaissance starting in the 14th century saw the establishment of protoscience that eventually became modern science. This was a period of great social change.

The Protestant Reformation introduced lay people reading the Bible in translation and more literal understandings, and led to a new belief that every biological species had been individually created by God.

==== Protoscience ====
The Baconian method introduced the empirical scientific method. Natural theology sought evidence in nature supporting Christianity.

Nicolaus Copernicus's idea of Heliocentrism was proposed in the 16th century and established by Galileo Galilei, Johannes Kepler and Newton. This overturned the Greek Ptolemaic system of geocentrism, which had been adopted as Church dogma with the fusion of Christianity with Greek Philosophy in the first few centuries CE.

The English naturalist John Ray (1627–1705) is sometimes referred to as the father of English natural history. As well as collecting and classifying plants, he wrote two books entitled The Wisdom of God manifested in the Works of the Creation (1691), and Miscellaneous Discourses concerning the Dissolution and Changes of the World (1692), which included essays on The Primitive Chaos and Creation of the World, The General Deluge, its Causes and Effects, and The Dissolution of the World and Future Conflagrations. In The Wisdom of God he included a number of the familiar examples of purposive adaptation and design in nature (the teleological argument), such as the structure of the eye, the hollowness of the bones, the camel's stomach and the hedgehog's armor.

In April 1630, Descartes wrote three letters to the father Mersenne, which exposed for the first time his Creation Doctrine. Descartes affirmed God creates the eternal truths and the material and extended world with a uninterrupted, free and voluntaristic work. This conception was subsequently developed in the fifth and Sixth Replies to the objections to his meditations. Descartes was influenced by the Francisco Suarez's view on primitivism and divine realism, for which the connections between properties of the real world (e.g. 'being a man' and 'being an animal') belong immutably to the essence and intellect of God the Creator from ever and forever, and therefore aren't created by Him.

Carl Linnaeus, in the 18th century, established a system of classification of species by similarity. At the time, the system of classification was seen as the plan of organization used by God in his creation. Later, the theory of evolution applied it as groundwork for the idea of common descent.

==== Religious arguments ====
In 1650 the Church of Ireland Archbishop of Armagh, James Ussher, published a monumental history of the world from creation to 70 A.D. He used the recorded genealogies and ages in the bible to derive what is commonly known as the Ussher chronology. This calculated a date for creation at 4004 BCE. The date was widely accepted in the English-speaking world.

In 1696, William Whiston published A New Theory of the Earth, in which he proposed an account of the creation of the world. He grounded his argument in the following three Postulata:

1) The obvious or literal sense of scripture is the true and real one, where no evidence can be given to the contrary.
2) That which is clearly accountable in a natural way, is not, without reason to be ascribed to a miraculous power.
3) What ancient tradition asserts of the constitution of nature, or of the origin and primitive states of the world, is to be allowed for true, where 'tis fully agreeable to scripture, reason, and philosophy.

Whiston was the first to propose that the global flood was caused by the water in the tail of a comet.

The English divine William Derham (1657–1735) published his Artificial Clockmaker in 1696 and Physico-Theology in 1713. These books were teleological arguments for the being and attributes of God, and were used by Paley nearly a century later.

The Watchmaker analogy was put by Bernard Nieuwentyt (1730) and referred to several times by Paley. A charge of wholesale plagiarism from this book was brought against Paley in the Athenaeum for 1848, but the famous illustration of the watch was not peculiar to Nieuwentyt, and had been appropriated by a number of others before Paley.

David Hume (1711–1776), a Scottish naturalist, empiricist, and skeptic, argued for naturalism and against belief in God. He argued that order stems from both design and natural processes, so it is not necessary to infer a designer when one sees order; that the design argument, even if it worked, would not support a robust or even moral God, that the argument begged the question of the origin of God, and that design was merely a human projection onto the forces of nature. For philosopher James D. Madden, it is "Hume, rivaled only by Darwin, [who] has done the most to undermine in principle our confidence in arguments from design among all figures in the Western intellectual tradition".

== Scientific era ==
=== Modern geology and gap theory ===
James Hutton is often viewed as the first modern geologist. In 1785 he presented a paper entitled Theory of the Earth to the Royal Society of Edinburgh. Based upon a detailed examination of what we now recognise as the lithosphere, hydrosphere and atmosphere he showed that the present forces seen on the earth were sufficient to explain all the phenomena observed. He wrote "The Mosaic history places this beginning of man at no great distance; and there has not been found, in natural history, any document by which a high antiquity can be attributed to the human race. But this is not the case with regard to the inferior species of animals, particularly those which inhabit the ocean and its shorees. We find in natural history monuments which prove that those animals had long existed; and thus we thus preocure a measure for the computation of time extremely remote though far from being precisely ascertained." Based upon these principles of uniformitarianism, he demonstrated that the Earth is much older than had previously been supposed in order to allow enough time for mountains to be eroded and for sediment to form new rocks at the bottom of the sea, which in turn were raised up to become dry land. The presumption that the world was only 6,000 years old was scientifically abandoned as a result of Hutton's work.

This development of the scientific discipline of geology, in the late 18th and early 19th centuries, and the discovery that the Earth was far older than a literal interpretation of the Book of Genesis could account for, led to the development, and popularity, of the Gap Theory (now known as gap creationism) to accommodate these discoveries. Gap Theory assumes a recent six-day creation, but also that the Earth existed for ages before this event, ending in cataclysm and a new creation (hence its alternative title 'ruin-restoration theory').

In the early 19th century, "a heterogeneous group of writers," known as scriptural geologists, arose to oppose these discoveries, and the Gap Theory. Their views were marginalised and ignored by the scientific community of their time. They "had much the same relationship to 'philosophical' (or scientific) geologists as their indirect descendants, the twentieth-century creationists." Paul Wood describes them as "mostly Anglican evangelicals" with "no institutional focus and little sense of commonality." They generally lacked any background in geology, and had little influence even in church circles.

From 1830 to 1833, the geologist and clergyman Sir Charles Lyell released a three volume publication called Principles of Geology, which developed Hutton's ideas of uniformitarianism, and in the second volume set out a gradualist variation of creation beliefs in which each species had its "centre of creation" and was designed for the habitat, but would become extinct when the habitat changed. John Herschel supported this gradualist view and wrote to Lyell urging a search for natural laws underlying the "mystery of mysteries" of how species formed.

In 1857, Philip Henry Gosse published Omphalos: Untying the Geological Knot. The Omphalos hypothesis argued that the World had been created by God recently, but with the appearance of old age. This was largely ignored, and some considered it blasphemous because it accused the Creator of deceit. Some young Earth creationists would later incorporate parts of his arguments.

=== Pre-Darwinian biology ===
Erasmus Darwin published his Zoönomia between 1794 and 1796 foreshadowing Lamarck's ideas on evolution, and even suggesting "that all warm-blooded animals have arisen from one living filament, which the great First Cause endued with animality ... possessing the faculty of continuing to improve by its own inherent activity, and of delivering down these improvements by generation to its posterity."

Advances in paleontology, led by William Smith, saw the recording of the first fossil records that showed the transmutation of species. Then, Jean-Baptiste Lamarck proposed, in his Philosophie Zoologique of 1809, a theory of evolution, later known as Lamarckism, by which traits that were "needed" were passed on.

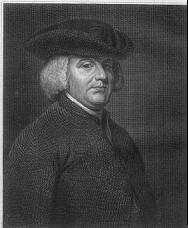
William Paley (1743–1805), proponent of the Watchmaker analogy, a variant of the teleological argument

In 1802, William Paley published Natural Theology in response to naturalists such as Hume, refining the ancient teleological argument (or argument from design) to argue for the existence of God. He argued that life was so intricately designed and interconnected as to be analogous to a watch. Just as when one finds a watch, one reasonably infers that it was designed and constructed by an intelligent being, although one has never seen the designer, when one observes the complexity and intricacy of life, one may reasonably infer that it was designed and constructed by God, although one has never seen God.

The official eight Bridgewater Treatises "On the Power, Wisdom and Goodness of God, as manifested in the Creation" included the Reverend William Buckland's 1836 Geology and Mineralogy considered with reference to Natural Theology setting out the logic of day-age, gap theory, and theistic evolution. The computing pioneer Charles Babbage then published his unofficial Ninth Bridgewater Treatise in 1837, putting forward a thesis that God had the omnipotence and foresight to create as a divine legislator, making laws (or programs) that then produced species at the appropriate times, rather than continually interfering with ad hoc miracles each time a new species was required.

By 1836 the anatomist Richard Owen had theories influenced by Johannes Peter Müller that living matter had an "organising energy," a life-force that directed the growth of tissues and also determined the lifespan of the individual and of the species. In the 1850s Owen developed ideas of "archetypes" in the divine mind producing a sequence of species in "ordained continuous becoming" in which new species appeared at birth.

Late in 1844 the anonymous publication of Vestiges of the Natural History of Creation popularised the idea of divinely ordered development of everything from stellar evolution to transmutation of species. It quickly gained fashionable success in court circles and aroused interest in all sections of society. It also aroused religious controversy, and after initially being slow to respond, the scientific establishment attacked the book. It continued to be a best seller to around the end of the century.

Herbert Spencer was a 19th-century English philosopher who developed ideas about the unifying concept of evolution across the natural and social sciences. Spencer is the first to develop a theory of cultural evolution and is considered by some to be the father of Social Darwinism. It is also he and not Darwin who coined the phrase survival of the fittest. Much of the positivist ideas of progress that dominated the social science philosophy of Spencer and subsequent Social Darwinists has been criticized by present-day sociologists, but such ideas continue to be one of the major critiques made by creationists against evolution in general, even though strict biological evolution does not depend on it nor offer any type of endorsement of so-called "Social Darwinism" or its derivative philosophies such as eugenics.

== Age of Darwin ==
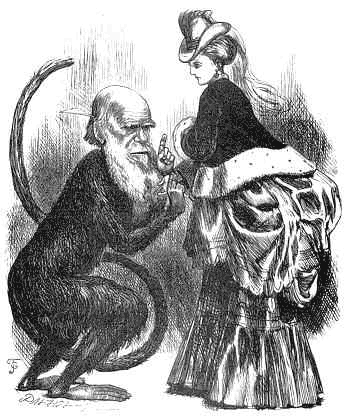
When Darwin appeared in public with a beard in 1866, cartoonists were quick to satirise his ideas about common descent with apes. In this 1872 cartoon Darwin is fascinated by the apparent steatopygia in the new fashion for bustles. The woman asks him to "leave my emotions alone," a reference to Darwin's new book The Expression of the Emotions in Man and Animals.

The decades following Charles Darwin's publication of The Origin of Species, in 1859, saw the overwhelming majority of North American and British naturalists accept some form of evolution, with multiple liberal and educated churchmen following their example, and thereby rejecting a biblically literalist interpretation of Genesis. Although Darwin's work rejected "the dogma of separate creations," he invoked creation as the probable source of the first lifeforms ("into which life was first breathed"). This led Asa Gray, who was both religiously orthodox, and Darwin's most prominent American supporter, to suggest that Darwin had accepted "a supernatural beginning of life on earth" and that he should therefore allow a second "special origination" for humanity. Darwin however rejected this view, and used uncompromisingly naturalistic language in place of biblical idiom, starting with The Descent of Man in 1871.

Darwin's book caused less controversy than he had feared, as the idea of evolution had been widely popularized in Victorian Britain by the 1844 publication of Vestiges of Creation. However, it posed fundamental questions about the relationship between religion and science. Though Origin did not explicitly deal with human evolution, the jump was one both supporters and opponents of the theory immediately made, and the idea that man was simply an animal (common descent) who had evolved a particular set of characteristics — rather than a spiritual being created by God — continued to be one of the most divisive notions of the 19th century. One of the most famous disputes was the Oxford Debate of 1860, in which T.H. Huxley, Darwin's self-appointed "bulldog," debated evolution with Samuel Wilberforce, the Bishop of Oxford. Both sides claimed victory, then the controversy was overshadowed by the even greater theological furore over the publication of Essays and Reviews questioning whether miracles were atheistic, bringing to a head arguments in the Church of England between liberal theologians supporting higher criticism, and conservative Evangelicals. The essays were described by their opponents as heretical, and the essayists were called "The Seven Against Christ."

In 1862, the Glaswegian physicist William Thomson (later Lord Kelvin) published calculations, based on his presumption of uniformitarianism, and that the heat of the Sun was caused by its gravitational shrinkage, that fixed the age of the Earth and the Solar System at between 20 million and 400 million years, i.e. between ~3,000 and ~70,000 times Ussher's value. This came as a blow to Darwin's anticipated timescale, though the idea of an ancient Earth was generally accepted without much controversy. Darwin and Huxley, while not accepting the timing, said it merely implied faster evolution. It would take further advances in geology and the discovery of radioactivity that showed that the Sun was in fact heated by nuclear fusion that demonstrated the present estimated 4.567 billion years, or ~700,000 times Ussher's value. A way to measure the age of the universe would be discovered by Edwin Hubble in the 1930s, but due to observational constraints, an accurate measurement of the Hubble constant would not be forthcoming until the late 1990s. According to the ESA/Planck data, released in March 2013, the age of the universe is approximately 13.8 billion years or some ~2,000,000 times Ussher's value.

The Swiss-American paleontologist Louis Agassiz opposed evolution. He believed that there had been a series of catastrophes with divine re-creations, evidence of which could be seen in rock fossils. Though uniformitarianism dominated ideas from the 1840s onwards, Catastrophism remained a major paradigm in geology until replaced by new models that allowed for both cataclysms (such as meteor strikes) and gradualist patterns (such as ice ages) to explain observed geologic phenomena.

In 1878, American Presbyterians held the first annual Niagara Bible Conference, founding the Christian fundamentalist movement, which took its name from the "Five Fundamentals" of 1910, and came to be concerned about the implications of evolution for the accuracy of the Bible. But by no means all orthodox Presbyterians were opposed to evolution as a possible method of the Divine procedure. Dr Charles Hodge of Princeton Seminary objected in 1874 to the atheism he considered implied in the naturalistic explanation but both he and Dr B. B. Warfield were open to its possibility/probability within limits, and most churchmen sought to reconcile Darwinism with Christianity.

Darwin died in 1882. In 1915, Elizabeth Cotton, Lady Hope, spread rumors that he had repented and accepted God on his deathbed. Lady Hope's story is almost certainly false, and it is unlikely that she visited Darwin as she claimed.

== Early 20th century ==
In the 1920s, the term creationism became particularly associated with a Christian fundamentalist movement opposed to the idea of human evolution, which succeeded in getting teaching of evolution banned in United States public schools. From the mid-1960s young Earth creationism proposed "scientific creationism" using "Flood geology" as support for a literal reading of Genesis. After legal judgements that teaching this in public schools contravened constitutional separation of Church and State, it was stripped of biblical references and called creation science, then when this was ruled unacceptable, intelligent design was coined.

The decades before the start of the 20th century, and the first decades of that century, have been described as the eclipse of Darwinism. Darwin's work had quickly established scientific consensus that evolution occurred, but there was considerable disagreement about the mechanisms involved, and few gave as much significance to natural selection as Darwin himself. Evolution itself was assumed, but the mechanism of how it happened was in considerable debate, and none had anything near to a consensus. Among these theories were neo-Lamarckism (which merged certain aspects of Lamarck's theory of acquired characteristics with certain aspects of Darwinian evolution), orthogenesis ("straight-line" evolution, which talked about evolution towards a specific goal by forces within the organism), and the discontinuous variation of Mendelism and Hugo De Vries' mutation theory. Some of these alternative theories, in particular neo-Lamarckism and orthogenesis, allowed more easily for an interpretation of the intervention of God, which appealed to multiple scientists at the time. The term Darwinism had covered a range of ideas, some of which differed from Darwin's views, but it became associated with the minority view of August Weismann who went further than Darwin by rejecting inheritance of acquired characters and attributing all evolution to natural selection, a view also called neo-Darwinism. By the first decades of the 20th century, the debate had become generally one between continuous-variation biometricians and discontinuous-variety Mendelians. In the 1930s and 1940s, though, they were combined with natural selection into the modern evolutionary synthesis, which soon became the dominant model in the scientific community. This model has also been called Darwinism and neo-Darwinism.

George McCready Price was important in developing flood geology, and while he had limited influence at a time when all geologists had long accepted an ancient earth, a number of his ideas that a young earth could be deduced from science were taken up later. Price was a Seventh-day Adventist, and followed one of the founders of the church, Ellen White, in seeing fossils as evidence of the Great Flood. In 1906, Price published Illogical Geology: The Weakest Point in the Evolution Theory in which he offered $1000 "to any one who will, in the face of the facts here presented, show me how to prove that one kind of fossil is older than another."

=== United States ===
In 1910, the General Assembly of the Presbyterian Church distilled the principles of Christian fundamentalism into what were known as the "five fundamentals," one of which was the inerrancy of the Scriptures, including the Genesis account of creation. The Fundamentals were published as a series of essays. Its authors accepted ancient earth geology, while holding different ideas about how this was reconciled with biblical accounts. The views expressed on evolution were mixed: two short articles were anti evolution, one anonymous and one by the little-known Henry Beach. Their focus was on human evolution, as were attacks made on evolution by Dyson Hague. Major figures were explicitly open to the possibility that God created through a Lamarckian form of evolution: long articles by James Orr and George Frederick Wright expressed this openness, and Benjamin Breckinridge Warfield and A H Strong shared this view.

After the First World War (1914–1918), the teaching of creation and evolution in public education grew as a public controversy. By this time, multiple texts taught the theory of evolution as scientific fact. Multiple Christians in the US and later Jews and Muslims, expressed concern that in teaching evolution as fact, the State was unconstitutionally infringing on their right to the free exercise of religion, as in their opinion this taught their children that the Bible had been proven false.

For example, the Democratic Party politician William Jennings Bryan "became convinced that the teaching of Evolution as a fact caused the students to lose faith in the Bible, first, in the story of creation, and later in other doctrines, which underlie the Christian religion."

During the First World War, reports of horrors committed by Germans, who were citizens of one of the most scientifically advanced countries in the World, led Bryan to state "The same science that manufactured poisonous gases to suffocate soldiers is preaching that man has a brute ancestry and eliminating the miraculous and the supernatural from the Bible."

A popular book published in 1917 by Stanford University professor and entomologist Vernon L. Kellogg entitled Headquarters Nights, drew a direct association between German war ideology and Darwinian description of nature as a struggle. Kellogg was a leading authority on evolution of insects, and had published Darwinism Today in 1907. His anti-Darwinian and anti-German rhetoric in Headquarters Nights influenced biologists who tried to play down the negative implications of "survival of the fittest."

Benjamin Kidd's 1918 book Science of Power, claimed that there were historical and philosophical connections between Darwinism and German militarism. This book and others around this time had an effect on a number of people.

In 1922, William Jennings Bryan published In His Image, in which he argued that Darwinism was both irrational and immoral. On the former point, he pointed to examples such as the eye, which he argued could not be explained by Darwinian evolution. On the latter point, he argued that Darwinism advocated the policy of "scientific breeding" or eugenics, by which the strong were to weed out the weak, a policy that directly contradicts the Christian doctrine of charity to the helpless.

In 1923, fundamentalist preacher and evangelist William Bell Riley, known as "The Grand Old Man of Fundamentalism," founded the Anti-Evolution League of Minnesota, which, in 1924, became the Anti-Evolution League of America. The organization was behind anti-evolution legislation in Kentucky, where its efforts were supported by William Jennings Bryan.

In 1924, Clarence Darrow defended Nathan Leopold and Richard Loeb on the charge of kidnapping and killing Bobby Franks; his defense included an argument that "this terrible crime was inherent in his organism, and it came from some ancestor."

In the 1920s and 1930s, Harry Rimmer was one of the most prominent American creationists. Known as the "noisiest evangelist in America," he published multiple creationist tracts, debated other creationists and was involved in a famous trial known as the "Floyd-Rimmer trial" against the atheist William Floyd.

In 1925, G. K. Chesterton published The Everlasting Man, in which he developed and articulated multiple creationist ideas and criticisms of the philosophical underpinnings and perceived logical flaws of evolution.

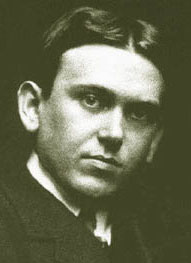
H. L. Mencken, whose nationally published coverage of the Scopes Trial referred to the town's creationist inhabitants as "yokels" and "morons", referred to assisting counsel for the prosecution as a "buffoon" and his speeches as "theologic bilge", while referring to the defense as "eloquent" and "magnificent"

The Scopes Trial of 1925 is perhaps the most famous court case of its kind. The Butler Act had prohibited the teaching of evolution in public schools in Tennessee. Clarence Darrow was the defense counsel, and William Jennings Bryan was the prosecutor. Bryan appealed for assistance to George McCready Price, Johns Hopkins University physician Howard A. Kelly, physicist Louis T. More, and Alfred W. McCann, all of whom had written books supporting creationism. Price was away in England, Kelly and More told Bryan they considered themselves more convinced by evolution, and McCann was not interested because of Bryan's stance on prohibition. Nevertheless, a schoolteacher named John T. Scopes was found guilty of teaching evolution and fined, although the case was later dismissed on a technicality.

Following up on the Butler Act, antievolutionary laws were passed in Mississippi in 1926, and then in Arkansas in 1928. However, the 1928 election and the onset of the Depression changed the playing field. Creationists shifted their attention from state legislatures to local school boards, having substantial success. They set themselves to the tasks of "the emasculation of textbooks, the 'purging' of libraries, and above all the, continued hounding of teachers." Discussions of evolution vanished from almost all schoolbooks. By 1941, about one third of American teachers were afraid of being accused of supporting evolution.

In 1929, a book by one of George McCready Price's former students, Harold W. Clark described Price's catastrophism as "creationism" in Back to Creationism. Previously anti-evolutionists had described themselves as being "Christian fundamentalists" "Anti-evolution" or "Anti-false science." The term creationism had previously referred to the creation of souls for each new person, as opposed to traducianism, where souls were said to have been inherited from one's parents.

In 1933, a group of atheists seeking to develop a "new religion" to replace previous, deity-based religions, composed the Humanist Manifesto, which outlined a fifteen-point belief system, the first two points of which provided that "Religious humanists regard the universe as self-existing and not created" and "Humanism believes that man is a part of nature and that he has emerged as a result of a continuous process." This document exacerbated the ideological tone of the discussion in multiple circles, as a number of creationists came to see evolution as a doctrine of the "religion" of atheism.

In 1935, the "Religion and Science Association" was formed by a small group of creationists, led by a Wheaton College professor, to form "a unified front against the theory of evolution." There were three main schools of creationist thought, represented by Price, Rimmer, and tidal expert William Bell Dawson. However, since Dawson was a proponent of day-age creationism and Rimmer was ardently convinced that gap creationism was correct, the staunch supporters of a literal 6 day creation and 6000-year-old Earth were incensed, and the organization fell apart.

Price and his supporters retreated to California, and with several doctors working at the College of Medical Evangelists (now Loma Linda University), formed the "Deluge Geology Society." The "Deluge Geology Society" published the Bulletin of Deluge Geology and Related Science from 1941 to 1945. They made secret plans to unveil discoveries of fossils of human footprints that were in rock that was purportedly older than accounted for in evolutionary theory. However, again the organization foundered over disagreements about a 6000-year-old Earth.

Price was particularly strident in his attacks against fellow creationists. His friend and former student Harold W. Clark had earned a master's degree in biology from the University of California, Berkeley, and felt that Price's book New Geology was "entirely out of date and inadequate." Unfortunately, Price responded angrily when he found out, accusing Clark of suffering from "the modern mental disease of universityitis" and of falling in with the "tobacco-smoking, Sabbath-breaking. God-defying" evolutionists. Clark pleaded with Price that he still believed in a 6 day creation and a young earth and a universal flood, but Price responded with a vitriolic publication entitled Theories of Satanic Origin about Clark and his views.

The American George Gaylord Simpson argued that the paleontological record supported evolution in the 1940s. Some creationists, however, objected to his supposed equation of microevolution and macroevolution, acknowledging the former but denying the latter, and continue to do so to this day.

== Post-war ==
=== United States ===
The Second World War (1939–1945) saw the horrors of the Nazi Holocaust. American creationist explanation for the Holocaust is that it had been driven in part by eugenics, or the principle that individuals with "undesirable" genetic characteristics should be removed from the gene pool. Eugenics was based in part on principles of cultural evolutionary theory, though multiple biologists had long opposed it. Although eugenics was rejected by other nations after the war, the memory of it did not quickly fade, and professional scientists sought to distance themselves from it and other racial ideologies associated with the Nazis.

Fissures within the creationist community, which had always been present, continued to deepen as fundamentalists received advanced training in the sciences. Geochemist J. Laurence Kulp had gone to the evangelical school Wheaton College for his undergraduate degree and was a Plymouth Brother. He obtained a PhD from Princeton before taking a faculty position at Columbia. He felt it was his duty to warn fellow Christians in the evangelical scientific organization the American Scientific Affiliation (ASA) of the problems with Price's claims. Kulp wrote a review of Price's work, in which he stated that "major propositions of the theory are contradicted by established physical and chemical laws" in 1950. This caused substantial consternation among his fellow members of the American Scientific Affiliation (ASA), an affiliation of Christians who are also scientists, causing some to claim that Kulp had been contaminated with "the orthodox geological viewpoint" and this was responsible for his faith in the Bible being badly shaken. Kulp's influence, however, continues today within the American Scientific Affiliation, which continues to support old Earth creationism.

In the 1950s the United States slid into a Cold War with the communist Soviet Union, its former ally. Communism had as one of its principles atheism. Americans divided over the issues of Communism and atheism, but with the Great Purge, Cultural Revolution and 1956 Hungarian Uprising, some became concerned about the implications of Communism and atheism. At the same time, the scientific community was making great strides in developing the theory of evolution, which seemed to make belief in God unreasonable under Occam's razor. The American shock and panic about the 1957 Sputnik launch led to the passage of the National Defense Education Act in 1958 to reform American science curricula. This resulted in the Biological Sciences Curriculum Study, also begun in 1958 and with the goal of writing new up-to-date biology textbooks. These new biology textbooks included a discussion of the theory of evolution. Within a few years, half of American schools were using the new BSCS biology textbooks. In addition, the hundredth anniversary of the publication of The Origin of Species was in 1959, and this sparked renewed public interest in evolutionary biology. The creationist fervor of the past seemed like ancient history. A historian at Oklahoma's Northeastern State University, R. Halliburton, even made a prediction in 1964 that "a renaissance of the [creationist] movement is most unlikely."

In 1961, Henry M. Morris and John C. Whitcomb, Jr published a book entitled The Genesis Flood, in an effort to provide a scientific basis for young Earth creationism and Flood geology. Morris had published several books previously, but none had the impact that The Genesis Flood did. Its publication resulted in ten like-minded creationists forming the Creation Research Society in 1963, and the Institute for Creation Research in 1972.

In 1968, the US Supreme Court ruled in Epperson vs. Arkansas that a 1928 act forbidding the teaching of human evolution violated the Establishment Clause of the US constitution. This clause lays out the Separation of church and state in the United States and states that "Congress shall make no law respecting an establishment of religion or restricting the free exercise thereof."

In 1970, creationists in California established the Institute for Creation Research, to "meet the need for an organization devoted to research, publication, and teaching in those fields of science particularly relevant to the study of origins."

In 1973, a famous anti-young Earth creationist essay by the evolutionary biologist Theodosius Dobzhansky was published in the American Biology Teacher entitled Nothing in Biology Makes Sense Except in the Light of Evolution. He argued that evolution was not incompatible with a belief in God nor a belief in the accuracy of scriptures.

In 1975, in Daniel v. Waters, the U.S. Sixth Circuit of Appeals struck down Tennessee's "equal time" law that any biology textbook which discussed human origins must give equal emphasis to the Biblical account.

In 1978 the International Council on Biblical Inerrancy developed the Chicago Statement on Biblical Inerrancy, which denies "that scientific hypotheses about earth history may properly be used to overturn the teaching of Scripture on creation and the flood."

In 1980, Walt Brown became director of the Center for Scientific Creation.

In 1981, the San Diego–based fundamentalist group the Creation Science Research Center claimed, in a trial dubbed the "Monkey Trial Replay," that teaching evolution as the sole theory of development violated the rights of children who believed in biblical creation. In his opening statement for the group lawyer Richard Turner argued:

It is not a showdown at high noon between creation and evolution. It is not religion versus science. We are not trying to sneak the Bible into the classroom, or any other religious doctrine. The real issue here is that of religious freedom under the United States Constitution.

Turner went on to explain that the plaintiffs were seeking protection for the belief that "God created man as man, not as a blob." The Times of 7 March 1981 reported that some were of the opinion that the case was "a signal of things to come, with more and more fundamentalist groups trying to flex their not inconsiderable influence in schools across the country." At the same time Frank D. White, the Governor of Arkansas signed a Bill requiring that creation science and the theory of evolution be given equal weight in schools. Although fifteen states attempted to introduce such Bills around this time, only that in Arkansas made it into law. Following hearings in Little Rock the law was overturned by Judge William Overton early in 1982, just as a similar (and equally unsuccessful) Bills were approved by legislators in Mississippi and Louisiana.

Carl Baugh established the Creation Evidence Museum in Glen Rose, Texas, in 1984. Kent Hovind's Young Earth Creationist ministry was founded in 1989.

In 1986, another creationist organization called "Reasons to Believe" was established. Unlike most current creationist organizations, RTB supports Old Earth creationism.

In 1987, the US Supreme Court again ruled, this time in Edwards v. Aguillard, that requiring the teaching of "creation science" every time evolution was taught illegally advanced a particular religion, although a variety of views on origins could be taught in public schools if shown to have a basis in science. The court gave a clear definition of science, and further ruled that so-called "creation science" was simply creationism wrongly using a contrived dualism to assert that any evidence against evolution would prove Creation. Later that year, drafts of the creation science school textbook Of Pandas and People were revised to change all references to "creation" to relate to "intelligent design."

In 1989, the Foundation for Thought and Ethics published Of Pandas and People by Percival Davis and Dean H. Kenyon, editor Charles Thaxton, with the definition that "Intelligent design means that various forms of life began abruptly through an intelligent agency, with their distinctive features already intact. Fish with fins and scales, birds with feathers, beaks, wings, etc." The publisher got church groups and Christian radio to campaign for state textbook approval, with a petition in Alabama urging that "Intelligent Design" be presented as an alternative to evolution, and their attorney arguing that it did not compel belief in the supernatural and was not a creationist text. After setbacks it focussed efforts "outside the schools" to prompt grass-roots activity from local school boards, teacher's groups and parents.

In 1990, law professor Phillip E. Johnson set out his argument that the ground rules of science as presented at Edwards v. Aguillard unfairly disqualified creationist explanations by excluding the supernatural, and in 1991, he brought out a book entitled Darwin on Trial, challenging the principles of naturalism and uniformitarianism in contemporary scientific philosophy.

In March 1992, a symposium at Southern Methodist University in Dallas provided the public debut for a small group that included Phillip Johnson, Stephen C. Meyer, William Dembski, and Michael Behe, initiating the wedge strategy that Johnson claims to have worked out by 1991.

The 1993 second edition of the school textbook Of Pandas and People added a section by Michael Behe making the argument he later called irreducible complexity.

The 1990s saw the rise of intelligent design, which maintains that intelligent intervention was necessary for evolution and in other ways seeks to create doubt about the validity and feasibility of evolution, and to change the scientific method so that supernatural explanations are accepted.

In 1994, the court case Peloza v. Capistrano School District was decided against a teacher who claimed that his First Amendment right to free exercise of religion was violated by the school district's requirement to teach evolution.

In 1996, the Discovery Institute's Center for Science and Culture (CSC), formerly known as the Center for Renewal of Science and Culture, was founded to promote Intelligent design, and entered public discourse with the publication of Darwin's Black Box by Michael Behe, arguing for evidence of Irreducible complexity. Critics claimed that this was a thinly veiled attempt to promote creationism, particularly in light of Edwards v. Aguillard. The Discovery Institute rejects the term creationism, which it defines narrowly as meaning young Earth creationism, though in court intelligent design was found to be creationism.

In October 1999 the Michael Polanyi Center was founded in the science faculty of Baylor University, a Baptist college, to study intelligent design. A year later was disbanded amidst faculty complaints that the center had been established without consulting them, and would cause the school to be associated with pseudoscience.

In December 2001, the United States Congress passed the No Child Left Behind Act, which contained the following statement of policy, called the Santorum Amendment, authored by Johnson:

"The Conferees recognize that a quality scientific education should prepare students to distinguish the data and testable theories of science from religious or philosophical claims that are made in the name of science. Where topics are taught that may generate controversy (such as biological evolution), the curriculum should help students to understand the full range of scientific views that exist, why such topics may generate controversy, and how scientific discoveries can profoundly affect society."

In December 2001, Dembski established the International Society for Complexity, Information and Design.

Answers In Creation was established in 2003 to provide answers to young Earth creation organizations. They claim that the young Earth position is unscientific, and through their website they claim to provide proof against young Earth creation science. They are anti-young Earth, and promote Christianity by endorsing old Earth creationism.

In 2004 Ohio adopted education standards sympathetic to intelligent design promoted by the Discovery Institute. In February 2006 the Ohio Board of Education voted to drop the Discovery Institute's "Critical Analysis of Evolution" intelligent design lesson plan after the 2005 ruling against intelligent design in Kitzmiller v. Dover and revelations that the lesson plan was adopted despite warnings from the Ohio Department of Education, whose experts described it as wrong and misleading.

In May 2005, the Kansas school board held the Kansas evolution hearings. The court-style hearings were promoted by the Discovery Institute and attended by its Fellows and other intelligent design advocates but not by mainstream scientists, who accused it of being a kangaroo court. The result of the hearings was the adoption by the Republican-dominated board of new science standards that relied upon the Discovery Institute's Critical Analysis of Evolution lesson plan employing the institute's Teach the Controversy approach, despite these having been rejected by the State Board Science Hearing Committee. With the 2006 ouster of the majority of the conservative board members, the Kansas State Board of Education approved a new curriculum that removed any reference to Intelligent Design as part of science in February 2007.

In 2005, the U.S. District Court for the Middle District of Pennsylvania ruled on the case of Kitzmiller v. Dover Area School District that intelligent design was religious in nature, a form of creationism, not scientific and thus violated the First Amendment to the United States Constitution. The ruling barred the teaching of intelligent design in public school science classrooms for that district, but the 'Dover trial' as it came to be known, has had far-reaching effects. Around the same time as the Kiztmiller ruling, multiple state legislators were considering bills promoted by the Discovery Institute supporting the teaching of intelligent design. Most were rejected in the light of the ruling in Dover trial out of what has been called the "Dover-effect."

In September 2012, Bill Nye ("The Science Guy") warned that creationist views threaten science education and innovations in the United States. (Bill Nye video)

== See also ==
- Abiogenesis
- Big Bang
- Geological time scale
- Evolution
- Extraterrestrial life
- Multiverse
- Solar nebular theory
