= Stever =

Stever may refer to:

== Places ==
- Stever (river), a tributary of the Lippe in Germany
- Stever Ridge, ridge in Victoria Land in Antarctica

== People ==
- Guyford Stever (1916–2010), American administrator, physicist, educator, and engineer
- Isabelle Stever (born 1963), German film director
- Johann Stever (1889–c.1945), German officer during World War II
- Margo Taft Stever, American poet
- Michael Stever, American film director, cinematographer, producer, writer, and actor
- Travis Stever (born 1978), lead guitarist for American rock band Coheed and Cambria

== Other ==
- Willoughby v. Stever, American legal case
