= Harold W. Clark =

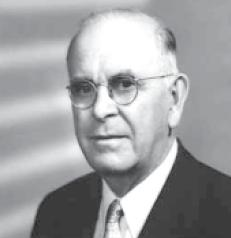
Harold W. Clark

Harold Willard Clark (1891 – 12 May 1986) was a prominent creationist in the middle of the twentieth century.

== Biography ==
Clark was born in 1891 and raised as a Seventh-day Adventist on a farm in New England. His interest in science and religion was first evoked by George McCready Price's Back to the Bible (1916). After years of church-school teaching, he enrolled at Pacific Union College in 1920, where he studied under (the newly arrived) Price. He graduated two years later and replaced Price (who had accepted a position at Union College, Nebraska) on the faculty. In 1929, he had dedicated his work Back to Creationism to Price. Historian Ronald L. Numbers credits this book with the introduction of the name "Creationism" to the movement, which had previously been known as "Anti-Evolution".

That summer, and a number of vacations thereafter, he spent studying glaciation, coming (in the 1930s) to the conclusion that large proportions of North America had been covered in ice for as long as one and a half millennia after the flood — a view that was anathema to Price. In 1932 he earned an MA in biology from the University of California, and on his return updated and enlarged his book, introducing his views on glaciation, and rejecting the common Adventist view, associated with Price, that species were fixed, in favour of one that allowed considerable hybridization. The revised book drew effusive praise from Price.

In 1938, Clark visited the oil fields of Oklahoma and Northern Texas, where his observation of deep drilling confirmed long-standing suspicions that there existed a meaningful geological column, a position adamantly denied by Price. Clark attributed this column to antediluvian ecologies ranging from ocean depths to mountaintops, rather than the successive layers through deep time of mainstream geology. Despite continuing to point out that he still believed in six-day creation, Clark was pelted with criticisms from Price, who accused Clark of having contracted "the modern mental disease of universityitis" and curried favor with "tobacco-smoking, Sabbath-breaking, God-defying" evolutionists. This led Price to vitriolically and implacably break with Clark, who Price would continue to criticize strongly in his 1947 pamphlet Theories of Satanic Origin.

Clark died in St. Helena Hospital on 12 May 1986, aged 94.

== Publications ==
- Back to Creationism, 1929
- Genes and Genesis, 1940
- The New Diluvialism, 1946
- Creation Speaks: A Study of the Scientific Aspects of the Genesis Record of Creation and the Flood., 1949 (2017 Reprint, CrossReach Publications)
- Crusader for Creation: The Life and Works of George McCready Price, 1966
- Fossils, Flood and Fire. Outdoor Pictures. 1968. ISBN 0-911080-16-3.
- The Battle Over Genesis
- New creationism. Nashville: Southern Pub. Association. 1980. ISBN 0-8127-0247-6.

== See also ==
- Creation science
- History of creationism
