= Willoughby v. Stever =

- Court: United States Court of Appeals for the District of Columbia Circuit
- Full case name: William Willoughby v. National Science Foundation director H. Guyford Stever, Board of Regents of the University of Colorado
- Decided: October 10 1974
- Citations: Civ. A. No. 1574-72 (D.D.C.)aff'd mem., 504 F.2d 271 (D.C. Cir. 1974), cert. denied, 420 U.S. 927 (1975);

Holding
- Public funding of evolution education in textbooks support science, not religious, teachings;states may not require teaching be tailored to satisfy religious beliefs; affirmed

Case opinions
- Per curiam

Laws applied
- First Amendment

Willoughby v. Stever, 504 F.2d 271 (D. C. Cir. 1974) was an American legal decision in a case brought by evangelist William Willoughby against the National Science Foundation director H. Guyford Stever and the Board of Regents of the University of Colorado for using taxpayer money to fund textbooks developed by the Biological Sciences Curriculum Study (BSCS) because they included evolution instruction. Willoughby claimed the pro-evolution curriculum was by extension also promoting secular humanism as the "official religion of the United States," and thus violated the Establishment Clause of the US Constitution. Willoughby accused scientists of "intellectual snobbery", and opposed tax revenues going to support education offensive to his religious views. He argued that creationist education should be given the same tax payer funding as evolution education.

The lawsuit was dismissed by the United States District Court for the District of Columbia on the grounds that the textbooks disseminated science, not religion. The Court also held that the Constitution's First Amendment prohibited states from demanding textbook teachings align with the religious beliefs of any particular group or individual.

The District Court ruling was upheld by the United States Court of Appeals District of Columbia Circuit on October 23, 1974. The United States Supreme Court later refused to hear the case.
