= Walt Brown (creationist) =

American young earth creationist (1937–2025)

- Born: August 18, 1937
- Died: September 27, 2025 (aged 88)
- Education: United States Military Academy (BS); Massachusetts Institute of Technology (PhD)
- Known for: Advocacy of Young Earth creationism
- Scientific career
- Fields: Mechanical engineering
- Thesis: A study of flow surface boiling (1967)
- Website: https://www.creationscience.com/

Walter Tarleton Brown Jr. (August 18, 1937 – September 27, 2025) was an American engineer, author, and young Earth creationist who was the director of his own ministry called the Center for Scientific Creation. The Skeptic's Dictionary considered him to be one of the leaders of the creation science movement. He proposed a specific version of flood geology called the Hydroplate Theory.

== Biography ==
Brown attended the United States Military Academy, where he received a Bachelor of Science, then earned a Ph.D. in mechanical engineering from the Massachusetts Institute of Technology in 1967. He served as an officer in the United States military until he retired in 1980.

After retiring from the military, Brown was the director of his "Center for Scientific Creation" and did his own research, writing, and speaking on origins theory. In 1998, Brown was appointed to a committee reviewing Arizona's state science standards. Evolution was retained in the Arizona state science standards after a final decision in August 1998.

Brown died on 27 September 2025, at the age of 88.

== Creationist ==
In Brown's In the Beginning: Compelling Evidence for Creation and the Flood he suggested evidence exists against evolution and for creation science and flood geology (including hydroplates). It is divided into three sections, the first of which explores discoveries made by scientists that do not fit the theory of evolution. The second section outlines various alternate explanations to geological and astronomical subjects such as the mid-oceanic ridge and comets, which Brown stated evolutionary science cannot explain. The final section presents a variety of other questions encountered in the creation–evolution controversy.

In 1989, the Creation/Evolution journal of the National Center for Science Education published a critique of Brown's theory. Jim Lippard, graduate student of philosophy begins with a criticism focusing primarily on fossil evidence of human evolution. Brown addressed several of Lippard's points in his response, and three further articles were printed: Lippard, Brown, and ending with Lippard, where he asserts that Brown made serious errors, including using "mistaken claims about what others have written." The series of articles does not discuss Brown's hydroplates, apart from Brown's claim that Lippard "dismisses or ignores the bulk of the book and specifically addresses only a very small fraction of its substance."

Robert T. Pennock has described Brown's position as being typical, other than the unique feature of his hydroplates hypothesis, of young-earth creationist's explaining all major terrestrial features in terms of a catastrophic Biblical flood.

=== Hydroplate theory ===
The most distinctive feature of Brown's theories, compared to other creationist theories, are the hydroplates. He claimed that, prior to the Flood of Noah, there was an enormous amount of water underneath the crust of the Earth, and that this water pressurizing, shattering the crust, and breaking it into plates was both part of the Flood and created the continental plates that mainstream geology associates with plate tectonics. Because the plates are, in this theory, formed by the action of water, he called them "hydroplates" and gave their name to the theory.

== Reception ==
Walt Brown had contentious relations with other creationist organizations. The young earth creationist organization Answers in Genesis had a standing offer to Brown to publish some of his material in their journals but Brown declined. The old earth creationist organization Answers in Creation has published material rebutting Brown's hydroplate theory. The Christian American Scientific Affiliation website features a video critical of Brown's video "God's Power and Scripture's Authority" by Steven H. Schimmrich of Kutztown University of Pennsylvania.

Brown stated that no "evolutionist" will publicly debate with him, but was accused by opponents of complicating such debates. An abortive attempt at such a debate was held in 1989 and 1990 in the pages of Creation/Evolution, the National Center for Science Education journal, before Brown refused to continue. Joe Meert of Gondwana Research, a journal promoting research related to the origin and evolution of continents, alleges he "signed a contract" for such a debate with Brown in 2000. He says Brown disputed the terms of the contract and it did not take place. Brown stated on his website that the actual reason for the debate not taking place was that the Meert wanted to add religion and since Dr. Brown is not a theologian, he wanted the debate to be strictly science. According to Georgia State University biology professor Fred K. Parrish, who afterwards said he was "tricked" into an April 1985 public debate with Brown, says Brown had a set of preconditions (such as Brown speaking first, the debate moderator sitting on his side, and all debate material being scientific, not religious in nature).

== Bibliography ==
- In the Beginning: Compelling Evidence for Creation and the Flood, Center for Scientific Creation (8th edn ISBN 1-878026-09-7).
