= Daniel v. Waters =

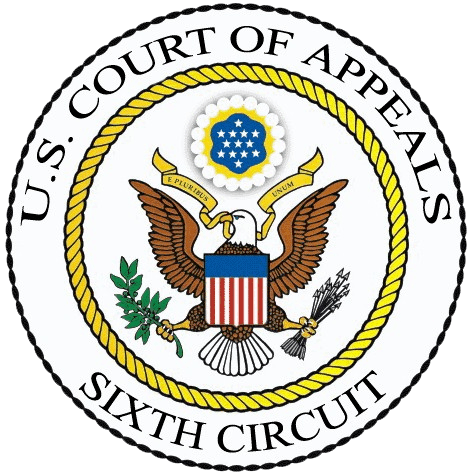
- Court: United States Court of Appeals for the Sixth Circuit
- Full case name: Joseph C. Daniel, Jr., et al., v. Hugh Waters, Chairman, Textbook Commission of the State of Tennessee, et al.
- Decided: April 10, 1975
- Citation: 515 F.2d 485 (6th Cir. 1975)

Case history
- Prior history: District Court entered order abstaining from a decision on the merits, February 26, 1974.
- Subsequent history: On remand, 399 F. Supp. 510 (M.D. Tenn. 1975)

Court membership
- Judges sitting: George Clifton Edwards, Jr., Anthony J. Celebrezze, Pierce Lively

Case opinions
- Majority: Edwards, joined by Lively
- Dissent: Celebrezze

Laws applied
- U.S. Const. amend. I

Daniel v. Waters, 515 F.2d 485 (6th Cir. 1975) was a 1975 legal case in which the United States Court of Appeals for the Sixth Circuit struck down Tennessee's law regarding the teaching of "equal time" of evolution and creationism in public school science classes because it violated the Establishment Clause of the US Constitution.

The plaintiffs were school teachers supported by the National Association of Biology Teachers.

== Background ==
Various state laws prohibiting the teaching of evolution had been introduced during the 1920s. These laws were challenged in 1968 in the case Epperson v. Arkansas, which established that such laws were to be held in violation of the constitutional separation of Church and State. The creationist movement reacted to the decision by turning to the promotion of the teaching of creationism in school science classes as equal to evolutionary theory.

== The act ==
The Tennessee law stated that, from the beginning of the school year of 1975-76;

"Any biology textbook used for teaching in the public schools, which expresses an opinion of, or relates a theory about origins or creation of man and his world shall be prohibited from being used as a textbook in such system unless it specifically states that it is a theory as to the origin and creation of man and his world and is not represented to be scientific fact. Any textbook so used in the public education system which expresses an opinion or relates to a theory or theories shall give in the same text-book and under the same subject commensurate attention to, and an equal amount of emphasis on, the origins and creation of man and his world as the same is recorded in other theories, including, but not limited to, the Genesis account in the Bible."

The law defined the Bible as a "reference work", which did not have to carry the disclaimer "that it is a theory ...and is not represented to be scientific fact" required in textbooks.

== The ruling ==
The Federal District Court ruling was that the Tennessee law was "a clearly defined preferential position for the Biblical version of creation as opposed to any account of the development of man based on scientific research and reasoning. For a state to seek to enforce such preference by law is to seek to accomplish the very establishment of religion which the First Amendment to the Constitution of the United States squarely forbids."

== Effect of the ruling ==
The ruling did not prevent the Bible from being taught in public schools in an appropriate way. The Court stated (quoting from a prior decision): "While study of religions and of the Bible from a literary and historic viewpoint, presented objectively as part of a secular program of education, need not collide with the First Amendment's prohibition, the State may not adopt programs or practices in its public schools or colleges which "aid or oppose" any religion."

Following this ruling, several states then passed new legislation which required that creation science be given equal time with teaching of evolution. This came to court as McLean v. Arkansas (1982), which resulted in a detailed ruling that it was similarly unconstitutional to teach this in public school science classes. This was a District level ruling and, while setting a persuasive precedent, it was only a binding precedent in the relevant district. It was not until Edwards v. Aguillard (1987), a similar case in Louisiana, was appealed to the U.S. Supreme Court that creation science was ruled unconstitutional at the federal level, which resulted in its removal from public school science classes nationwide. The reaction from the creationist forces would be to create the new concept of intelligent design specifically in order to circumvent this ruling.
