= BSCS Science Learning =

Educational curriculum development center

BSCS Science Learning, formerly known as Biological Sciences Curriculum Study (BSCS), is an educational center that develops curricular materials, provides educational support, and conducts research and evaluation in the fields of science and technology. It was formed in 1958, and became an independent non-profit organization in 1973, headquartered in Colorado Springs, Colorado. In 2018, BSCS changed its name to BSCS Science Learning.

== History ==
Soon after receiving a National Science Foundation grant in 1958, the American Institute of Biological Sciences established the base for BSCS activities at the University of Colorado at Boulder. Arnold Grobman, a herpetologist, served as the first director of BSCS, from 1958 until 1965. Hiram Bentley Glass, a geneticist, chaired the first Steering Committee (later the Board) from 1959 until 1965. The BSCS leadership during its first decade of operation was mainly made up of professional biologists. These professional biologists worked with high school educators and administrators to develop and implement new curriculum materials.

During the first Steering Committee meetings in 1959, the BSCS decided to target high school biology, mainly at the tenth-grade level, for improvement. In the summer of 1960, the BSCS convened an intensive summer writing conference in Boulder, at which three new high school biology textbooks were developed. The three versions were: Blue, a molecular biology approach; Green, an ecology approach; and Yellow, a cellular biology approach. These three versions, and their corresponding newly developed laboratory exercises, were piloted at high schools around the United States during the 1960–61 school year. The curriculum materials were then revised during the summer of 1961 based on feedback from teachers, students, and professional biologists, and tested again during 1961–62. In 1963, the three textbook versions were published commercially.

All three BSCS curriculum versions stressed key biological themes, such as science as inquiry, the complementarity of structure and function, genetic continuity and evolution. The BSCS textbooks emphasized evolution as a major scientific theory at a time when it was largely omitted from existing high school curricula, and the BSCS organization has remained committed to the teaching of evolution since its inception.

The BSCS also expanded its work beyond standard tenth-grade biology curriculum to produce educational materials for exceptional students, for teachers, and for all educational levels, from kindergarten to adult.

In 2018, BSCS celebrated its 60th anniversary and officially changed its name to BSCS Science Learning.

== Products ==
In 2022, BSCS released a new high school biology program, BSCS Biology: Understanding for Life, which includes a new instructional model called Anchored Inquiry Learning.

== Evolution controversy ==
During the Cold War, in 1957, the Soviet Union successfully launched the first Earth orbiting artificial satellite, Sputnik I. The event triggered alarm in United States by heightening fears there that the Soviet Union was achieving technological and strategic superiority. One response to what the Americans termed the Sputnik crisis was to invest money and expertise towards a re-invigoration of the country's science and technological educational system. It was during this period that the BSCS was engaged to develop updated high school biology textbooks. The biology texts they developed covered evolutionary theory, which was by this time overwhelmingly accepted as biology's central organizing principle.

These books became widely used in the nation's high schools, and as a consequence, the public controversy about the teaching of evolution in public schools re-ignited. After a 1968 Supreme Court decision nullified decades-old laws prohibiting the teaching of evolution in many places of the country, some evolution opponents turned their efforts against the public funding of evolutionary teaching, including publicly funded textbooks. The BSCS textbooks were featured in the 1973 case Willoughby v. Stever, a suit filed by an evangelical opponent of evolution who attempted, and failed, to have the evolution instruction in the textbook legally recognized as an unconstitutional establishment of religious secularism. The case was dismissed as meritless, and was cited as legal precedent in other groundbreaking decisions in the American cultural battle over evolution in the schools.
