= Epperson v. Arkansas =

- Supreme Court of the United States

Argued October 16, 1968 Decided November 12, 1968
- Full case name: Susan Epperson, et al. v. Arkansas
- Citations: 393 U.S. 97 (more) 89 S. Ct. 266; 21 L. Ed. 2d 228; 1968 U.S. LEXIS 328

Case history
- Prior: Appeal from the Supreme Court of Arkansas
- Subsequent: None

Holding
- States may not require curricula to align with the views of any particular religion.

Court membership
- Chief Justice Earl Warren Associate Justices Hugo Black · William O. Douglas; John M. Harlan II · William J. Brennan Jr. Potter Stewart · Byron White; Abe Fortas · Thurgood Marshall

Case opinions
- Majority: Fortas, joined by Warren, Douglas, Brennan, White, Marshall
- Concurrence: Black
- Concurrence: Harlan
- Concurrence: Stewart

Laws applied
- U.S. Const. amend. I, amend. XIV

Epperson v. Arkansas, 393 U.S. 97 (1968), is a unanimous landmark United States Supreme Court case that invalidated an Arkansas statute prohibiting the teaching of human evolution in the public schools. The Court held that the First Amendment to the United States Constitution prohibits a state from requiring, in the words of the majority opinion, "that teaching and learning must be tailored to the principles or prohibitions of any religious sect or dogma." The Supreme Court declared the Arkansas statute unconstitutional because it violated the Establishment Clause of the First Amendment. After this decision, some jurisdictions passed laws that required the teaching of creation science alongside evolution when evolution was taught. The Court also ruled these laws were unconstitutional in the 1987 case, Edwards v. Aguillard.

== Background ==
Epperson focused on the constitutionality of a 1928 Arkansas statute prohibiting the teaching of human evolutionary theory in its public schools and universities. The statute was enacted during a period of Christian Fundamentalist religious fervor in the 1920s. The Arkansas statute was modeled after Tennessee's 1925 "Butler Act", the subject of the well known Scopes Trial in 1925. The Tennessee Supreme Court upheld the constitutionality of the Tennessee law in 1927, allowing the state to continue to prohibit the teaching of evolution.

The Arkansas law was passed through the initiative process, the first anti-evolution law in the United States passed through general election, and teachers who violated it were made subject to fine and dismissal by the state. The law made it unlawful for any teacher or other instructor in any university, college, public school or other institution of the state which is supported in whole or in part from public funds derived by state or local taxation to teach the theory or doctrine that mankind ascended or descended from a lower order of animals, and also that it be unlawful for any teacher, textbook commission, or other authority exercising the power to select textbooks for above-mentioned institutions to adopt or use in any such institution a textbook that teaches the doctrine or theory that mankind ascended or descended from a lower order of animal.

Thirty years later, Cold War concerns over Soviet success with the 1957 Sputnik launch led to the 1958 National Defense Education Act and Biological Sciences Curriculum Study setting textbook standards which included evolution. Epperson v. Arkansas involved the teaching of biology in a Little Rock high school. Based upon the recommendation of the school biology teachers, administrators adopted the 1965 textbook Modern Biology for the 1965–1966 school year, which contained a chapter discussing Charles Darwin and evolutionary theory, and prescribed the subject be taught to the students.

Susan Epperson was a teacher in the Little Rock school system, employed to teach 10th grade biology at the Little Rock Central High School. The adoption of the new textbook and curriculum standard put her in a legal dilemma because it remained a criminal offense to teach the material in her state, and to do as her school district instructed would also put her at risk of dismissal. Epperson was not opposed to the teaching, and with backing from the Arkansas chapter of the National Education Association and the American Civil Liberties Union, and the unequivocal support of the Little Rock Ministerial Association, filed suit to test the federal constitutionality of the Arkansas state law. She filed in the Chancery Court in Pulaski County seeking nullification of the law and an injunction against her being dismissed for teaching the evolutionary curriculum. She was joined in the suit by H. H. Blanchard, a parent with children in the school.

The trial began on April 1, 1966, and the court issued its decision on May 27, 1966. The Chancery Court held that the statute violated the Fourteenth Amendment to the United States Constitution which protects citizens from state interference with freedom of speech and thought as contained in the First Amendment. The lower court decided the law was unconstitutional because it "tends to hinder the quest for knowledge, restrict the freedom to learn, and restrain the freedom to teach."

The state appealed the decision to the Arkansas Supreme Court, which reversed the lower court ruling on June 5, 1967. The opinion read:

Upon the principal issue, that of constitutionality, the court holds that Initiated Measure No. 1 of 1928, Ark.Stat.Ann. § 81627 and § 81628 (Repl.1960), is a valid exercise of the state's power to specify the curriculum in its public schools. The court expresses no opinion on the question whether the Act prohibits any explanation of the theory of evolution or merely prohibits teaching that the theory is true, the answer not being necessary to a decision in the case and the issue not having been raised.

This decision left the ban against teaching evolution in effect.

== U.S. Supreme Court Decision ==
Epperson appealed the State Supreme Court's reversal to the United States Supreme Court. Eugene R. Warren presented arguments for the appellant, Epperson, and Don Langston, an Assistant Attorney General for Arkansas, argued for the state of Arkansas. Both Langston and the State Appeal Court focused on the power given to states to set curriculum standards, and did not delve far into the subject of evolutionary theory itself nor to the boundaries between church and state. The U.S. Supreme Court hearing commenced on October 16, 1968, and the Court announced its unanimous decision on November 12, 1968. It found the reasons given in the Arkansas reversal were in error. The Court went on to say that the clear purpose of the Arkansas statute against the teaching of evolution was to protect a particular religious view, and was thus unconstitutional. In a decision written by Justice Abe Fortas, the Court held that:

The overriding fact is that Arkansas’ law selects from the body of knowledge a particular segment which it proscribes for the sole reason that it is deemed to conflict with a particular religious doctrine; that is, with a particular interpretation of the Book of Genesis by a particular religious group.

The Court found that not only was the state prohibited from advancing or protecting a particular religious view, but that

[T]he state has no legitimate interest in protecting any or all religions from views distasteful to them.

Justice Hugo Black issued a separate opinion to overturn the Arkansas law, finding the law unconstitutionally "vague" rather than an unconstitutional religious infringement. While agreeing with the majority to reverse the State Appeal Court decision, his opinion details his dissent from the majority over the First Amendment issue.

== Consequences ==
Though William Jennings Bryan famously testified to some questions about Biblical creation in the 1925 Scopes v. State trial, that Court, like this one, was asked only to judge whether teachings about human evolution could be prohibited in the public schools. Bryan, who opposed the evolution instruction, never argued that the teaching of Biblical creation belonged in the school.

The precedent set in Epperson, in which the Court concluded the sole motive behind the ban against evolution teaching in Arkansas was to protect a particular religious view, effectively nullified all other related evolution education prohibitions throughout the United States. Within a short time of the Epperson decision, religious opponents of the teaching attempted through other means to lessen its influence in the curriculum, including requiring schools to teach biblical creation alongside evolution or forcing schools to provide disclaimers that evolution was "only a theory". These attempts eventually resulted in precedent-setting court decisions including McLean v. Arkansas, and ultimately Edwards v. Aguillard, which struck down a Louisiana statute as unconstitutional.

== Related cases ==
- Joseph Burstyn, Inc v. Wilson—1952
- Engel v. Vitale—1962
- Abington School District v. Schempp—1963

== See also ==
- List of United States Supreme Court cases, volume 393
